= List of Chengdu Metro stations =

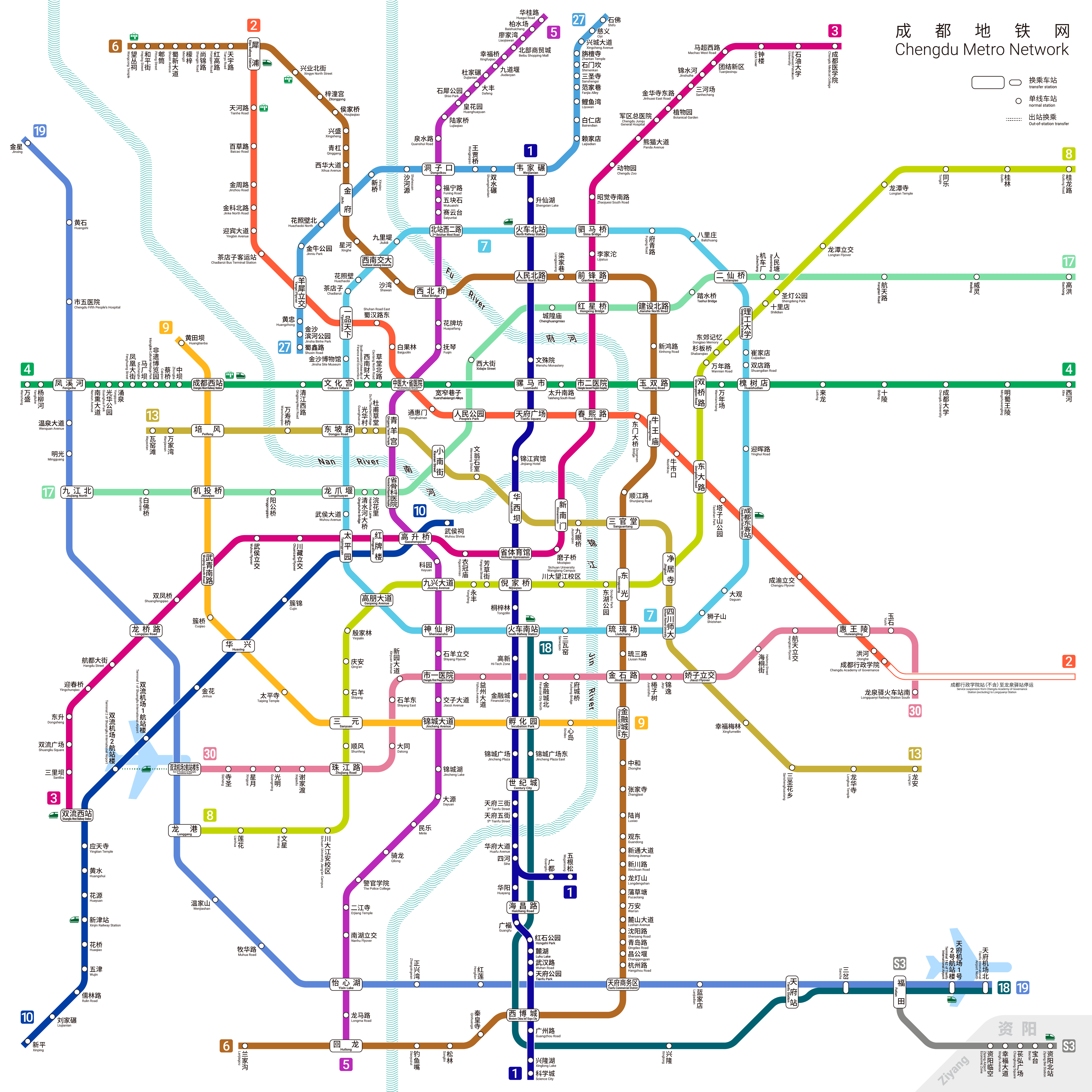
Map of the Chengdu Metro

The following is a list of stations found within the Chengdu Metro.

OSI: Out-of-Station Interchange

== Line 1 ==
Service routes		Station name		Connections	Distance km		Location
Service routes		English	Chinese	Connections	Distance km		Location
●	●	Weijianian	韦家碾	27	-	0	Jinniu
●	●	Shengxian Lake	升仙湖		1.514	1.514	Chenghua
●	●	North Railway Station	火车北站	7 CG CDW Chengdu BRT	1.593	3.107	Jinniu
●	●	Renmin North Road	人民北路	6	1.180	4.287	Jinniu
●	●	Wenshu Monastery	文殊院		1.351	5.638	Qingyang
●	●	Luomashi	骡马市	4	0.884	6.522	Qingyang
●	●	Tianfu Square	天府广场	2	1.018	7.54	Qingyang
●	●	Jinjiang Hotel	锦江宾馆		0.833	8.373	Jinjiang
●	●	Huaxiba	华西坝		0.779	9.152	Wuhou
●	●	Sichuan Gymnasium	省体育馆	3	1.058	10.21	Wuhou
●	●	Nijiaqiao	倪家桥	8	0.961	11.171	Wuhou
●	●	Tongzilin	桐梓林		1.052	12.223	Wuhou
●	●	South Railway Station	火车南站	7 18 CNW	1.113	13.336	Wuhou
●	●	Hi-Tech Zone	高新		1.307	14.643	Wuhou
●	●	Financial City	金融城		1.296	15.939	Wuhou
●	●	Incubation Park	孵化园	9 18	0.826	16.765	Wuhou
●	●	Jincheng Plaza	锦城广场	18	0.85	17.615	Wuhou
●	●	Century City	世纪城	18	1.452	19.067	Wuhou
●	●	3rd Tianfu Street	天府三街		0.965	20.032	Wuhou
●	●	5th Tianfu Street	天府五街		1.011	21.043	Wuhou
●	●	Huafu Avenue	华府大道		1.261	22.304	Shuangliu
●	●	Sihe	四河		1.099	23.403	Shuangliu
●	｜	Huayang	华阳		1.413	24.816	Shuangliu
●	｜	Haichang Road	海昌路	18	1.178	25.994	Shuangliu
●	｜	Guangfu	广福		1.565	27.559	Shuangliu
●	｜	Hongshi Park	红石公园		1.611	29.17	Shuangliu
●	｜	Luhu Lake	麓湖		1.09	30.26	Shuangliu
●	｜	Wuhan Road	武汉路		1.347	31.607	Shuangliu
●	｜	Tianfu Park	天府公园		1.169	32.776	Shuangliu
●	｜	Western China Int'l Expo City	西博城	6 18	0.915	33.691	Shuangliu
●	｜	Guangzhou Road	广州路		0.696	34.387	Shuangliu
●	｜	Xinglong Lake	兴隆湖		1.475	35.862	Shuangliu
●	｜	Science City	科学城		1.612	37.474	Shuangliu
	●	Guangdu	广都		1.033	38.50	Shuangliu
	●	Wugensong	五根松		1.396	39.90	Shuangliu

== Line 2 ==
Service routes		Station name		Connections	Distance km		Location
Service routes		English	Chinese	Connections	Distance km		Location
●	●	Xipu Railway Station	犀浦	6 CG	0.00	0.00	Pidu
●	●	Tianhe Road	天河路	T2	1.85	1.85	Pidu
●	●	Baicao Road	百草路		1.65	3.50	Pidu
●	●	Jinzhou Road	金周路		2.20	5.70	Jinniu
●	●	Jinke North Road	金科北路		1.15	6.85	Jinniu
●	●	Yingbin Avenue	迎宾大道		1.05	7.90	Jinniu
●	●	Chadianzi Bus Terminal Station	茶店子客运站		0.90	8.80	Jinniu
●	●	Yangxi Flyover	羊犀立交	27	1.50	10.30	Jinniu
●	●	Yipintianxia	一品天下	7	0.85	11.15	Jinniu
●	●	Shuhan Road East	蜀汉路东		1.10	12.25	Jinniu
●	●	Baiguolin	白果林		1.25	13.50	Jinniu
●	●	Chengdu University of TCM & Sichuan Provincial People's Hospital	中医大省医院	4 5	1.15	14.65	Qingyang
●	●	Tonghuimen	通惠门		0.85	15.50	Qingyang
●	●	People's Park	人民公园		0.85	16.35	Qingyang
●	●	Tianfu Square	天府广场	1	0.95	17.30	Qingyang
●	●	Chunxi Road	春熙路	3	1.40	18.70	Jinjiang
●	●	Dongmen Bridge	东门大桥		0.95	19.65	Jinjiang
●	●	Niuwangmiao	牛王庙	6	0.80	20.45	Jinjiang
●	●	Niushikou	牛市口	Chengdu BRT	1.60	22.05	Jinjiang
●	●	Dongdalu Road	东大路	8	0.60	22.65	Jinjiang
●	●	Tazishan Park	塔子山公园		1.15	23.80	Jinjiang
●	●	Chengdu East Railway Station	成都东客站	7 ICW	1.65	25.45	Chenghua
●	●	Chengyu Flyover	成渝立交		0.80	26.25	Chenghua
●	●	Huiwangling	惠王陵		1.60	27.85	Longquanyi
●	●	Honghe	洪河		0.95	28.80	Longquanyi
●	●	Chengdu Academy of Governance	成都行政学院		1.50	30.30	Longquanyi
●		Longquanyi Railway Station	龙泉驿火车站	30 (OSI via Longquanyi Railway Station South); CEE	2.79	33.09	Longquanyi
●		Damianpu	大面铺		0.58	33.67	Longquanyi
●		Lianshanpo	连山坡		1.25	34.75	Longquanyi
●		Jiepai	界牌		1.25	36.00	Longquanyi
●		Shufang	书房		1.85	37.85	Longquanyi
●		Longping Road	龙平路		1.90	39.75	Longquanyi
●		Longquanyi	龙泉驿		1.70	41.45	

== Line 3 ==
Station name		Transfer	Distance km		Location
English	Chinese	Transfer	Distance km		Location
Chengdu Medical College	成都医学院		0.00	0.00	Xindu
Southwest Petroleum University	石油大学		0.80	0.80	Xindu
Clock Tower	钟楼		1.12	1.92	Xindu
Machao West Road	马超西路		1.45	3.37	Xindu
Tuanjiexinqu	团结新区		1.10	4.47	Xindu
Jinshuihe	锦水河		0.95	5.42	Xindu
Sanhechang	三河场		1.98	7.40	Xindu
Jinhuasi East Road	金华寺东路		2.05	9.45	Xindu
Botanical Garden	植物园		0.88	10.33	Jinniu
Chengdu Junqu General Hospital	军区总医院		2.20	12.53	Jinniu
Panda Avenue	熊猫大道		2.24	14.77	Chenghua
Chengdu Zoo	动物园		1.39	16.16	Chenghua
Zhaojuesi South Road	昭觉寺南路		1.24	17.40	Chenghua
Sima Bridge	驷马桥	7	1.01	18.41	Chenghua
Lijiatuo	李家沱	Chengdu BRT	0.70	19.11	Chenghua
Qianfeng Road	前锋路	6	1.27	20.38	Chenghua
Hongxing Bridge	红星桥		0.93	21.31	Jinjiang
Chengdu Second People's Hospital	市二医院	4	1.31	22.62	Jinjiang
Chunxi Road	春熙路	2	0.86	23.48	Jinjiang
Xinnanmen	新南门		1.18	24.66	Jinjiang
Moziqiao	磨子桥		0.78	25.44	Wuhou
Sichuan Gymnasium	省体育馆	1	1.26	26.70	Wuhou
Yiguanmiao	衣冠庙		1.37	28.07	Wuhou
Gaoshengqiao	高升桥	5	1.11	29.18	Wuhou
Hongpailou	红牌楼		1.51	30.69	Wuhou
Taipingyuan	太平园	7 10	1.37	32.06	Wuhou
Chuanzang Flrover	川藏立交		1.82	32.88	Wuhou
Wuhou Flyover	武侯立交		1.47	34.35	Wuhou
Wuqing South Road	武青南路	9	0.91	35.26	Wuhou
Shuangfengqiao	双凤桥		1.67	36.93	Wuhou
Longqiao Road	龙桥路	19	2.78	39.71	Shuangliu
Hangdu Street	航都大街		1.86	41.57	Shuangliu
Yingchunqiao	迎春桥		1.55	43.12	Shuangliu
Dongsheng	东升		1.33	44.45	Shuangliu
Shuangliu Square	双流广场		0.90	45.35	Shuangliu
Sanliba	三里坝		1.32	46.67	Shuangliu
Shuangliu West Railway Station	双流西站	10; Shuangliu West railway station (IQW); Chengdu–Guiyang high-speed railway	1.94	48.61	Shuangliu

== Line 4 ==
Station name		Transfer	Distance km		Location
English	Chinese	Transfer	Distance km		Location
Wansheng	万盛		0.00	0.00	Wenjiang
Yangliuhe	杨柳河		1.32	1.32	Wenjiang
Fengxihe	凤溪河	19	1.42	2.74	Wenjiang
Nanxun Avenue	南熏大道		0.91	3.65	Wenjiang
Guanghua Park	光华公园		1.02	4.67	Wenjiang
Yongquan	涌泉		1.23	5.90	Wenjiang
Fenghuang Street	凤凰大街		1.84	7.74	Wenjiang
Machangba	马厂坝		1.52	9.26	Wenjiang
Intangible Cultural Heritage Park	非遗博览园		1.63	10.89	Qingyang
Caiqiao	蔡桥		2.30	13.19	Qingyang
Zhongba	中坝		2.15	15.34	Qingyang
Chengdu West Railway Station	成都西站	9 CMW T2	2.20	17.54	Qingyang
Qingjiang Road West	清江西路		2.15	19.69	Qingyang
Culture Palace	文化宫	7	1.15	20.84	Qingyang
Southwestern University of Finance and Economics	西南财大		1.10	21.94	Qingyang
Caotang North Road	草堂北路		0.75	22.69	Qingyang
Chengdu University of TCM & Sichuan Provincial People's Hospital	中医大省医院	2 5	1.20	23.89	Qingyang
Kuanzhaixiangzi Alleys	宽窄巷子		0.90	24.79	Qingyang
Luomashi	骡马市	1	1.60	26.39	Qingyang
Taisheng South Road	太升南路		1.05	27.44	Qingyang
Chengdu Second People's Hospital	市二医院	3	1.40	28.84	Jinjiang
Yushuang Road	玉双路	6	1.45	30.29	Chenghua
Shuangqiao Road	双桥路	8	1.60	31.89	Chenghua
Wannianchang	万年场		0.75	32.64	Chenghua
Huaishudian	槐树店	7	2.13	34.77	Chenghua
Lailong	来龙		2.30	37.07	Longquanyi
Shiling	十陵		1.00	38.07	Longquanyi
Chengdu University	成都大学		0.90	38.97	Longquanyi
Mingshuwangling	明蜀王陵		1.18	40.15	Longquanyi
Xihe	西河		2.82	42.97	Longquanyi

== Line 5 ==
Station name		Transfer	Distance km		Location
English	Chinese	Transfer	Distance km		Location
Huagui Road	华桂路		-	0.000	Xindu
Baishuichang	柏水场		1.139	1.139	Xindu
Liaojiawan	廖家湾		0.856	1.995	Xindu
Beibu Shopping Mall	北部商贸城		1.983	3.978	Jinniu
Xingfuqiao	幸福桥		1.582	5.560	Jinniu
Jiudaoyan	九道堰		0.932	6.492	Jinniu
Dujianian	杜家碾		0.766	7.258	Jinniu
Dafeng	大丰		0.848	8.106	Xindu
Shixi Park	石犀公园		1.711	9.817	Xindu
Huanghuayuan	皇花园		0.816	10.633	Xindu
Lujiaqiao	陆家桥		1.123	11.756	Jinniu
Quanshui Road	泉水路		1.299	13.055	Jinniu
Dongzikou	洞子口	27	1.038	14.093	Jinniu
Funing Road	福宁路		0.769	14.862	Jinniu
Wukuaishi	五块石		0.921	15.783	Jinniu
Saiyuntai	赛云台		0.765	16.548	Jinniu
2nd Beizhan West Road	北站西二路	7	0.775	17.323	Jinniu
Xibei Bridge	西北桥	6	1.499	18.822	Jinniu
Huapaifang	花牌坊		0.906	19.728	Jinniu
Fuqin	抚琴		0.998	20.726	Jinniu
Chengdu University of TCM & Sichuan Provincial People's Hospital	中医大省医院	2 4	1.293	22.019	Qingyang
Qingyang Taoist Temple	青羊宫		0.676	22.695	Qingyang
Provincial Orthopaedics Hospital	省骨科医院		0.915	23.610	Qingyang
Gaoshengqiao	高升桥	3	1.358	24.968	Wuhou
Keyuan	科园		1.400	26.368	High-Tech Zone
Jiuxing Avenue	九兴大道	8	0.959	27.327	High-Tech Zone
Shenxianshu	神仙树	7	1.599	28.926	High-Tech Zone
Shiyang Flyover	石羊立交		1.811	30.737	High-Tech Zone
Chengdu First People's Hospital	市一医院		0.662	31.399	High-Tech Zone
Jiaozi Avenue	交子大道		0.851	32.250	High-Tech Zone
Jincheng Avenue	锦城大道	9	0.858	33.108	High-Tech Zone
Jincheng Lake	锦城湖		1.334	34.442	High-Tech Zone
Dayuan	大源		1.503	35.945	High-Tech Zone
Minle	民乐		1.027	36.972	High-Tech Zone
Qilong	骑龙		1.722	38.694	Tianfu New Area
The Police College	警官学院		1.449	40.143	Tianfu New Area
Erjiang Temple	二江寺		1.479	41.622	Tianfu New Area
Nanhu Flyover	南湖立交		1.292	42.914	Tianfu New Area
Yixin Lake	怡心湖	19	2.034	44.948	Tianfu New Area
Longma Road	龙马路		1.649	46.597	Tianfu New Area
Huilong	回龙	6	1.605	48.202	Tianfu New Area

== Line 6 ==
Station name		Transfer	Distance km		Location
English	Chinese	Transfer	Distance km		Location
Wangcong Temple	望丛祠		--	0.000	Pidu
Heping Street	和平街		1.185	1.185	Pidu
Pitong Street	郫筒		0.859	2.044	Pidu
Shuxin Avenue	蜀新大道		0.994	3.038	Pidu
Mengzi	檬梓		1.285	4.323	Pidu
Shangjin Road	尚锦路		1.224	5.547	Pidu
Honggao Road	红高路		1.546	7.093	Pidu
Tianyu Road	天宇路		2.435	9.528	Pidu
Xipu Railway Station	犀浦	2	1.869	11.397	Pidu
Southwest Jiaotong University & Xingye North Street	交大兴业北街		1.582	12.979	Pidu
Zitonggong	梓潼宫		1.535	14.514	Pidu
Houjiaqiao	侯家桥		1.658	16.172	Jinniu
Xingsheng	兴盛		1.888	18.060	Jinniu
Qinggang	青杠		0.725	18.785	Jinniu
Xihua Avenue	西华大道		0.936	19.721	Jinniu
Jinfu	金府	27	1.016	20.737	Jinniu
Xinghe	星河		1.150	21.887	Jinniu
Southwest Jiaotong University	西南交大	7	0.905	22.792	Jinniu
Shawan	沙湾		0.726	23.518	Jinniu
Xibei Bridge	西北桥	5	0.933	24.451	Jinniu
Renmin North Road	人民北路	1	1.331	25.782	Jinniu
Liangjiaxiang	梁家巷		1.198	26.980	Jinniu
Qianfeng Road	前锋路	3	1.033	28.013	Chenghua
University of Electronic Science and Technology of China & Jianshe North Road	电子科大建设北路		0.955	28.968	Chenghua
Xinhong Road	新鸿路		0.936	29.904	Chenghua
Yushuang Road	玉双路	4	1.114	31.018	Chenghua
Niuwangmiao	牛王庙	2	1.190	32.208	Jinjiang
Shunjiang Road	顺江路		1.134	33.342	Jinjiang
Sanguantang	三官堂		0.779	34.121	Jinjiang
Dongguang	东光	8	1.139	35.260	Jinjiang
Liulichang	琉璃场	7	1.320	36.580	Jinjiang
Liusan Road	琉三路		0.819	37.399	Jinjiang
Jinshi Road	金石路		1.584	38.983	Jinjiang
Financial City East	金融城东	9	1.380	40.363	Jinjiang
Zhonghe	中和		2.832	43.195	Shuangliu
Zhangjiasi	张家寺		1.022	44.217	Shuangliu
Luxiao	陆肖		1.332	45.549	Shuangliu
Guandong	观东		0.786	46.335	Shuangliu
Xintong Avenue	新通大道		1.000	47.335	Shuangliu
Xinchuan Road	新川路		0.763	48.098	Shuangliu
Longdengshan	龙灯山		0.767	48.865	Shuangliu
Pucaotang	蒲草塘		0.915	49.780	Shuangliu
Wan'an	万安		0.762	50.542	Shuangliu
Lushan Avenue	麓山大道		1.360	51.902	Shuangliu
Shenyang Road	沈阳路		1.794	53.696	Shuangliu
Qingdao Road	青岛路		--		Shuangliu
Changgongyan	昌公堰		2.462	56.158	Shuangliu
Hangzhou Road	杭州路		1.206	57.364	Shuangliu
Tianfu Commercial District	天府商务区	19	1.075	58.439	Shuangliu
Western China Int'l Expo City	西博城	1 18	1.278	59.717	Shuangliu
Qinhuangsi	秦皇寺		1.332	61.049	Shuangliu
Songlin	松林		1.480	62.529	Shuangliu
Lujiao	芦角	Under Construction	--		Shuangliu
Diaoyuzui	钓鱼嘴		1.824	64.353	Shuangliu
Huilong	回龙	5	2.151	66.504	Shuangliu
Lanjiagou	兰家沟		1.719	68.223	Shuangliu

== Line 7 ==
Station name		Transfer	Distance km		Location
English	Chinese	Transfer	Distance km		Location
— ↑ Loop line towards Chengdu University of Technology ↑ —			0.931	0.931	
Cuijiadian	崔家店		0.000	0.000	Chenghua
Shuangdian Road	双店路		1.012	1.012	Chenghua
Huaishudian	槐树店	4	0.855	1.867	Chenghua
Yinghui Road	迎晖路		1.523	3.390	Chenghua
Chengdu East Railway Station	成都东客站	2 CDD	1.090	4.480	Chenghua
Daguan	大观		1.237	5.717	Chenghua
Shizishan	狮子山		1.125	6.842	Jinjiang
Sichuan Normal University	四川师大		1.144	7.986	Jinjiang
Liulichang	琉璃场	6	1.553	9.539	Jinjiang
Sanwayao	三瓦窑		2.419	11.958	Jinjiang/Wuhou
South Railway Station	火车南站	1 18 Tram Rong Line 1 CDN	1.018	12.976	Wuhou
Shenxianshu	神仙树	5	1.944	14.920	Wuhou
Gaopeng Avenue	高朋大道	8	1.784	16.704	Wuhou
Taipingyuan	太平园	3 10	1.443	18.147	Wuhou
Wuhou Avenue	武侯大道		1.467	19.614	Wuhou
Longzhuayan	龙爪堰		1.672	21.286	Wuhou
Dongpo Road	东坡路		1.061	22.347	Qingyang
Culture Palace	文化宫	4	1.184	23.531	Qingyang
Jinsha Site Museum	金沙博物馆		0.759	24.290	Qingyang
Yipintianxia	一品天下	2	1.543	25.843	Jinniu
Chadianzi	茶店子		1.225	27.058	Jinniu
Huazhaobi	花照壁		1.106	28.164	Jinniu
Southwest Jiaotong University	西南交大	6	0.853	29.017	Jinniu
Jiulidi	九里堤		0.768	29.785	Jinniu
2nd Beizhan West Road	北站西二路	5	0.879	30.664	Jinniu
North Railway Station	火车北站	1 CG CDU	0.738	31.402	Jinniu
Sima Bridge	驷马桥	3	1.965	33.367	Jinniu/Chenghua
Fuqing Road	府青路		1.285	34.652	Chenghua
Balizhuang	八里庄		1.308	35.960	Chenghua
Erxianqiao	二仙桥		1.050	37.010	Chenghua
Chengdu University of Technology	理工大学	8	1.188	38.198	Chenghua
— ↓ Loop line towards Cuijiadian ↓ —			0.931	39.129	

== Line 8 ==
Station name		Transfer	Distance km		Location
English	Chinese	Transfer	Distance km		Location
Guilong Road	桂龙路		--	0	Chenghua
Guilin	桂林		0.957	0.957	Chenghua
Tongle	同乐		1.173	2.130	Chenghua
Longtan Temple	龙潭寺		1.105	3.235	Chenghua
Longtan Flyover	龙潭立交		1.186	4.421	Chenghua
Shengdeng Park	圣灯公园		0.950	5.371	Chenghua
Shilidian	十里店		0.780	6.151	Chenghua
Chengdu University of Technology	理工大学	7	0.832	6.983	Chenghua
Dongjiao Memory	东郊记忆		1.041	8.024	Chenghua
Shabanqiao	杉板桥		1.053	9.077	Chenghua
Wannian Road	万年路		1.221	10.298	Chenghua
Shuangqiao Road	双桥路	4	1.004	11.302	Chenghua
Dongdalu Road	东大路	2	1.564	12.866	Jinjiang
Jingjusi	净居寺		1.493	14.359	Jinjiang
Dongguang	东光	6	0.762	15.121	Jinjiang
Donghu Park	东湖公园		0.954	16.075	Jinjiang
Sichuan University Wangjiang Campus	川大望江校区		1.416	17.491	Wuhou
Nijiaqiao	倪家桥	1	0.964	18.455	Wuhou
Fangcao Street	芳草街		1.248	19.703	Wuhou
Yongfeng	永丰		0.625	20.328	Wuhou
Jiuxing Avenue	九兴大道	5	1.224	21.552	Wuhou
Gaopeng Avenue	高朋大道	7	0.606	22.158	Wuhou
Yinjialin	殷家林		1.288	23.446	Wuhou
Qing'an	庆安		0.841	24.287	Wuhou
Shiyang	石羊		1.513	25.800	Wuhou
Sanyuan	三元	9	0.645	26.445	Wuhou
Shunfeng	顺风		1.605	28.050	Shuangliu
Zhujiang Road	珠江路		1.438	29.488	Shuangliu
Sichuan University Jiang'an Campus	川大江安校区		1.569	31.057	Shuangliu
Wenxing	文星		1.697	32.754	Shuangliu
Lianhua	莲花		1.320	34.074	Shuangliu
Longgang	龙港	19	1.250	35.324	Shuangliu

== Line 9 ==
Station name		Transfer	Distance km		Location
English	Chinese	Transfer	Distance km		Location
Financial City East	金融城东	6	--	0.000	Jinjiang
Xindao	心岛		1.257	1.257	Wuhou
Incubation Park	孵化园	1 18	0.645	1.902	Wuhou
Jincheng Avenue	锦城大道	5	1.557	3.459	Wuhou
Sanyuan	三元	8	2.532	5.991	Wuhou
Taiping Temple	太平寺		1.794	7.785	Wuhou
Huaxing	华兴	10	1.442	9.227	Wuhou
Cuqiao	簇桥		1.616	10.843	Wuhou
Wuqing South Road	武青南路	3	1.702	12.545	Wuhou
Jitouqiao	机投桥	17	2.766	15.311	Wuhou
Peifeng	培风		1.671	16.982	Wuhou
Chengdu West Railway Station	成都西站	4 CMW T2	2.640	19.622	Qingyang
Huangtianba	黄田坝		1.826	21.448	Qingyang

== Line 10 ==
Station name		Transfer	Distance km		Location
English	Chinese	Transfer	Distance km		Location
Wuhou Shrine	武侯祠				Wuhou
Gaoshengqiao	高升桥	3 5			Wuhou
Hongpailou	红牌楼	3			Wuhou
Taipingyuan	太平园	3 7	0.00	0.00	Wuhou
Cujin	簇锦		1.980	1.980	Wuhou
Huaxing	华兴	9	1.584	3.564	Wuhou
Jinhua	金花		3.575	7.139	Wuhou
Shuangliu International Airport Terminal 1	双流机场1航站楼	CTU	1.837	8.976	Shuangliu
Shuangliu International Airport Terminal 2	双流机场2航站楼	19 (Note: Out-of-system interchange via East of Terminal 2 of Shuangliu International Airport) CTU IPW	1.001	9.977	Shuangliu
Shuangliu West Railway Station	双流西站	3 Shuangliu West (IQW); Chenggui HSR	5.099	15.076	Shuangliu
Yingtian Temple	应天寺		1.494	16.570	Shuangliu
Huangshui	黄水		2.346	18.916	Shuangliu
Huayuan	花源		3.671	22.587	Xinjin
Xinjin Railway Station	新津站	Xinjin (IRW); Chenggui HSR	2.597	25.184	Xinjin
Huaqiao	花桥		2.824	28.008	Xinjin
Wujin	五津		5.019	33.027	Xinjin
Rulin Road	儒林路		1.250	34.277	Xinjin
Liujianian	刘家碾		1.220	35.497	Xinjin
Xinping	新平		1.252	36.749	Xinjin

== Line 13 ==
Station name		Connections
English	Chinese	Connections
Wayaotan	瓦窑滩	
Wanjiawan	万家湾	
Peifeng	培风	9
Wanshou Bridge	万寿桥	
Dongpo Road	东坡路	7
Guanghuacun	光华村	
Du Fu Thatched Cottage	杜甫草堂	
Qingyang Taoist Temple	青羊宫	5
Xiaonan Street	小南街	17
Wenweng Shishi	文翁石室	10
Huaxiba	华西坝	1
Xinnanmen	新南门	3
Jiuyan Bridge	九眼桥	
Sanguantang	三官堂	6
Jingjusi	净居寺	8
Sichuan Normal University	四川师大	7
Jiaozi Flyover	娇子立交	30
Xingfu Meilin	幸福梅林	
Sansheng Flower Town	三圣花乡	
Longhuasi	龙华寺	
Long'an	龙安	

== Line 17 ==
Station №	Station name		Transfer	Distance km		Location
Station №	English	Chinese	Transfer	Distance km		Location
1701	Gaohong	高洪				Chenghua
1702	Weiling	威灵				Chenghua
1703	Hangtian Road	航天路				Chenghua
1704	Renmintang	人民塘				Chenghua
1705	Jichechang	机车厂				Chenghua
1706	Erxianqiao	二仙桥	7			Chenghua
1707	Tashui Bridge	踏水桥				Chenghua
1708	Jianshe North Road	建设北路	6			Chenghua
1709	Hongxing Bridge	红星桥	3			Jinniu
1710	Chenghuangmiao	城隍庙				Jinniu
1711	Xidajie Street	西大街				Qingyang
1712	People's Park	人民公园	2 10			Qingyang
1713	Xiaonan Street	小南街	13			Qingyang
1714	Provincial Orthopaedics Hospital	省骨科医院	5			Qingyang
1715	Huanhua Lane	浣花里				Wuhou
1716	Qingshuihe Bridge	清水河大桥				Wuhou
1717	Longzhuayan	龙爪堰	7			Wuhou
1718	Yanggongqiao	阳公桥				Wuhou
1719	Jitouqiao	机投桥	9	——	0.000	Wuhou
1720	Baifoqiao	白佛桥		1.468	1.468	Wuhou
1721	Jiujiang North	九江北	19	4.179	5.647	Shuangliu

== Line 18 ==
Service routes					Station name		Transfer	Distance km		Location
Local		Through			English	Chinese	Transfer	Distance km		Location
					North Railway Station	火车北站	1 7 Chengdu			Jinniu
					Luomashi	骡马市	1 4 10			Qingyang
					Sichuan Gymnasium	省体育馆	1 3			Wuhou
					Nijiaqiao	倪家桥	1 8			Wuhou
●	●	●			South Railway Station	火车南站	1 7 Chengdu South	-	0	Wuhou (South High-Tech Zone)
●	●	｜			Incubation Park	孵化园	1 9	3.003	3.003	Wuhou (South High-Tech Zone)
●	●	｜			Jincheng Plaza East	锦城广场东		0.943	3.946	Wuhou (South High-Tech Zone)
●	●	｜			Century City	世纪城	1	1.514	5.460	Wuhou (South High-Tech Zone)
●	●	｜			Haichang Road	海昌路	1	6.884	12.344	Shuangliu (Tianfu New Area)
●	●	｜			Western China Int'l Expo City	西博城	1 6	7.533	19.877	Shuangliu (Tianfu New Area)
●	●	｜			Xinglong	兴隆		3.914	23.791	Shuangliu (Tianfu New Area)
●	●	｜			Tianfu Station (Note: Only interchange between Lines 18 and 19 available, no entrances and exits at the moment.)	天府站	19; Tianfu (U/C)	5.237	29.028	Shuangliu (Tianfu New Area)
				↑	Through-service to/from Jinxing of Line 19					
					↑	direct through service to/from East of Terminal 2 of Shuangliu International Airport of Line 19				
●		｜	●	｜	Sancha	三岔		19.161	48.189	Jianyang (East New Area)
●		｜	●	｜	Futian	福田	S3	7.985	56.174	Jianyang (East New Area)
｜		｜	｜	｜	Terminal 3 & 4 of Tianfu International Airport (reserved station)	天府机场3号4号航站楼	TFU	9.176	—	Jianyang (East New Area)
●		●	●	●	Terminal 1 & 2 of Tianfu International Airport	天府机场1号2号航站楼	TFU	9.176	65.350	Jianyang (East New Area)
●		●	●		Tianfu International Airport North	天府机场北		2.596	67.946	Jianyang (East New Area)
					Guanyan	官堰				Jianyang (East New Area)

== Line 19 ==
Service routes			Station name		Transfer	Distance km		Location
Service routes			English	Chinese	Transfer	Distance km		Location
●	●		Jinxing	金星		——	0	Wenjiang
●	●		Huangshi	黄石		4.442	4.442	Wenjiang
●	●		Chengdu Fifth People's Hospital	市五医院		2.935	7.377	Wenjiang
●	●		Fengxihe	凤溪河	4	1.858	9.235	Wenjiang
●	●		Wenquan Avenue	温泉大道		2.084	11.319	Wenjiang
●	●		Mingguang	明光		1.784	13.103	Wenjiang
●	●		Jiujiang North	九江北	17	6.721	19.824	Shuangliu
●	●		Longqiao Road	龙桥路	3	4.477	24.301	Shuangliu
●	●	●	East of Terminal 2 of Shuangliu International Airport	双流机场2航站楼东	10 (Note: Out-of-system interchange via Terminal 2 of Shuangliu International Airport); IPW CTU	5.604	29.905	Shuangliu
●	●	｜	Longgang	龙港	8	4.643	34.548	Shuangliu
●	●	｜	Wenjiashan	温家山		5.840	40.388	Shuangliu
●	●	｜	Muhua Road	牧华路		1.457	41.845	Shuangliu
●	●	｜	Yixin Lake	怡心湖	5	2.180	44.025	Tianfu New Area
●	●	｜	Zhengxingwan	正兴湾		2.696	46.721	Tianfu New Area
●	●	｜	Honglian	红莲		3.318	50.039	Tianfu New Area
●	●	｜	Tianfu Commercial District	天府商务区	6	2.386	52.425	Tianfu New Area
●	●	｜	Lanjiadian	蓝家店		2.606	55.031	Tianfu New Area
●	●	｜	Tianfu Station	天府站	18; Tianfu (U/C)	5.108	60.139	Tianfu New Area
	↓	↓	Through-service to/from Tianfu International Airport North of Line 18					
			Hejiang (Note: Hejiang station is a long-term reserved station and not operational at the moment.)	合江		2.414	62.553	Tianfu New Area

== Line 27 ==
Services		Station name		Transfer	District
Services		English	Chinese	Transfer	District
●		Shifo	石佛		Xindu
●		Ciyi	慈义		Xindu
●		Xingcheng Avenue	兴城大道		Xindu
●		Zhantan Temple	旃檀寺		Xindu
●		Shimenkan	石门坎		Jinniu
●	●	Sanshengsi	三圣寺		Jinniu
●	●	Fanjia Alley	范家巷		Jinniu
●	●	Liyuwan	鲤鱼湾		Jinniu
|	|	Bairendian	白仁店		Jinniu
●	●	Laijiadian	赖家店		Jinniu
●	●	Weijianian	韦家碾	1	Jinniu
●	●	Shuangshuinian	双水碾		Chenghua
●	●	Wangjiaqiao	王贾桥		Jinniu
●	●	Dongzikou	洞子口	5	Jinniu
●	●	Shaheyuan	沙河源		Jinniu
●	●	Xinqiao	新桥		Jinniu
●	●	Jinfu	金府	6	Jinniu
●	●	Huazhaobi North	花照壁北		Jinniu
●	●	Jinniu Park	金牛公园		Jinniu
●	●	Yangxi Flyover	羊犀立交	2	Jinniu
●	●	Huangzhong	黄忠		Jinniu
●	●	Jinsha Binhe Park	金沙滨河公园		Qingyang
●	●	Shuxin Road	蜀鑫路		Qingyang

== Line 30 ==
Station name		Transfer	Distance km		Location
English	Chinese	Transfer	Distance km		Location
East of Terminal 2 of Shuangliu International Airport	双流机场2航站楼东	19; 10 (OSI via Terminal 2 of Shuangliu International Airport); IPW; CTU	0.00	0.00	Shuangliu
Sisheng	寺圣		2.09	2.09	Shuangliu
Xingyue	星月		0.81	2.90	Shuangliu
Guangming	光明		0.92	3.82	Shuangliu
Xiejiadu	谢家渡		1.31	4.13	Shuangliu
Zhujiang Road	珠江路	8	0.66	5.79	Shuangliu
Datong	大同		1.34	7.13	Shuangliu
Shiyangdong	石羊东		1.99	9.12	High-Tech Zone
Xinyuan Avenue	新园大道		0.87	9.99	High-Tech Zone
Chengdu First People's Hospital	市一医院	5	1.15	11.14	High-Tech Zone
Yizhou Avenue	益州大道		0.84	11.98	High-Tech Zone
Financial City North	金融城北		0.86	12.84	High-Tech Zone
Fucheng Bridge	府城桥		0.61	13.44	High-Tech Zone
Jinshi Road	金石路	6	1.25	14.69	Jinjiang
Juanzishu	棬子树		1.59	16.28	Jinjiang
Jinyi	锦逸		0.99	17.27	Jinjiang
Jiaozi Flyover	娇子立交		1.70	18.97	Jinjiang
Haitong Street	海桐街		0.90	19.87	Jinjiang
Hangtian Flyover	航天立交		1.01	20.87	Jinjiang
Huiwangling	惠王陵	2	1.07	21.94	Longquanyi
Yushi	玉石		1.37	23.31	Longquanyi
Fenshui	分水		1.09	24.40	Longquanyi
Yuhong Road	玉虹路				Longquanyi
Longquanyi Railway Station South	龙泉驿火车站南	2 (OSI via Longquanyi Railway Station); CEE			Longquanyi

== Line S3 ==
Station name		Transfer	Distance (km)		Location
English	Chinese	Transfer	Distance (km)		Location
Futian	福田	18	0		Jianyang, Chengdu
Lujia	芦葭				Jianyang, Chengdu
Ziyang Airport Economic Zone	资阳临空				Yanjiang, Ziyang
Xingfu Avenue	幸福大道				Yanjiang, Ziyang
Changhong Square	苌弘广场				Yanjiang, Ziyang
Baotai	宝台				Yanjiang, Ziyang
Ziyang Bei Station	资阳北站	Ziyang North		38.7	Yanjiang, Ziyang
