= Jiaozi Avenue station =

Metro station in Chengdu, China

Jiaozi Avenue 交子大道

General information
- Location: High-Tech Zone, Chengdu, Sichuan; China
- Operated by: Chengdu Metro Limited
- Line: Line 5
- Platforms: 2 (1 island platform)

Other information
- Station code: 0530

History
- Opened: 27 December 2019

Services
Preceding station	Chengdu Metro	Following station
Chengdu First People's Hospital towards Huagui Road	Line 5	Jincheng Avenue towards Huilong
Location

Jiaozi Avenue (Chinese: 交子大道) is a station on Line 5 of the Chengdu Metro in China. It was opened on 27 December 2019.
