= Quanshui Road station =

Metro station in Chengdu, China

Quanshui Road 泉水路

General information
- Location: Jinniu District, Chengdu, Sichuan; China
- Coordinates: 30.73258°N 104.05584°E
- Operated by: Chengdu Metro Limited
- Line: Line 5
- Platforms: 2 (1 island platform)

Other information
- Station code: 0512

History
- Opened: 27 December 2019

Services
Preceding station	Chengdu Metro	Following station
Lujiaqiao towards Huagui Road	Line 5	Dongzikou towards Huilong
Location

Quanshui Road (Chinese: 泉水路) is a station on Line 5 of the Chengdu Metro in China. It was opened on 27 December 2019.
