= Wukuaishi station =

Metro station in Chengdu, China

Wukuaishi 五块石
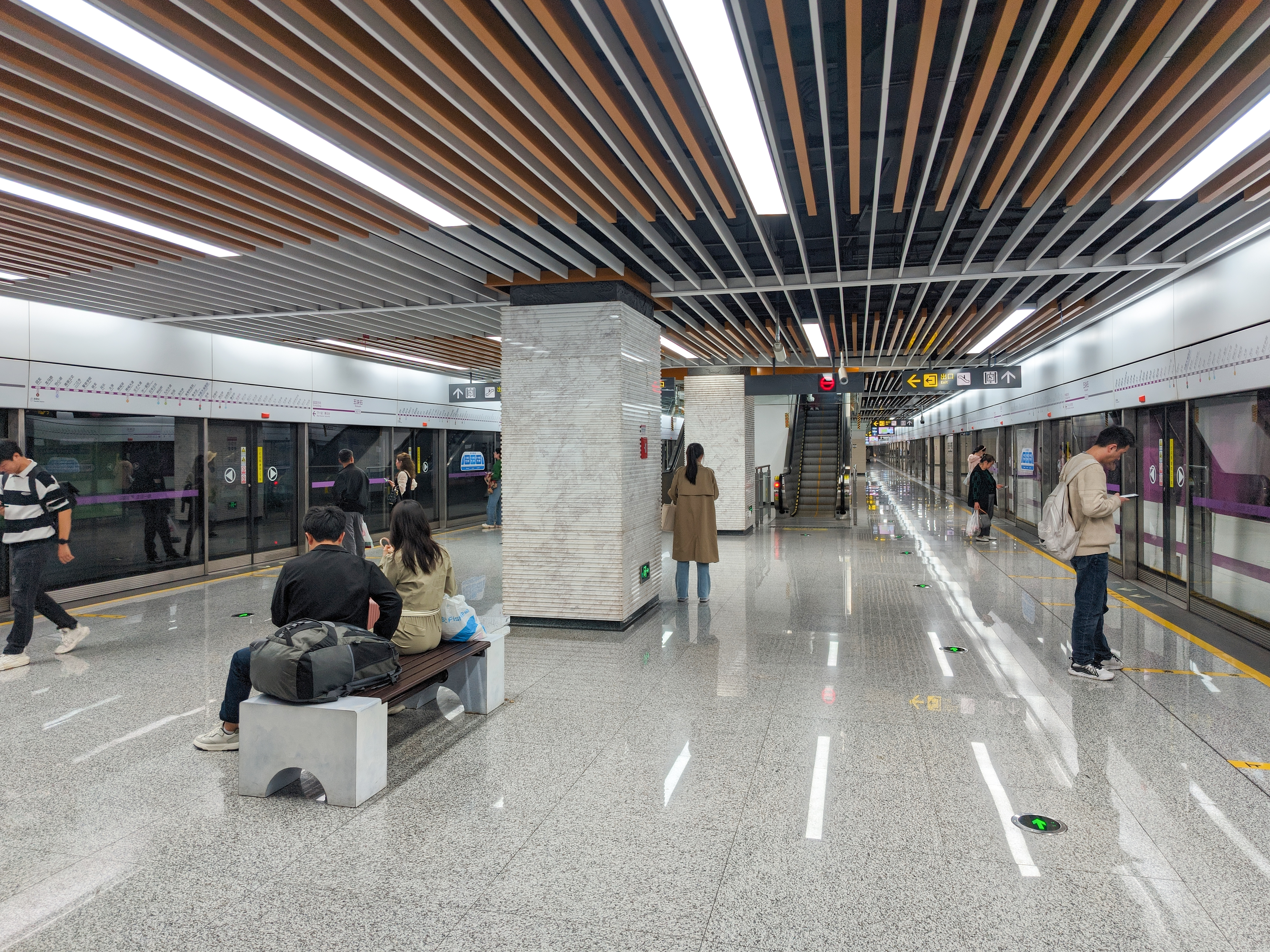

General information
- Location: Jinniu District, Chengdu, Sichuan; China
- Operated by: Chengdu Metro Limited
- Line: Line 5
- Platforms: 2 (1 island platform)

Other information
- Station code: 0515

History
- Opened: 27 December 2019

Services
| Preceding station | Chengdu Metro | Following station |
|---|---|---|
| Funing Road towards Huagui Road | Line 5 | Saiyuntai towards Huilong |
Location

Wukuaishi (Chinese: 五块石) is a station on Line 5 of the Chengdu Metro in China. It was opened on 27 December 2019.
