= Shiyang Flyover station =

Metro station in Chengdu, China

Shiyang Flyover 石羊立交

General information
- Location: High-Tech Zone, Chengdu, Sichuan; China
- Operated by: Chengdu Metro Limited
- Line: Line 5
- Platforms: 2 (1 island platform)

Other information
- Station code: 0528

History
- Opened: 27 December 2019

Services
Preceding station	Chengdu Metro	Following station
Shenxianshu towards Huagui Road	Line 5	Chengdu First People's Hospital towards Huilong
Location

Shiyang Flyover (Chinese: 石羊立交) is a station on Line 5 of the Chengdu Metro in China. It was opened on 27 December 2019.
