= Keyuan station =

Keyuan station can refer to:

- Keyuan station (Chengdu Metro), a metro station in Chengdu, China
- Keyuan station (Shenzhen Metro), a metro station in Shenzhen, China
