= Nanhu Flyover station =

Metro station in Chengdu, China

Nanhu Flyover 南湖立交

General information
- Location: Tianfu New Area, Chengdu, Sichuan; China
- Operated by: Chengdu Metro Limited
- Line: Line 5
- Platforms: 2 (1 island platform)

Other information
- Station code: 0538

History
- Opened: 27 December 2019

Services
Preceding station	Chengdu Metro	Following station
Erjiang Temple towards Huagui Road	Line 5	Yixin Lake towards Huilong
Location

Nanhu Flyover (Chinese: 南湖立交) is a station on Line 5 of the Chengdu Metro in China. It was opened on 27 December 2019.
