= Dayuan station (Chengdu Metro) =

Metro station in Chengdu, China

Dayuan 大源

General information
- Location: High-Tech Zone, Chengdu, Sichuan; China
- Coordinates: 30.55189°N 104.04416°E
- Operated by: Chengdu Metro Limited
- Line(s): Line 5
- Platforms: 2 (1 island platform)

Other information
- Station code: 0533

History
- Opened: 27 December 2019

Services
Preceding station	Chengdu Metro	Following station
Jincheng Lake towards Huagui Road	Line 5	Minle towards Huilong

Dayuan (Chinese: 大源) is a station on Line 5 of the Chengdu Metro in China. It was opened on 27 December 2019.
