= Gaoshengqiao station =

Metro station in Chengdu, China

Gaoshengqiao 高升桥
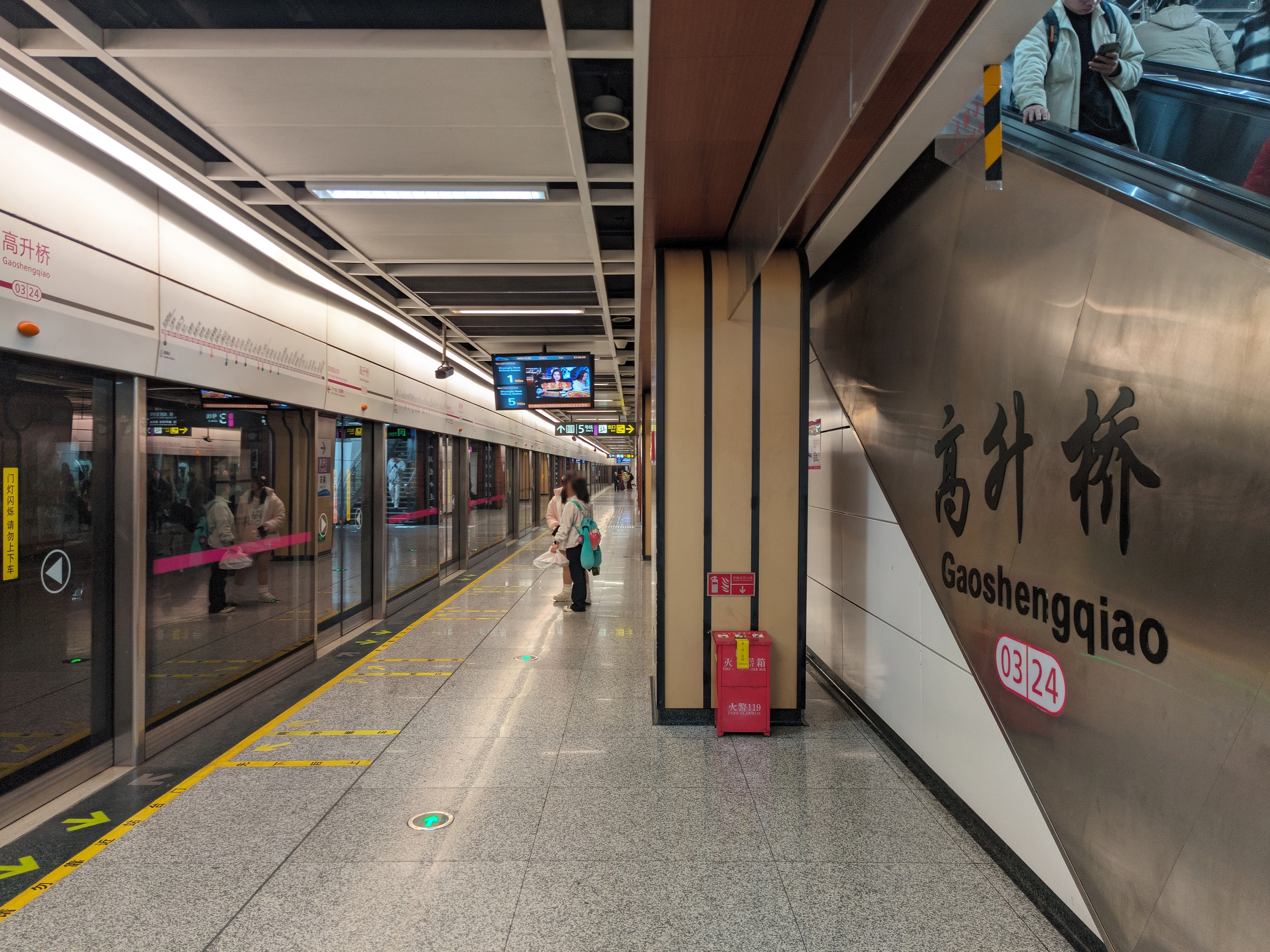
- Line 3 platform

General information
- Location: Wuhou District, Chengdu, Sichuan; China
- Operated by: Chengdu Metro Limited
- Lines: Line 3 Line 5 Line 10
- Platforms: 4 (2 island platforms)

Other information
- Station code: 0324 0524 1005

History
- Opened: 31 July 2016

Services
Preceding station	Chengdu Metro	Following station
Yiguanmiao towards Chengdu Medical College	Line 3	Hongpailou towards Shuangliu West Railway Station
Provincial Orthopaedics Hospital towards Huagui Road	Line 5	Keyuan towards Huilong
Wuhou Shrine Terminus	Line 10	Hongpailou towards Xinping
Location

Gaoshengqiao (Chinese: 高升桥) is a transfer station on Line 3, Line 5 and Line 10 of the Chengdu Metro in China.

== Gallery ==
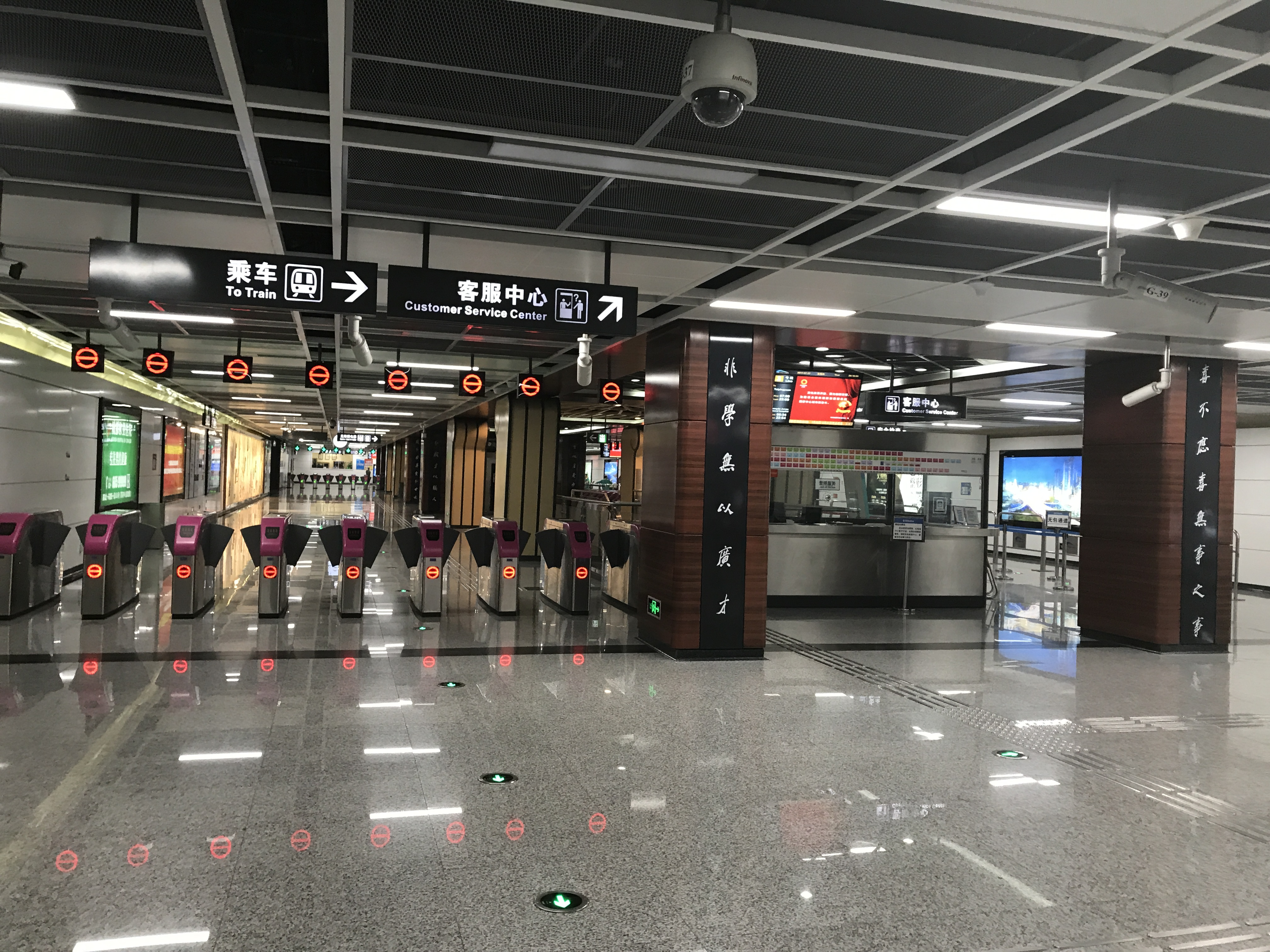
Concourse

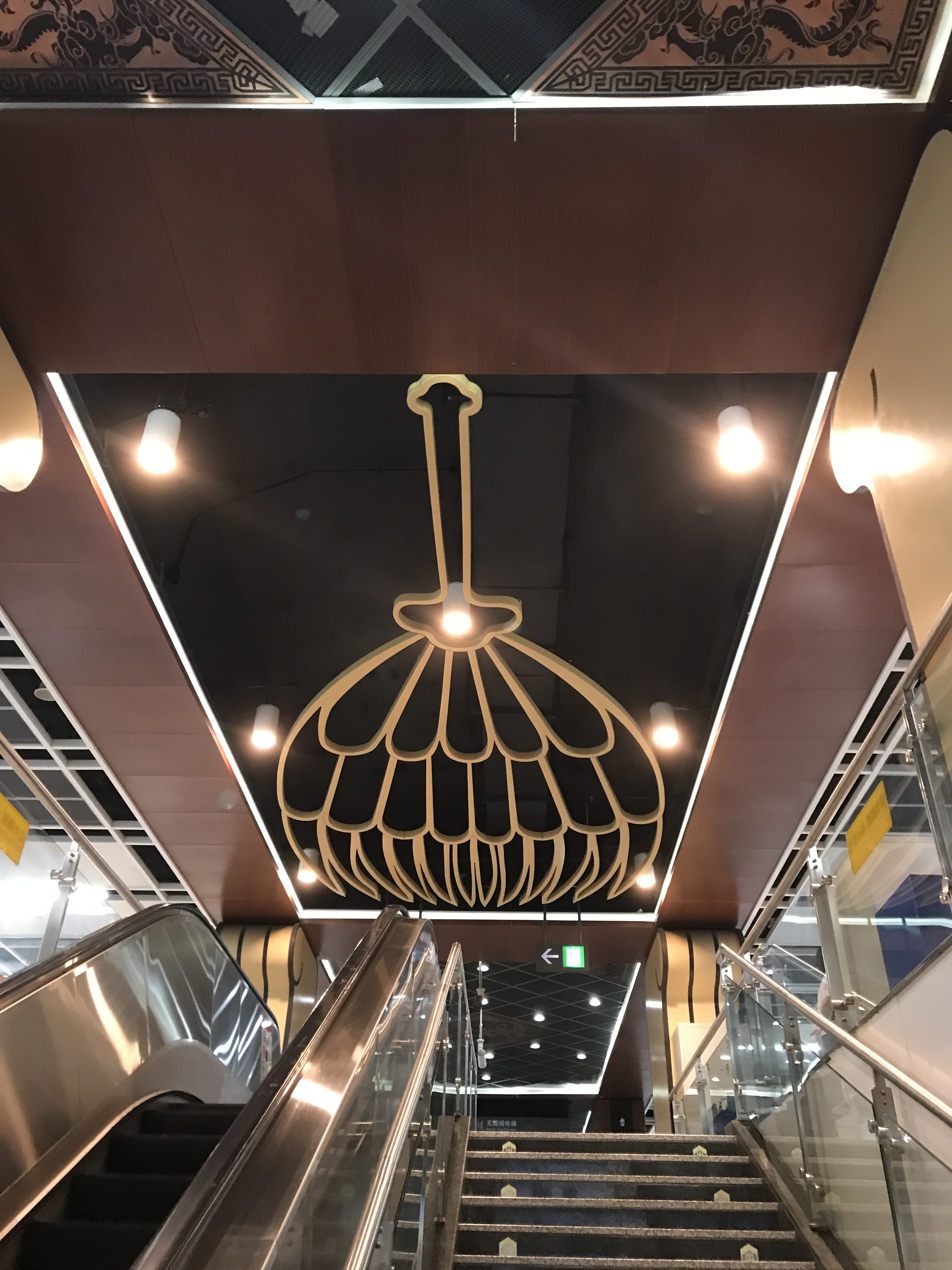
Ceiling art

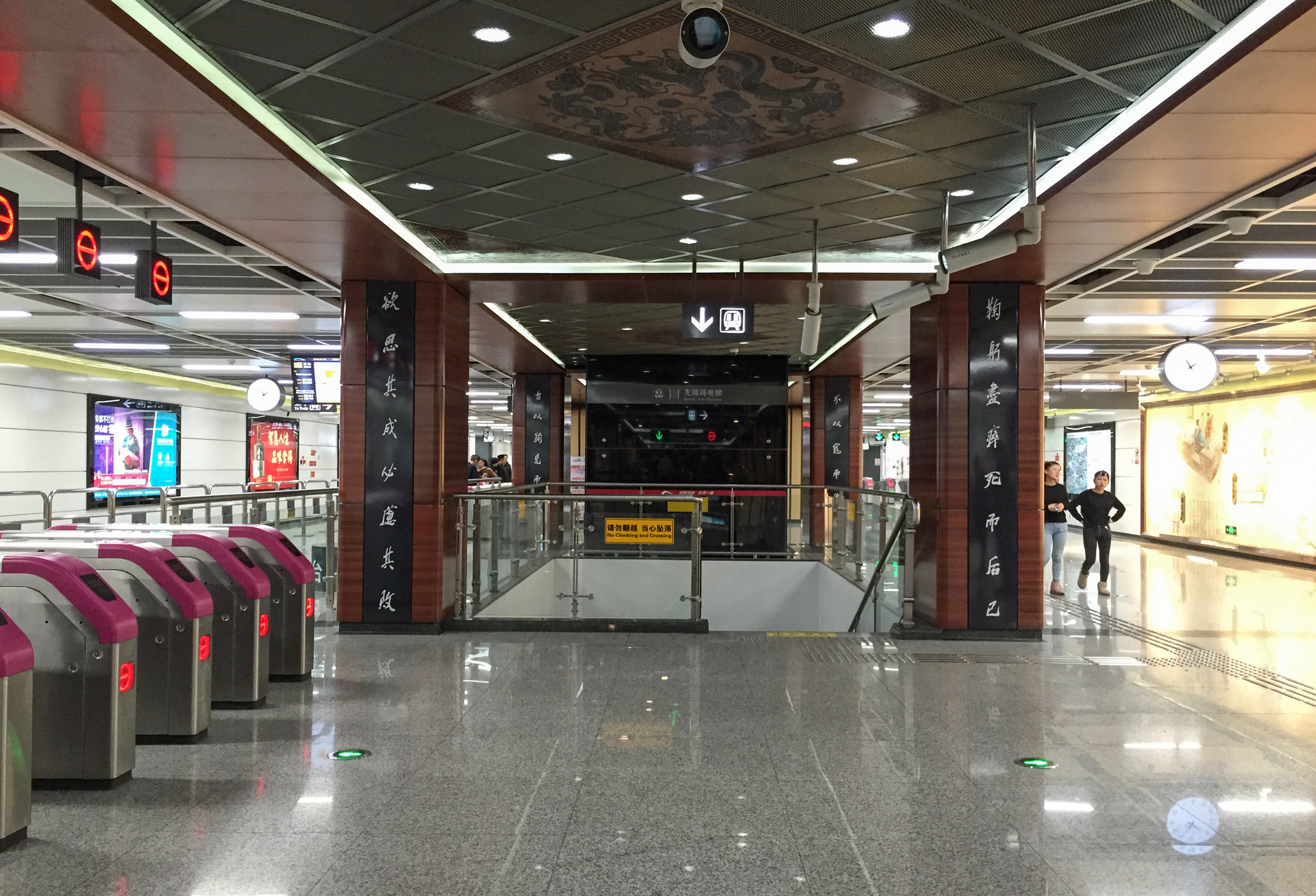
Steps to platform

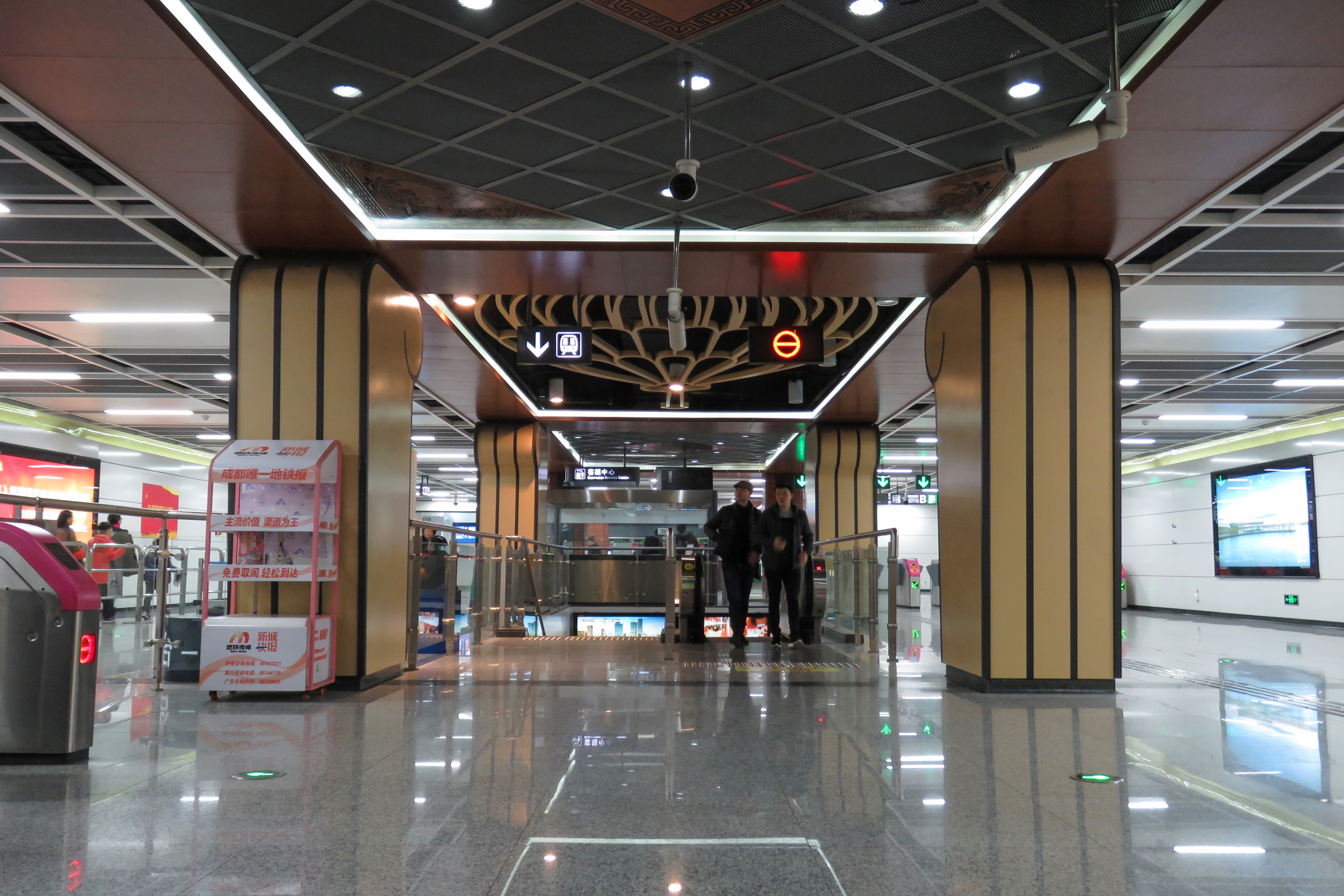
Escalators and steps to platform

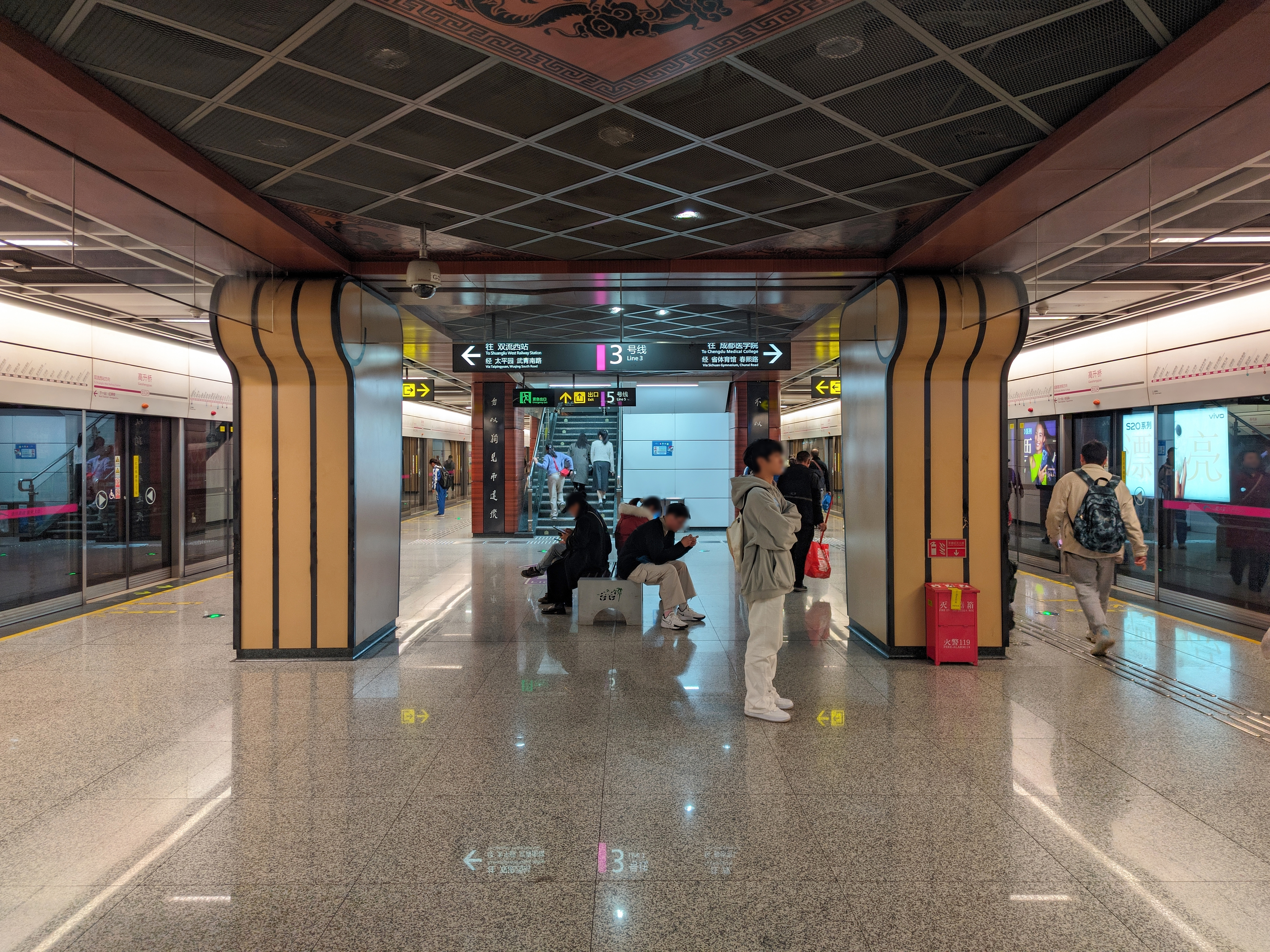
Line 3 platform

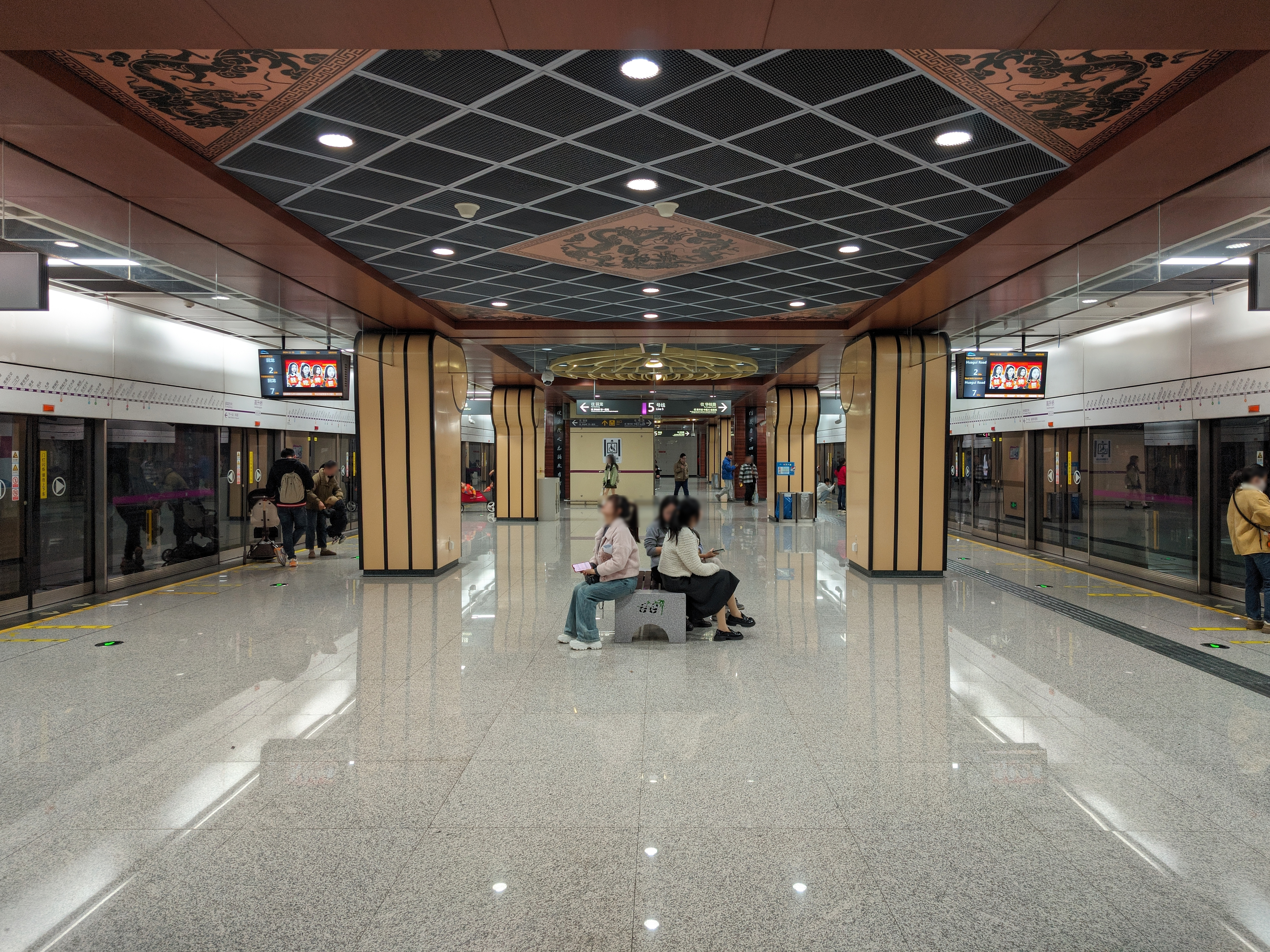
Line 5 platform

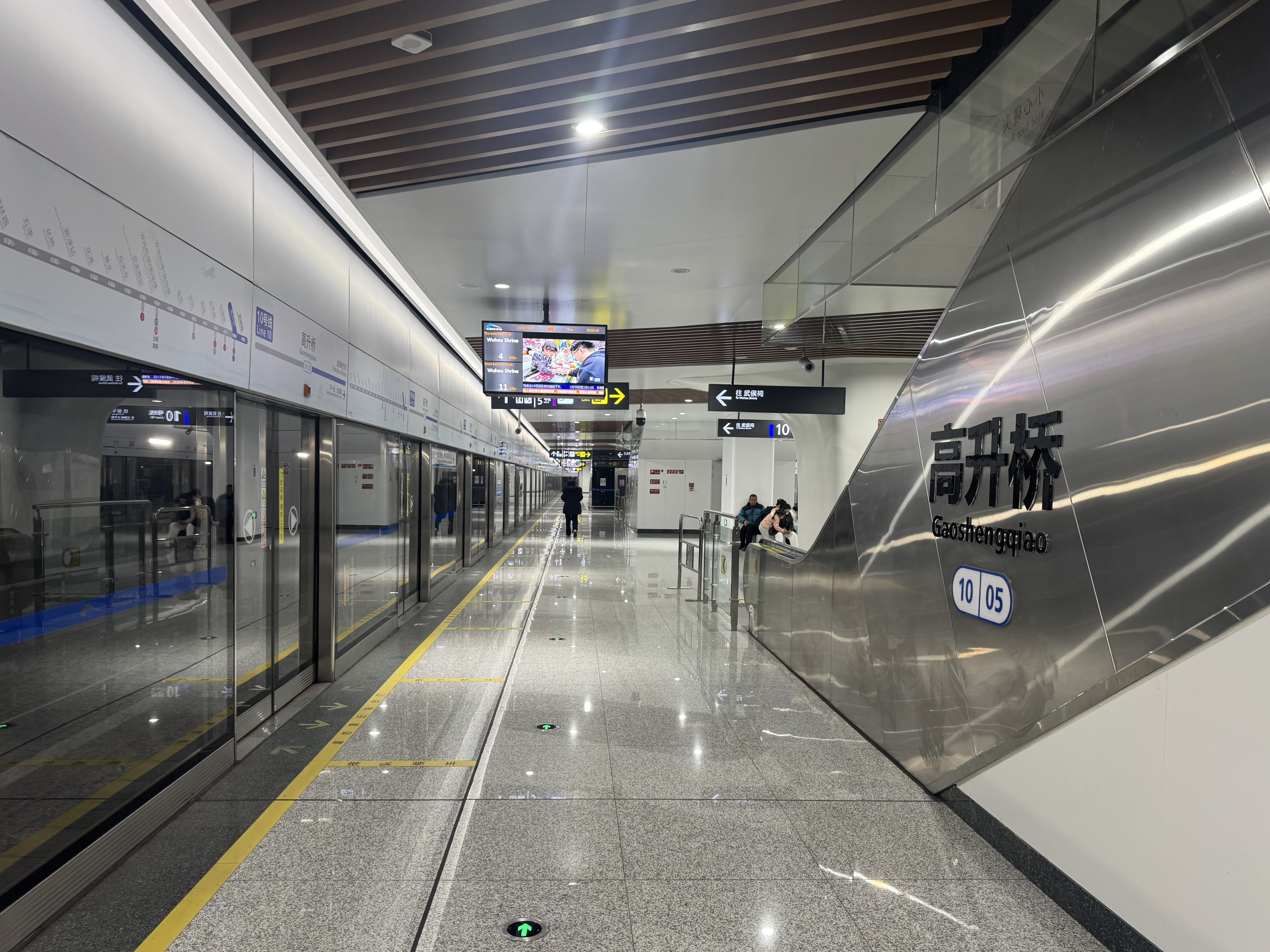
Line 10 platform

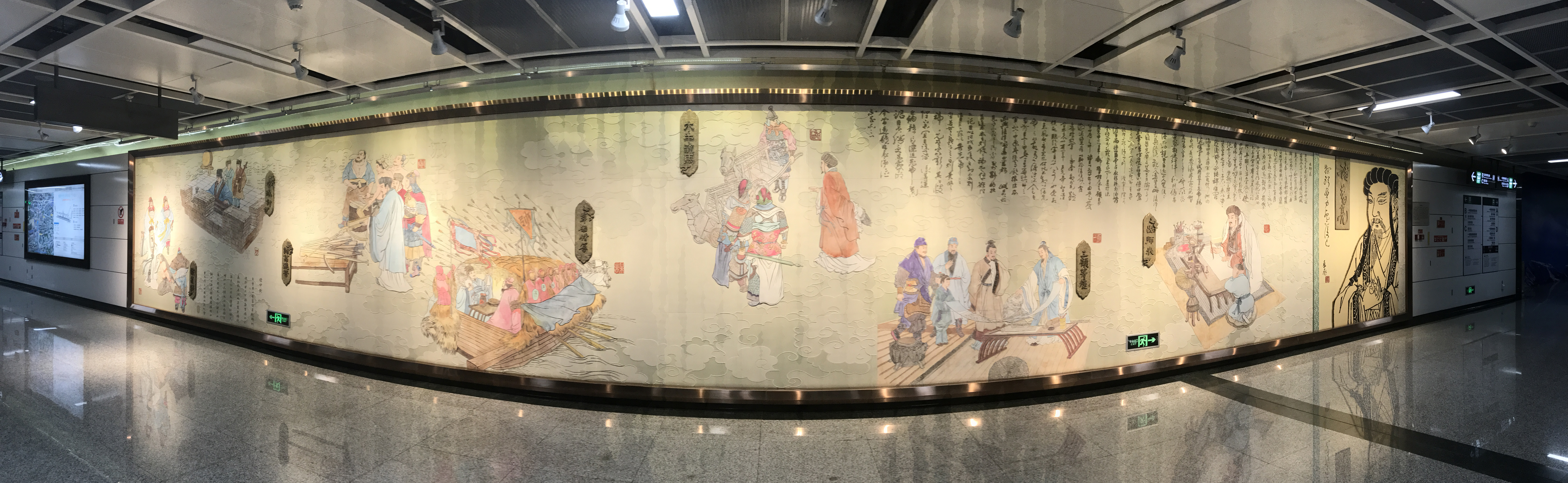
Concourse art wall

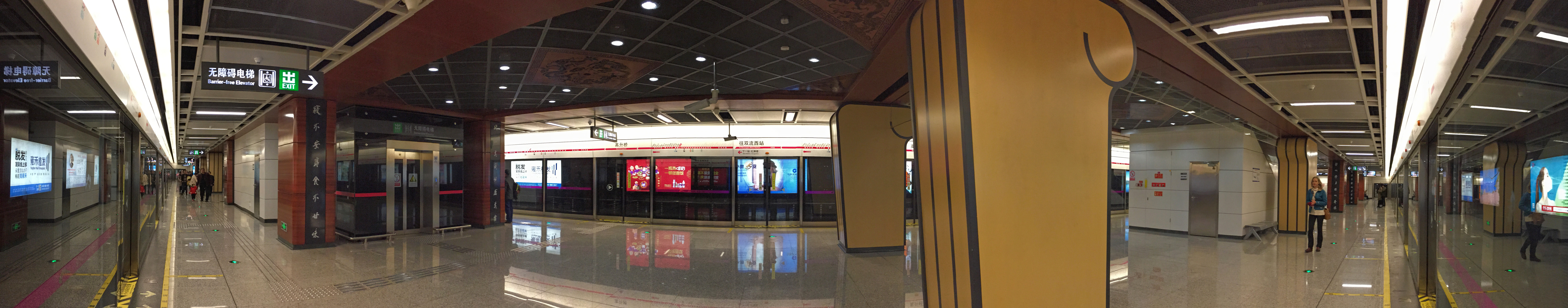
Platform panorama of Gaoshengqiao Station
