= Xingfuqiao station =

Metro station in Chengdu, China

Xingfuqiao 幸福桥

General information
- Location: Jinniu District, Chengdu, Sichuan; China
- Coordinates: 30.77931°N 104.08577°E
- Operated by: Chengdu Metro Limited
- Line: Line 5
- Platforms: 2 (2 side platforms)

Other information
- Station code: 0505

History
- Opened: 27 December 2019

Services
Preceding station	Chengdu Metro	Following station
Beibu Shopping Mall towards Huagui Road	Line 5	Jiudaoyan towards Huilong
Location

Xingfuqiao (Chinese: 幸福桥) is a station on Line 5 of the Chengdu Metro in China. It was opened on 27 December 2019.
