= Beibu Shopping Mall station =

Metro station in Chengdu, China

Beibu Shopping Mall 北部商贸城
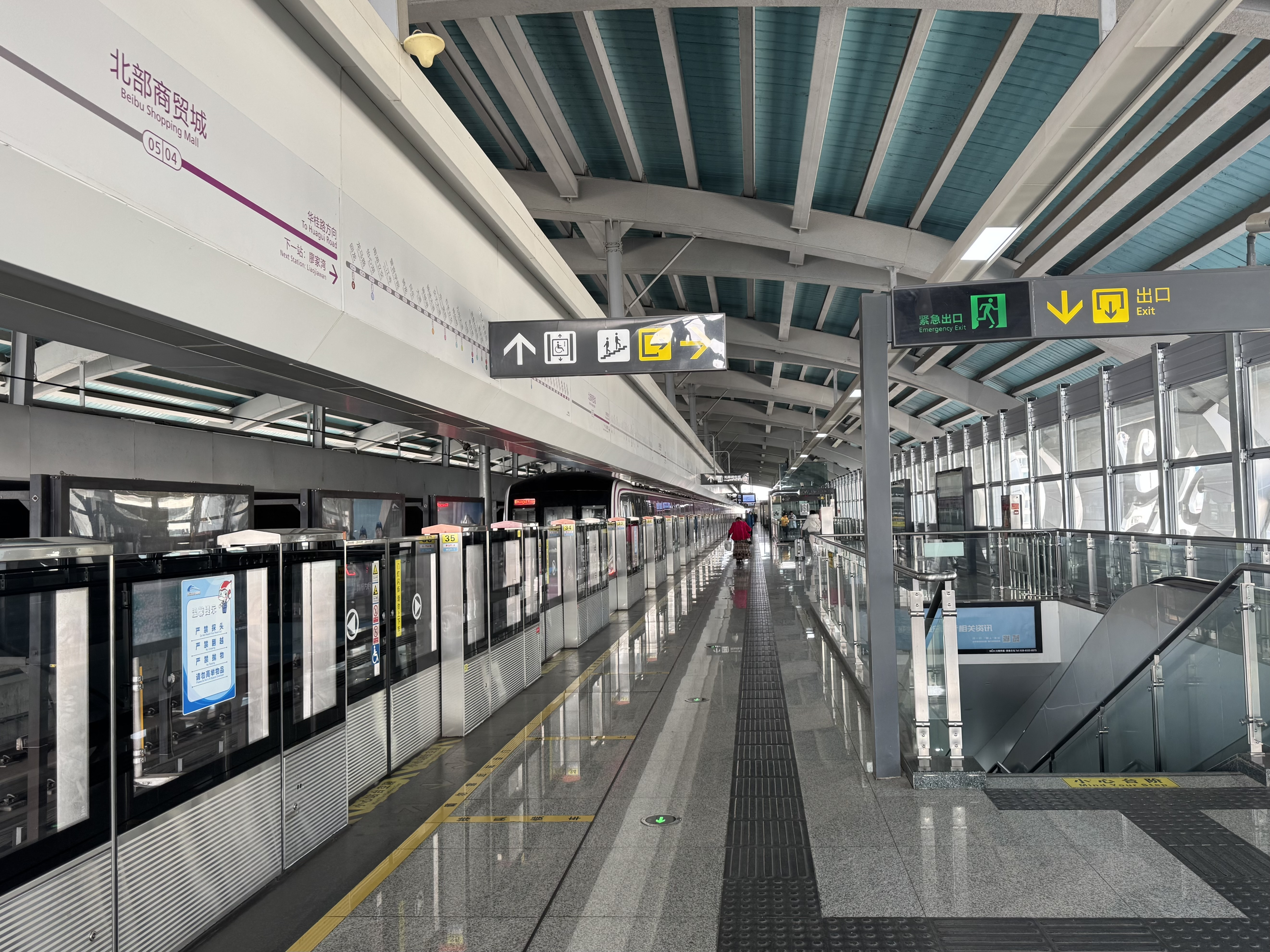

General information
- Location: Jinniu District, Chengdu, Sichuan; China
- Coordinates: 30.79344°N 104.08653°E
- Operated by: Chengdu Metro Limited
- Line: Line 5
- Platforms: 2 (2 side platforms)

Other information
- Station code: 0504

History
- Opened: 27 December 2019

Services
Preceding station	Chengdu Metro	Following station
Liaojiawan towards Huagui Road	Line 5	Xingfuqiao towards Huilong
Location

Beibu Shopping Mall (Chinese: 北部商贸城) is a station on Line 5 of the Chengdu Metro in China. It was opened on 27 December 2019.

== Gallery ==
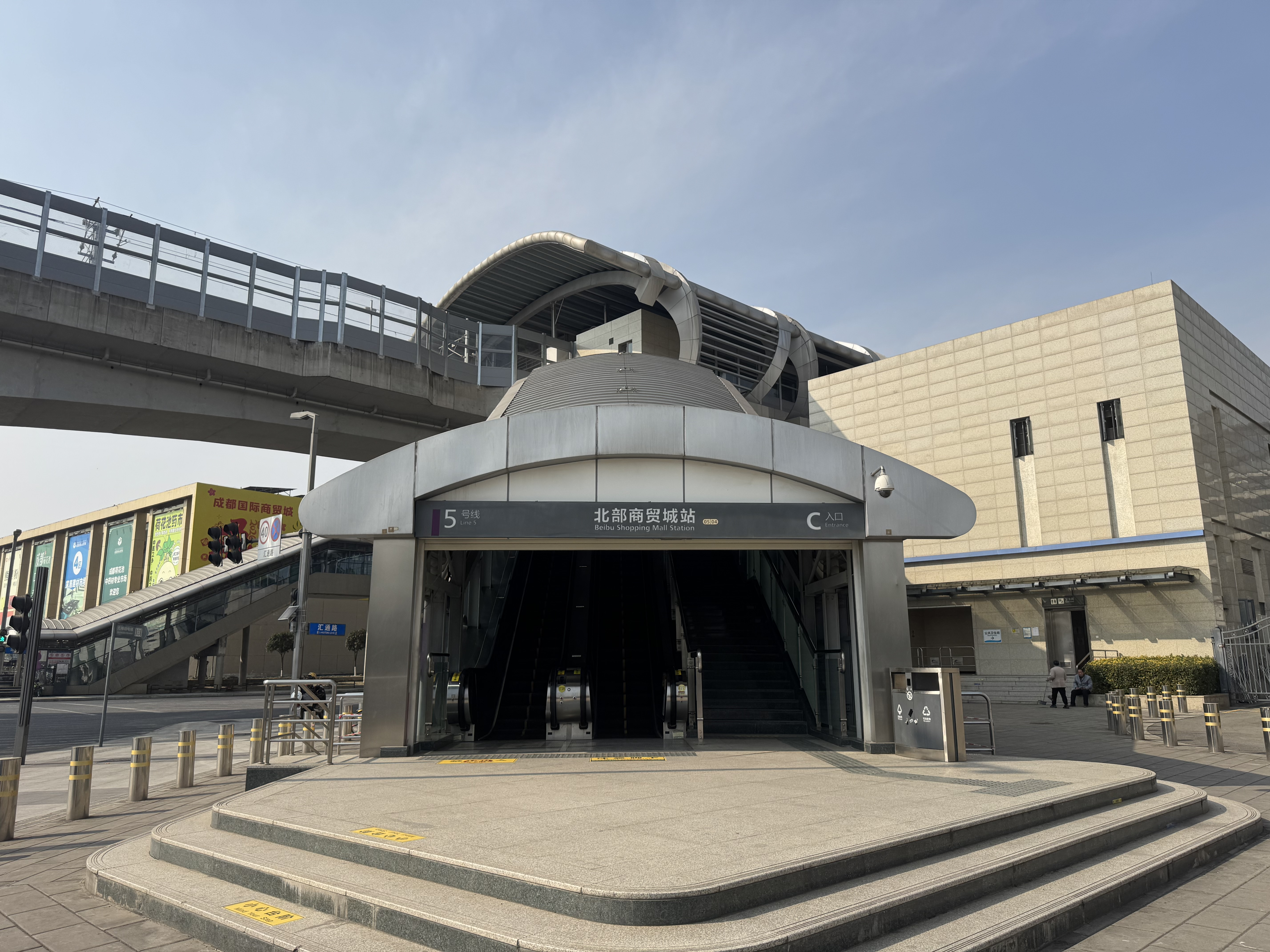
Exit C
