= Fuqin station =

Metro station in Chengdu, China

Fuqin 抚琴
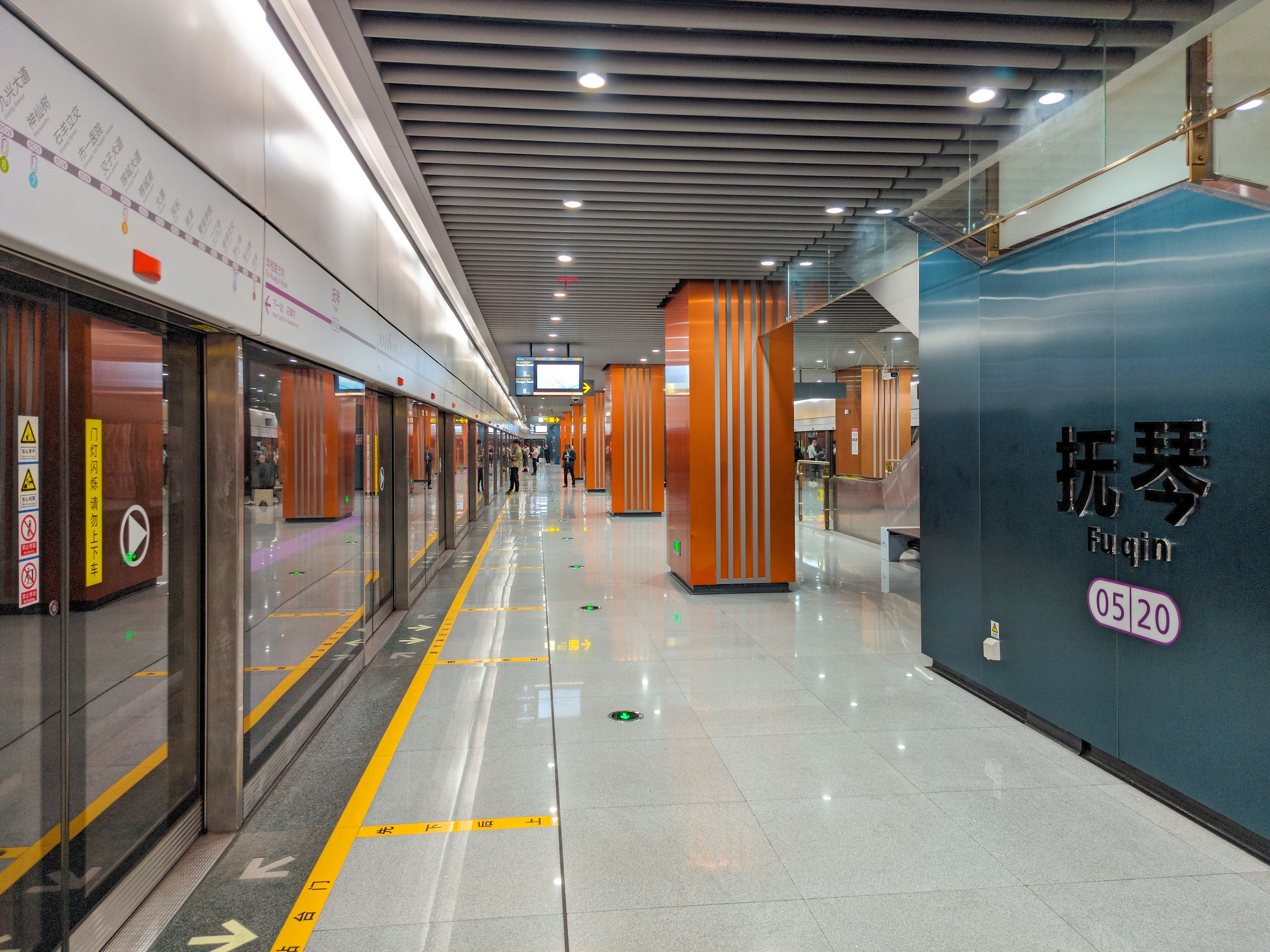

General information
- Location: Jinniu District, Chengdu, Sichuan; China
- Operated by: Chengdu Metro Limited
- Line: Line 5
- Platforms: 2 (1 island platform)

Other information
- Station code: 0520

History
- Opened: 27 December 2019

Services
Preceding station	Chengdu Metro	Following station
Huapaifang towards Huagui Road	Line 5	Chengdu University of TCM & Sichuan Provincial People's Hospital towards Huilong
Location

Fuqin (Chinese: 抚琴) is a station on Line 5 of the Chengdu Metro in China. It was opened on 27 December 2019.

== Gallery ==
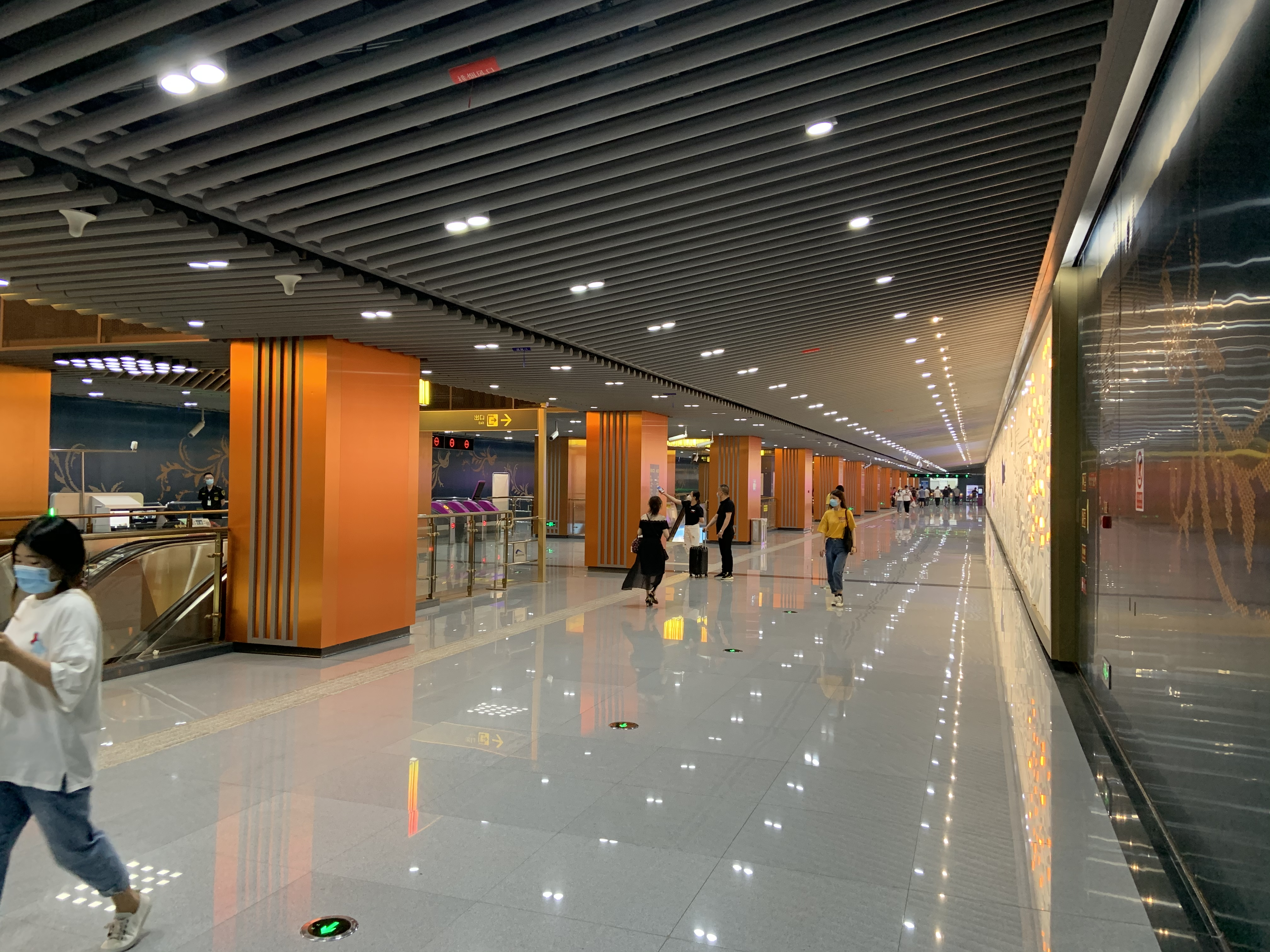
Concourse

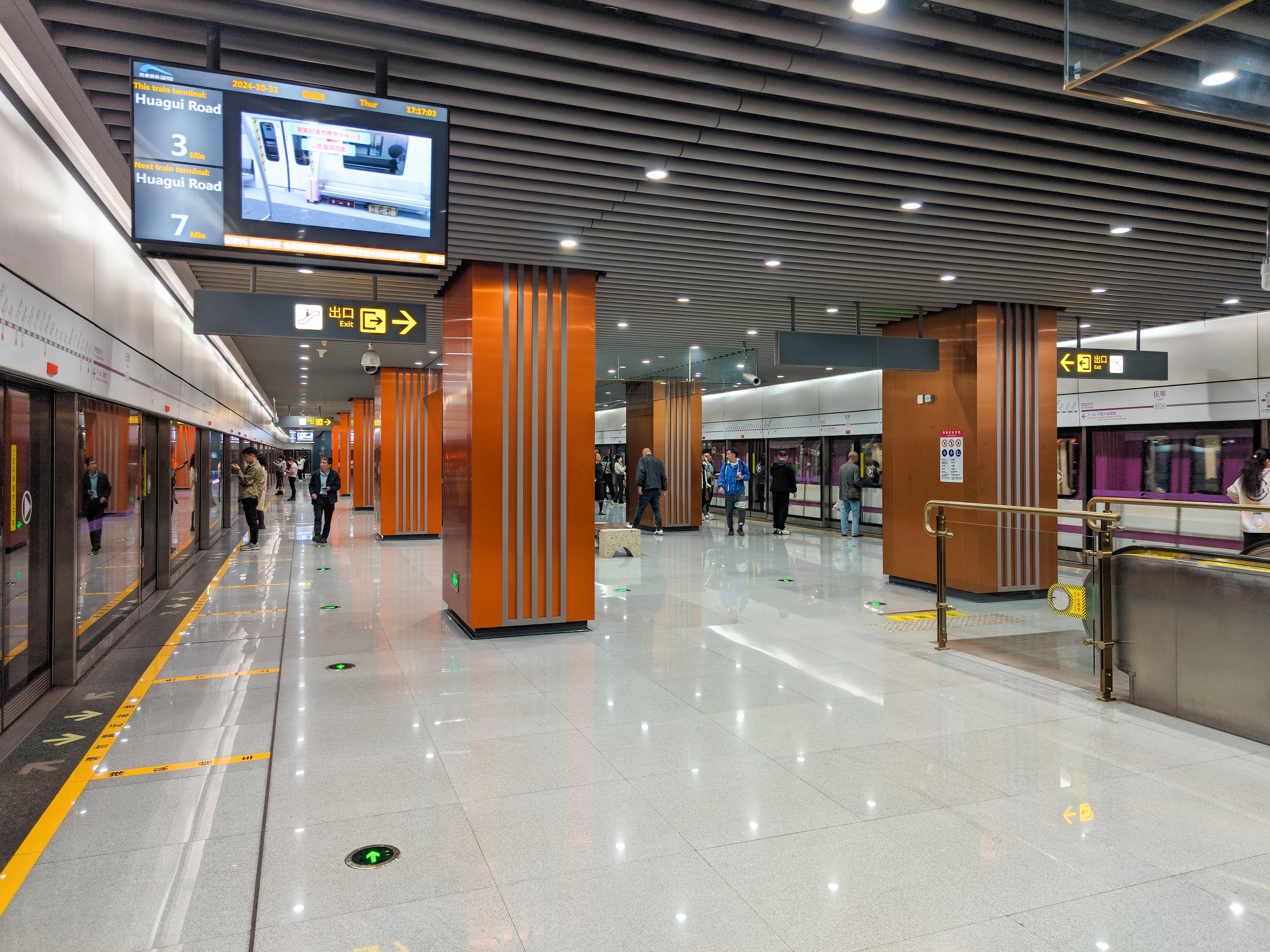
Platform
