= Jiudaoyan station =

Metro station in Chengdu, China

Jiudaoyan 九道堰
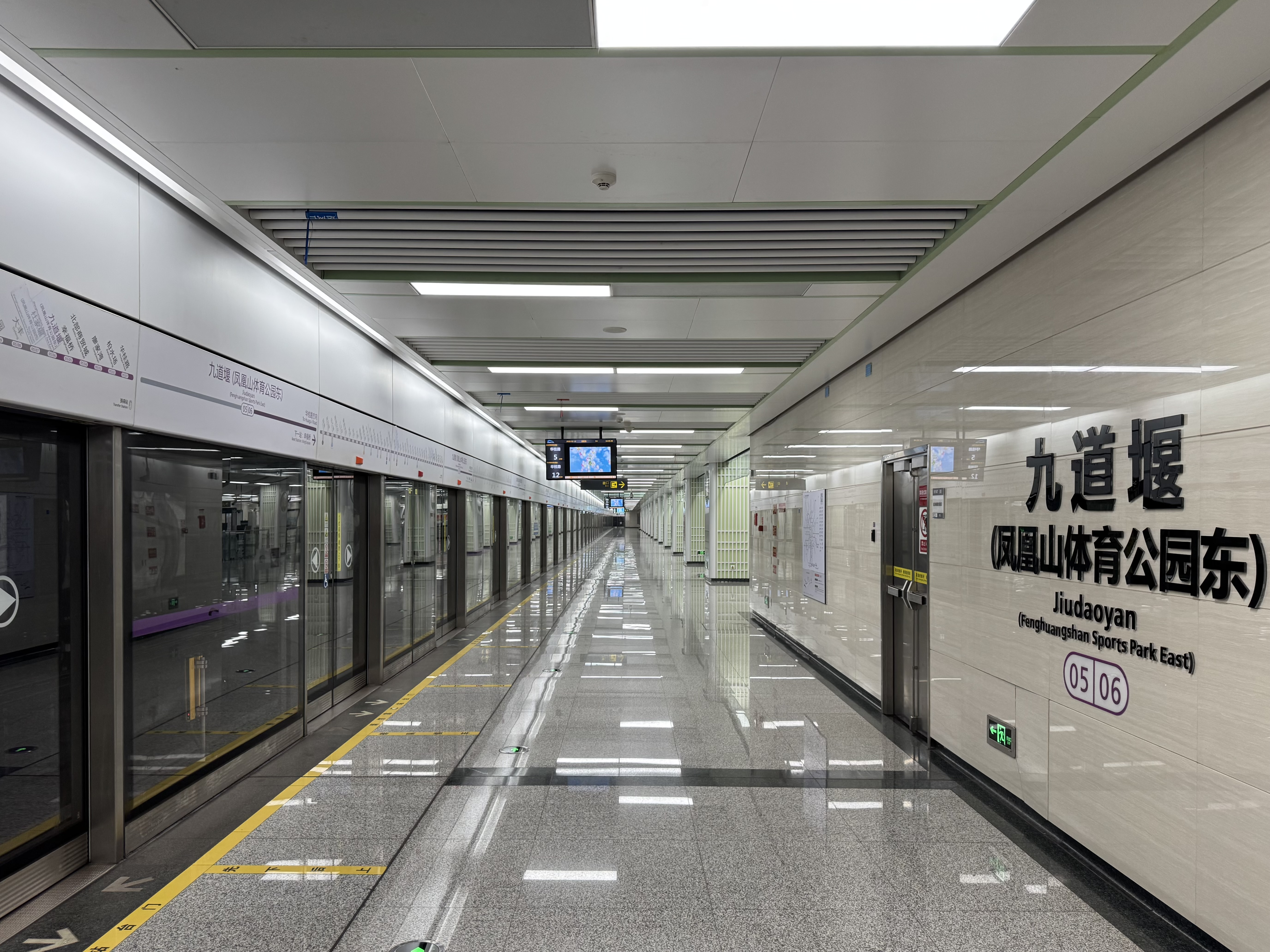

General information
- Location: Jinniu District, Chengdu, Sichuan; China
- Operated by: Chengdu Metro Limited
- Line: Line 5
- Platforms: 2 (2 side platforms)

Other information
- Station code: 0506

History
- Opened: 27 December 2019

Services
Preceding station	Chengdu Metro	Following station
Xingfuqiao towards Huagui Road	Line 5	Dujianian towards Huilong
Location

Jiudaoyan (Chinese: 九道堰) is a station on Line 5 of the Chengdu Metro in China. It was opened on 27 December 2019.
