= Liaojiawan station =

Metro station in Chengdu, China

Liaojiawan 廖家湾

General information
- Location: Xindu District, Chengdu, Sichuan; China
- Operated by: Chengdu Metro Limited
- Line: Line 5
- Platforms: 2 (2 side platforms)

Other information
- Station code: 0503

History
- Opened: 27 December 2019; 6 years ago

Services
Preceding station	Chengdu Metro	Following station
Baishuichang towards Huagui Road	Line 5	Beibu Shopping Mall towards Huilong
Location

Liaojiawan (Chinese: 廖家湾) is a station on Line 5 of the Chengdu Metro in China. It was opened on 27 December 2019.
