= Dafeng station =

Metro station in Chengdu, China

Dafeng 大丰

General information
- Location: Xindu District, Chengdu, Sichuan; China
- Coordinates: 30.77397°N 104.06449°E
- Operated by: Chengdu Metro Limited
- Line(s): Line 5
- Platforms: 2 (1 island platform)

Other information
- Station code: 0508

History
- Opened: 27 December 2019

Services
Preceding station	Chengdu Metro	Following station
Dujianian towards Huagui Road	Line 5	Shixi Park towards Huilong

Dafeng (Chinese: 大丰) is a station on Line 5 of the Chengdu Metro in China. It was opened on 27 December 2019.
