= Jincheng Lake station =

Metro station in Chengdu, China

Jincheng Lake 锦城湖

General information
- Location: High-Tech Zone, Chengdu, Sichuan; China
- Coordinates: 30.5669°N 104.0440°E
- Operated by: Chengdu Metro Limited
- Line: Line 5
- Platforms: 2 (1 island platform)

Construction
- Structure type: Underground

Other information
- Station code: 0532

History
- Opened: 27 December 2019

Services
Preceding station	Chengdu Metro	Following station
Jincheng Avenue towards Huagui Road	Line 5	Dayuan towards Huilong
Location

Jincheng Lake (Chinese: 锦城湖) is a station on Line 5 of the Chengdu Metro in China. It was opened on 27 December 2019.

== Station structure ==
The station is a two-level underground station with a single island platform.
