= Shixi Park station =

Metro station in Chengdu, China

Shixi Park 石犀公园

General information
- Location: Xindu District, Chengdu, Sichuan; China
- Operated by: Chengdu Metro Limited
- Line: Line 5
- Platforms: 2 (1 island platform)

Other information
- Station code: 0509

History
- Opened: 27 December 2019

Services
Preceding station	Chengdu Metro	Following station
Dafeng towards Huagui Road	Line 5	Huanghuayuan towards Huilong
Location

Shixi Park (Chinese: 石犀公园) is a station on Line 5 of the Chengdu Metro in China. It was opened on 27 December 2019.
