= Baishuichang station =

Metro station in Chengdu, China

Baishuichang 柏水场
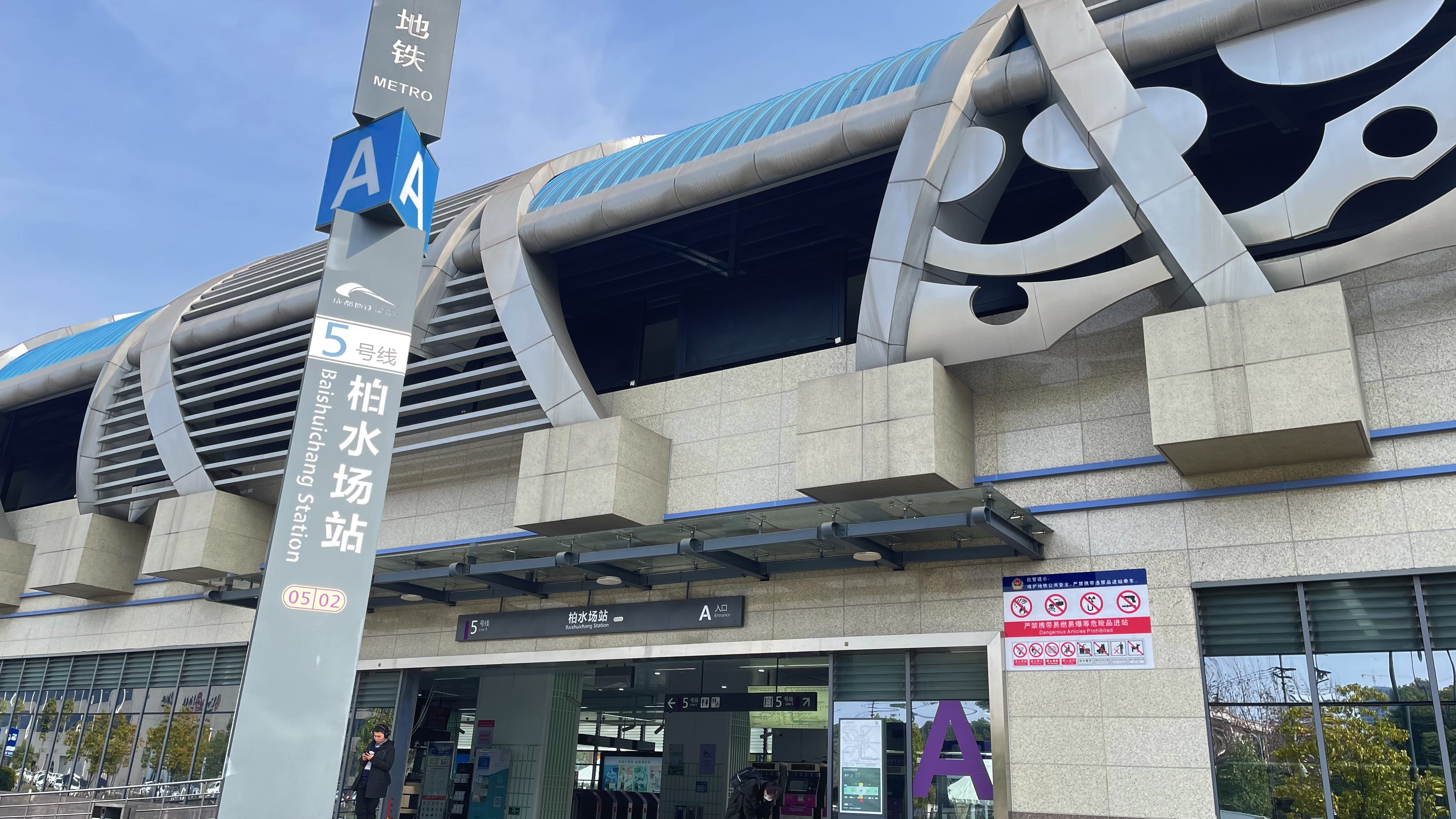

General information
- Location: Xindu District, Chengdu, Sichuan; China
- Coordinates: 30.81784°N 104.09179°E
- Operated by: Chengdu Metro Limited
- Line(s): Line 5
- Platforms: 2 (1 island platform)

Other information
- Station code: 0502

History
- Opened: 27 December 2019

Services
Preceding station	Chengdu Metro	Following station
Huagui Road Terminus	Line 5	Liaojiawan towards Huilong

Baishuichang (Chinese: 柏水场) is a station on Line 5 of the Chengdu Metro in China. It was opened on 27 December 2019.
