= Keyuan station (Chengdu Metro) =

Subway station in China

Keyuan 科园

General information
- Location: High-Tech Zone, Chengdu, Sichuan; China
- Operated by: Chengdu Metro Limited
- Line: Line 5
- Platforms: 2 (1 island platform)

Other information
- Station code: 0525

History
- Opened: 27 December 2019

Services
Preceding station	Chengdu Metro	Following station
Gaoshengqiao towards Huagui Road	Line 5	Jiuxing Avenue towards Huilong
Location

Keyuan (Chinese: 科园) is a station on Line 5 of the Chengdu Metro in China. It was opened on 27 December 2019.
