= Longma Road station =

Metro station in Chengdu, China

Longma Road 龙马路

General information
- Location: Tianfu New Area, Chengdu, Sichuan; China
- Operated by: Chengdu Metro Limited
- Line: Line 5
- Platforms: 2 (1 island platform)

Other information
- Station code: 0540

History
- Opened: 27 December 2019

Services
Preceding station	Chengdu Metro	Following station
Yixin Lake towards Huagui Road	Line 5	Huilong Terminus
Location

Longma Road (Chinese: 龙马路) is a station on Line 5 of the Chengdu Metro in China. It was opened on 27 December 2019.
