= Line 5 (Chengdu Metro) =

Metro line in Chengdu, China

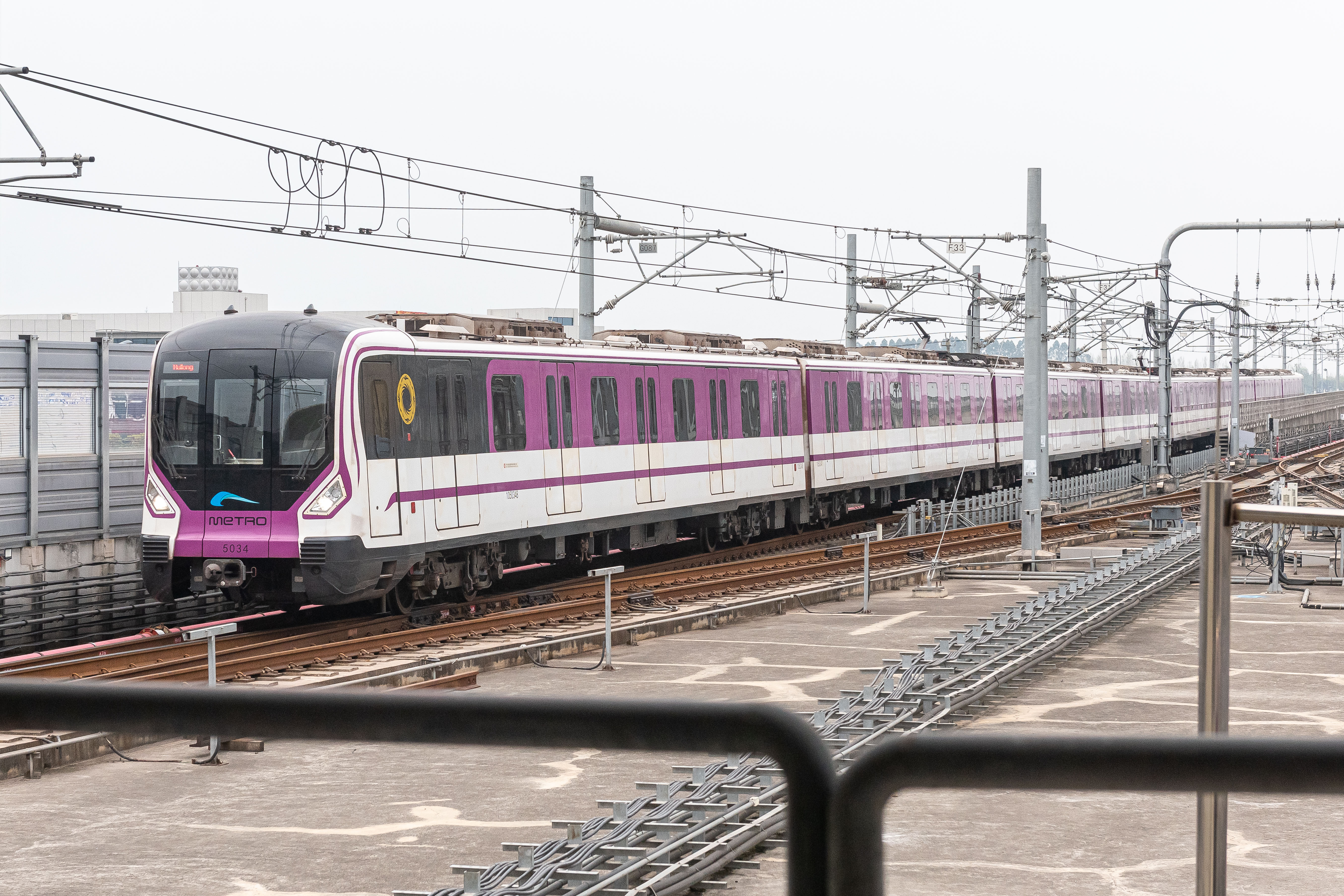
- A Line 5 train entering at Baishuichang station

Overview
- Status: In operation
- Owner: City of Chengdu
- Locale: Chengdu, Sichuan
- Termini: Huagui Road; Huilong
- Stations: 48

Service
- Type: Rapid transit
- System: Chengdu Metro
- Services: 2
- Operator(s): Chengdu Metro Corporation
- Depot(s): Huagui Road Depot
- Rolling stock: 8-car Type A

History
- Opened: 27 December 2019; 6 years ago

Technical
- Line length: 49.01 km (30.5 mi)
- Number of tracks: 2
- Character: Underground and Elevated
- Track gauge: 1,435 mm (4 ft 8 1/2 in)
- Electrification: Overhead lines, 1,500 V DC
- Operating speed: 80 km/h (50 mph)

Line 5 of the Chengdu Metro (Chinese: 成都地铁5号线; pinyin: Chéngdū Dìtiě Wǔ Hào Xiàn) is a rapid transit line in Chengdu. It starts at Huagui Road and ends at Huilong. The total length is 49.01 km (30.5 mi).

Line 5's color is purple. This line began construction on 14 September 2015, was opened on 27 December 2019, from Huagui Road to Huilong.

Originally, the line was planned to use 6-car Type A rolling stock. However, anticipating high demand as the line will provide relief for the older Line 1 and connect several important business and residential areas, the line was redesigned to allow for expansion to use 8-car Type A rolling stock. This will allow for an ultimate configuration of the line to reach capacities of 64,300 people per hour per direction.

== Progress ==
- 2015
  - July 6, Phase 1 & 2 are officially approved.
  - In August, all stations started construction.
- 2016
  - August 18, first tunnel boring machine started tunneling between Jiudaoyan and Dujianian.
  - November 3, first tunnel section is finished.
  - November 4, to accommodate the projected high demand, Line 5 was redesigned from supporting 6-car A-Type trains to 8-car A-Type trains.
  - November 12, Dujianian topped out, being the first station on the line to do so.
- 2017
  - May 25, Keyuan to Gaoshengqiao is the first to finish all tunnel work.
  - December 5, Phase 1 & 2 begins track-laying.
- 2018
  - April 17, first trainbody was completed by CRRC Chengdu. It is the first A-type train for Chengdu Metro.
  - September 9, tunnel construction is finished.
  - November 10, first train for Dafeng Depot arrived.
  - November 22, elevated sections finished sound barrier work.
  - December 11, Elevated sections finished power-off testing from Huagui Road to Xingfuqiao.
  - December 15, Elevated sections and Dafeng Depot finished testing.
  - December 28, Phase 1 & 2 finished track-laying.
- 2019
  - October 30, 41 stations are fully functional and finished station testing; all stations are now operating by Chengdu Metro Company.
  - November 22, all escalators passed government assessment.
  - December 9, Phase 1 & 2 passed safety assessment.
  - December 25, Chengdu Metro officially announced Line 5's opening date scheduled for December 27 is the opening time.
  - December 27, Phase 1 & 2 started public operation.
- 2020
  - August 8, Line 5 trains will have different air conditioning settings in each car. Riders can choose between the center four cars which are set to 27 degrees or the two cars on each end which are set to 25 degrees.
- 2022
  - On 16 February 2020, in order to fix the noise issue of Line 5, Xingfuqiao to Beibu Shopping Mall to Liaojiawan sections now limits operational speed of 60 km/h on average, minimizing the noise to environment and neighbourhoods.

== Timeline ==
Segment	Commencement	Length	Station(s)	Name
Huagui Road — Huilong	27 December 2019	49.01 km (30.5 mi)	41	Phase 1 & 2

== Stations ==
Service routes		Station No.	Station name		Transfer	Distance km		Location
Service routes		Station No.	English	Chinese	Transfer	Distance km		Location
●		0501	Huagui Road	华桂路		-	0.000	Xindu
●		0502	Baishuichang	柏水场		1.139	1.139	Xindu
●		0503	Liaojiawan	廖家湾		0.856	1.995	Xindu
●		0504	Beibu Shopping Mall	北部商贸城		1.983	3.978	Jinniu
●		0505	Xingfuqiao	幸福桥		1.582	5.560	Jinniu
●		0506	Jiudaoyan	九道堰		0.932	6.492	Jinniu
●		0507	Dujianian	杜家碾	S11	0.766	7.258	Jinniu
●		0508	Dafeng	大丰		0.848	8.106	Xindu
●	●	0509	Shixi Park	石犀公园		1.711	9.817	Xindu
●	●	0510	Huanghuayuan	皇花园		0.816	10.633	Xindu
●	●	0511	Lujiaqiao	陆家桥		1.123	11.756	Jinniu
●	●	0512	Quanshui Road	泉水路		1.299	13.055	Jinniu
●	●	0513	Dongzikou	洞子口	27	1.038	14.093	Jinniu
●	●	0514	Funing Road	福宁路		0.769	14.862	Jinniu
●	●	0515	Wukuaishi	五块石		0.921	15.783	Jinniu
●	●	0516	Saiyuntai	赛云台		0.765	16.548	Jinniu
●	●	0517	2nd Beizhan West Road	北站西二路	7 Chengdu BRT	0.775	17.323	Jinniu
●	●	0518	Xibei Bridge	西北桥	6	1.499	18.822	Jinniu
●	●	0519	Huapaifang	花牌坊		0.906	19.728	Jinniu
●	●	0520	Fuqin	抚琴		0.998	20.726	Jinniu
●	●	0521	Chengdu University of TCM & Sichuan Provincial People's Hospital	中医大·省医院	2 4	1.293	22.019	Qingyang
●	●	0522	Qingyang Taoist Temple	青羊宫	13	0.676	22.695	Qingyang
●	●	0523	Provincial Orthopaedics Hospital	省骨科医院	17	0.915	23.610	Qingyang
●	●	0524	Gaoshengqiao	高升桥	3 10	1.358	24.968	Wuhou
●	●	0525	Keyuan	科园		1.400	26.368	High-Tech Zone
●	●	0526	Jiuxing Avenue	九兴大道	8	0.959	27.327	High-Tech Zone
●	●	0527	Shenxianshu	神仙树	7 Chengdu BRT	1.599	28.926	High-Tech Zone
●	●	0528	Shiyang Flyover	石羊立交		1.811	30.737	High-Tech Zone
●	●	0529	Chengdu First People's Hospital	市一医院	30	0.662	31.399	High-Tech Zone
●	●	0530	Jiaozi Avenue	交子大道		0.851	32.250	High-Tech Zone
●	●	0531	Jincheng Avenue	锦城大道	9	0.858	33.108	High-Tech Zone
●	●	0532	Jincheng Lake	锦城湖		1.334	34.442	High-Tech Zone
●	●	0533	Dayuan	大源		1.503	35.945	High-Tech Zone
●	●	0534	Minle	民乐		1.027	36.972	High-Tech Zone
●	●	0535	Qilong	骑龙		1.722	38.694	Tianfu New Area
●	●	0536	The Police College	警官学院		1.449	40.143	Tianfu New Area
●	●	0537	Erjiang Temple	二江寺		1.479	41.622	Tianfu New Area
●		0538	Nanhu Flyover	南湖立交		1.292	42.914	Tianfu New Area
●		0539	Yixin Lake	怡心湖	19	2.034	44.948	Tianfu New Area
●		0540	Longma Road	龙马路		1.649	46.597	Tianfu New Area
●		0541	Huilong	回龙	6	1.605	48.202	Tianfu New Area

== See also ==
- Chengdu Metro
- Urban rail transit in China
- Line 6, Chengdu Metro
