= Chengdu Longquanyi railway station =

Railway station in Chengdu, China

Chengdu Longquanyi 成都龙泉驿

General information
- Location: Longquanyi District, Chengdu, Sichuan; China
- Coordinates: 30.597462°N 104.191514°E
- Operator: China Railway Chengdu Railway Bureau
- Platforms: 7 (3 island platforms, 1 side platform)
- Tracks: 9
- Connections: 2 Longquanyi Railway Station 30 Longquanyi Railway Station South

Other information
- Station code: TMIS code: 45966; Telegraph code: CEE; Pinyin code: CDY

History
- Opened: 30 October 2026
Location

Chengdu Longquanyi railway station (Chinese: 成都龙泉驿站; pinyin: Chéngdū Lóngquányì Zhàn) is a railway station located in Longquanyi District, Chengdu, the capital of Sichuan province. The station opened on 30 October 2026, with passenger train services beginning the following day.
