= Huilong station (Chengdu Metro) =

Metro station in Chengdu, China

Huilong 回龙
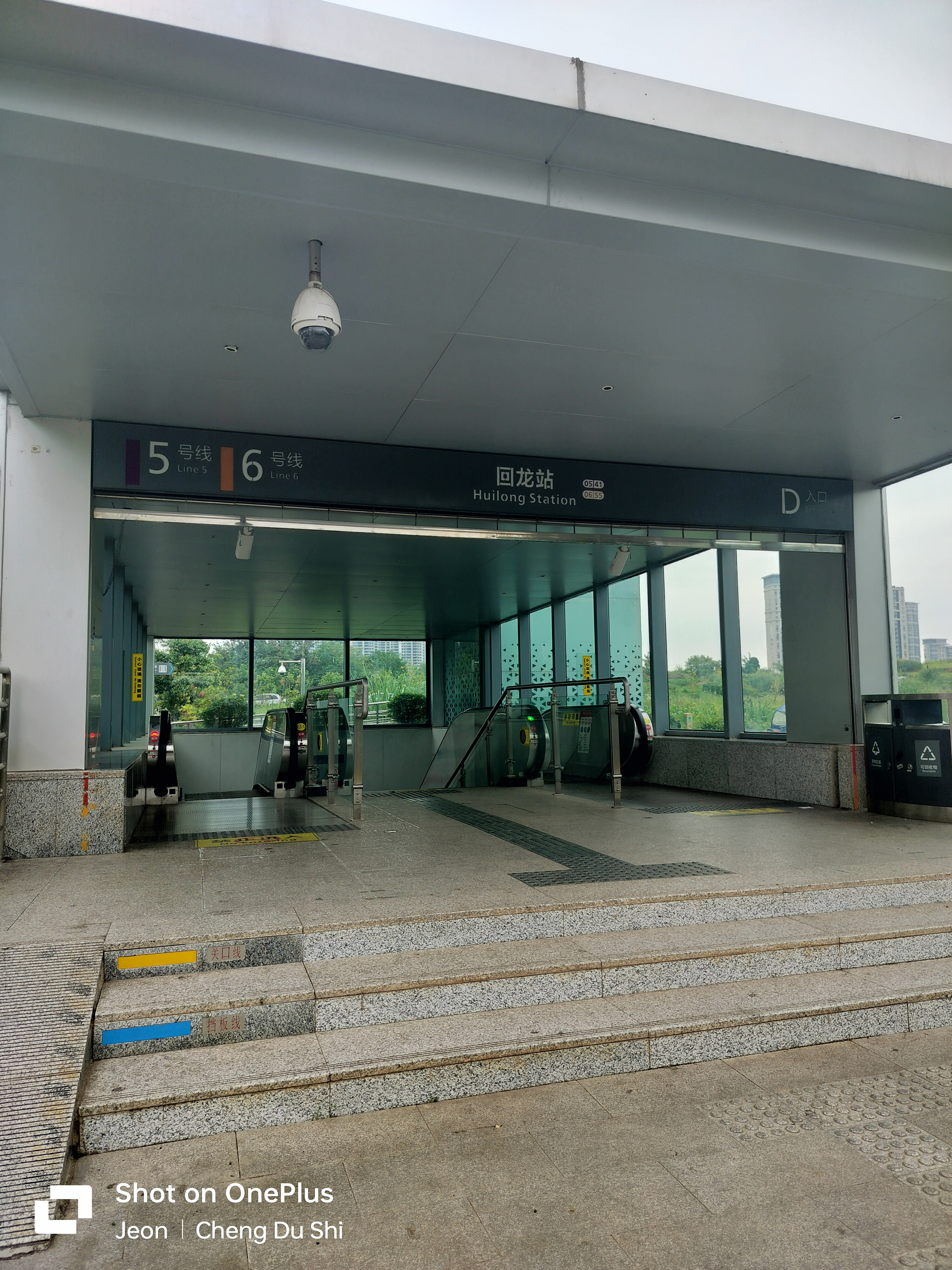
- Entrance D

General information
- Location: Tianfu New Area, Chengdu, Sichuan; China
- Coordinates: 30.4472°N 104.0097°E
- Operated by: Chengdu Metro Limited
- Lines: Line 5 Line 6
- Platforms: 4 (2 island platforms)

Other information
- Station code: 0541 0655

History
- Opened: 27 December 2019

Services
Preceding station	Chengdu Metro	Following station
Longma Road towards Huagui Road	Line 5	Terminus
Diaoyuzui towards Wangcong Temple	Line 6	Lanjiagou Terminus
Location

Huilong (Chinese: 回龙) is a station on Line 5 and Line 6 of the Chengdu Metro in China. It was opened on 27 December 2019 and it is the southern terminus of Line 5.
