= Huagui Road station =

Station on Line 5 of the Chengdu Metro, China

Huagui Road 华桂路
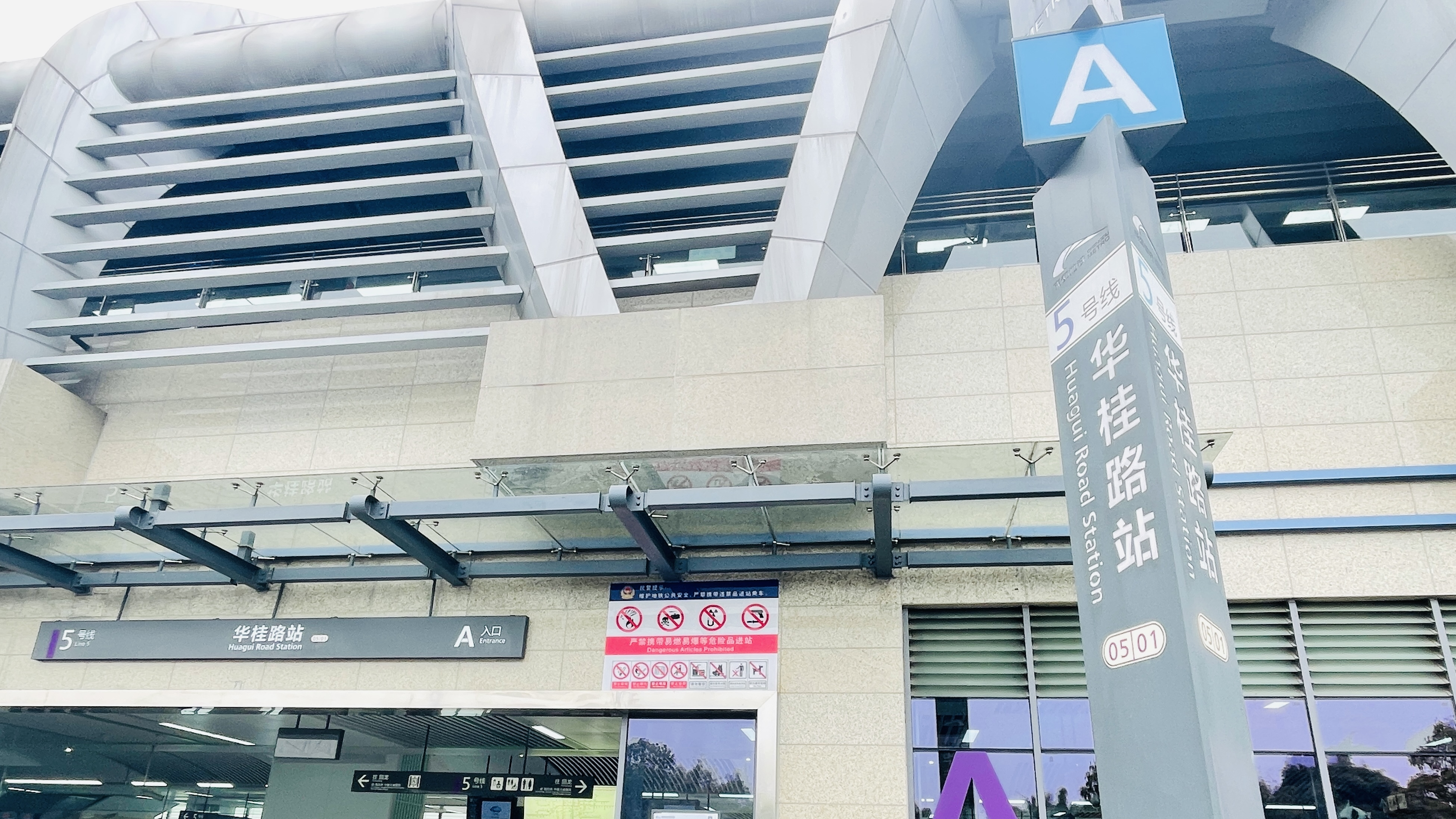
- Entrance A of Huagui Road Station

General information
- Location: Xindu District, Chengdu, Sichuan; China
- Coordinates: 30.8275°N 104.0959°E
- Operated by: Chengdu Metro Limited
- Line: Line 5
- Platforms: 2 (2 side platforms)

Other information
- Station code: 0501

History
- Opened: 27 December 2019

Services
Preceding station	Chengdu Metro	Following station
Terminus	Line 5	Baishuichang towards Huilong
Location

Huagui Road (Chinese: 华桂路) is a station on Line 5 of the Chengdu Metro in China. It was opened on 27 December 2019 and it is the northern terminus of Line 5.
