= Terminal 1 of Shuangliu International Airport station =

Metro station in Chengdu, China

Terminal 1 of Shuangliu International Airport 双流机场1航站楼
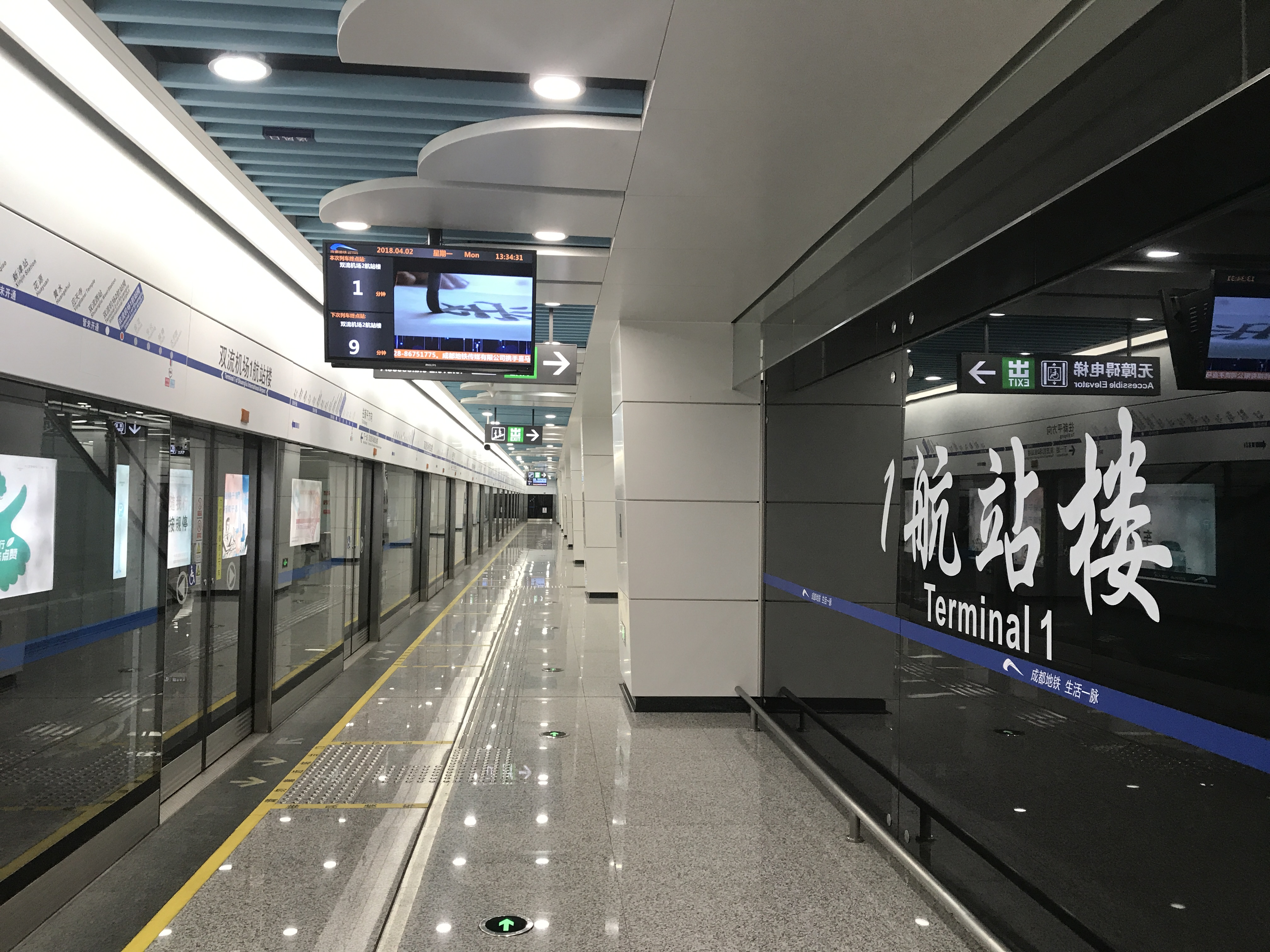

General information
- Location: Shuangliu District, Chengdu, Sichuan; China
- Operator: Chengdu Metro Limited
- Line: Line 10
- Platforms: 2 (1 island platform)

Other information
- Station code: 1011

History
- Opened: 6 September 2017

Services
Preceding station	Chengdu Metro	Following station
Jinhua towards Wuhou Shrine	Line 10	Terminal 2 of Shuangliu International Airport towards Xinping
Location

Terminal 1 of Shuangliu International Airport (Chinese: 双流机场1航站楼) is a station on Line 10 of the Chengdu Metro in China. It was opened on 6 September 2017. The station serves Terminal 1 of Chengdu Shuangliu International Airport.

== Station layout ==
G	Entrances and Exits	Exits A, C, D
B1	Concourse	Faregates, Station Agent
B2	Northbound	← Line 10 to Taipingyuan (Jinhua)
B2	Island platform, doors open on the left
B2	Southbound	Line 10 to Xinping (Terminal 2 of Shuangliu International Airport) →

== Gallery ==
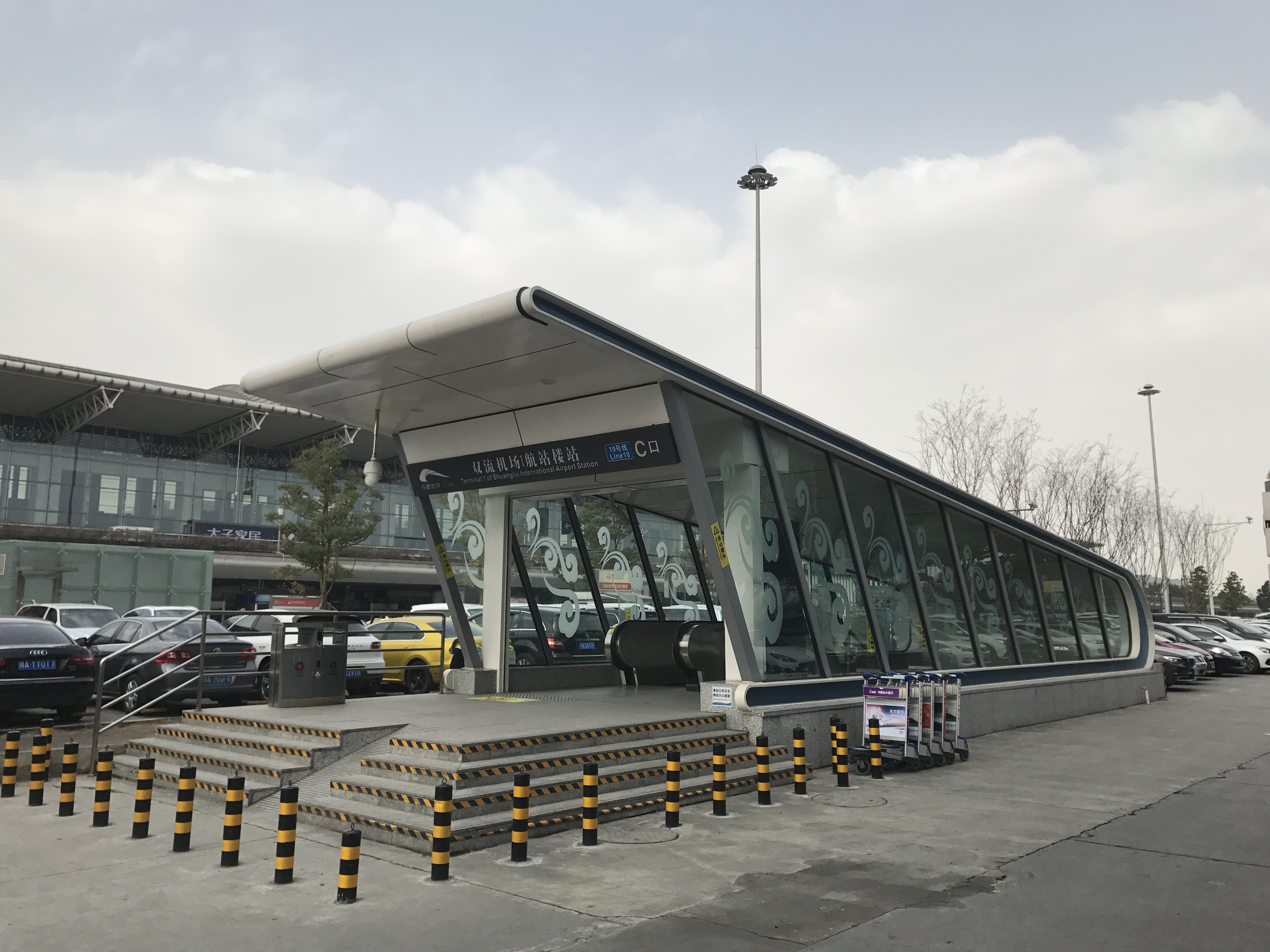
Entrance C

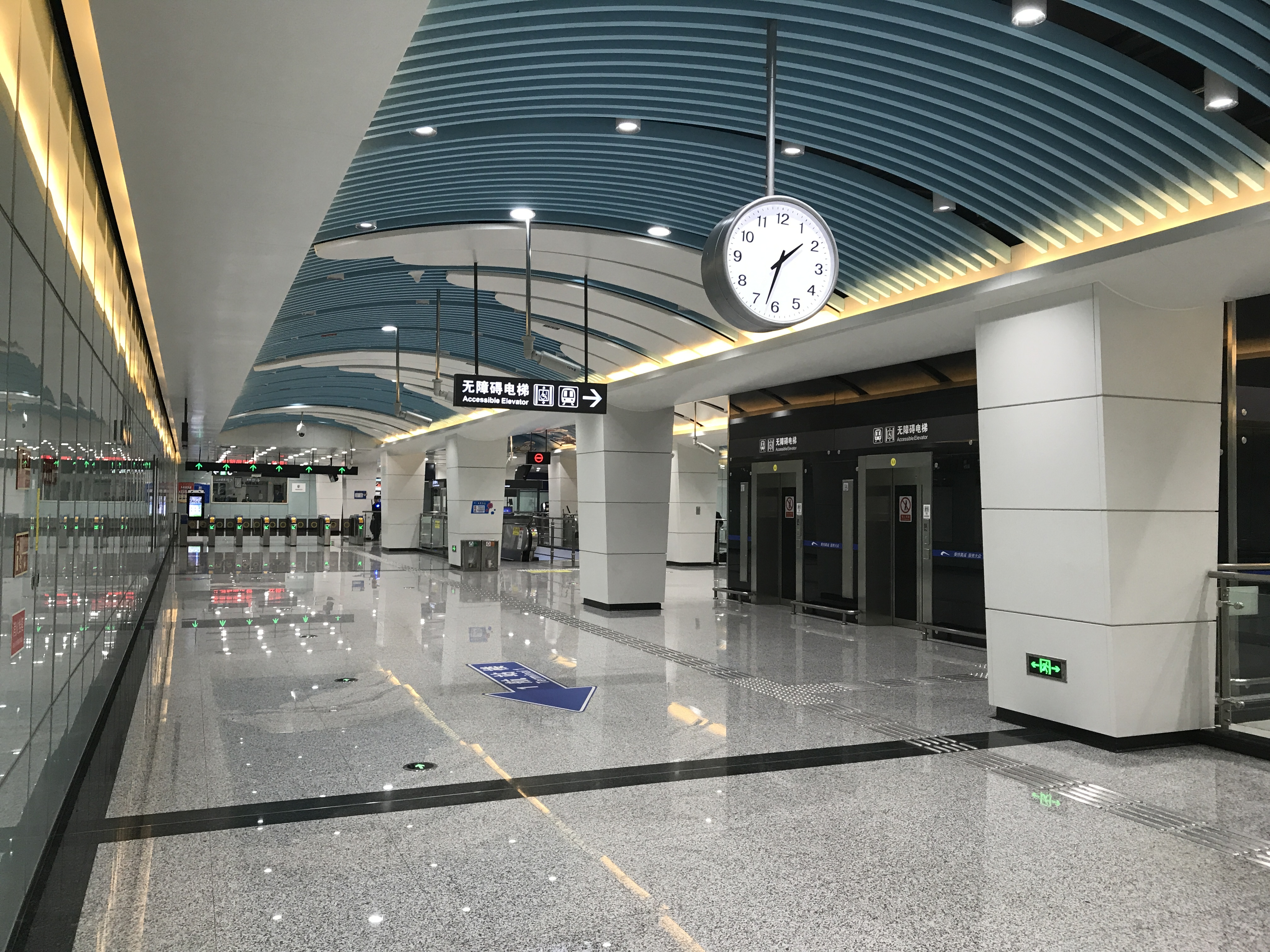
Concourse

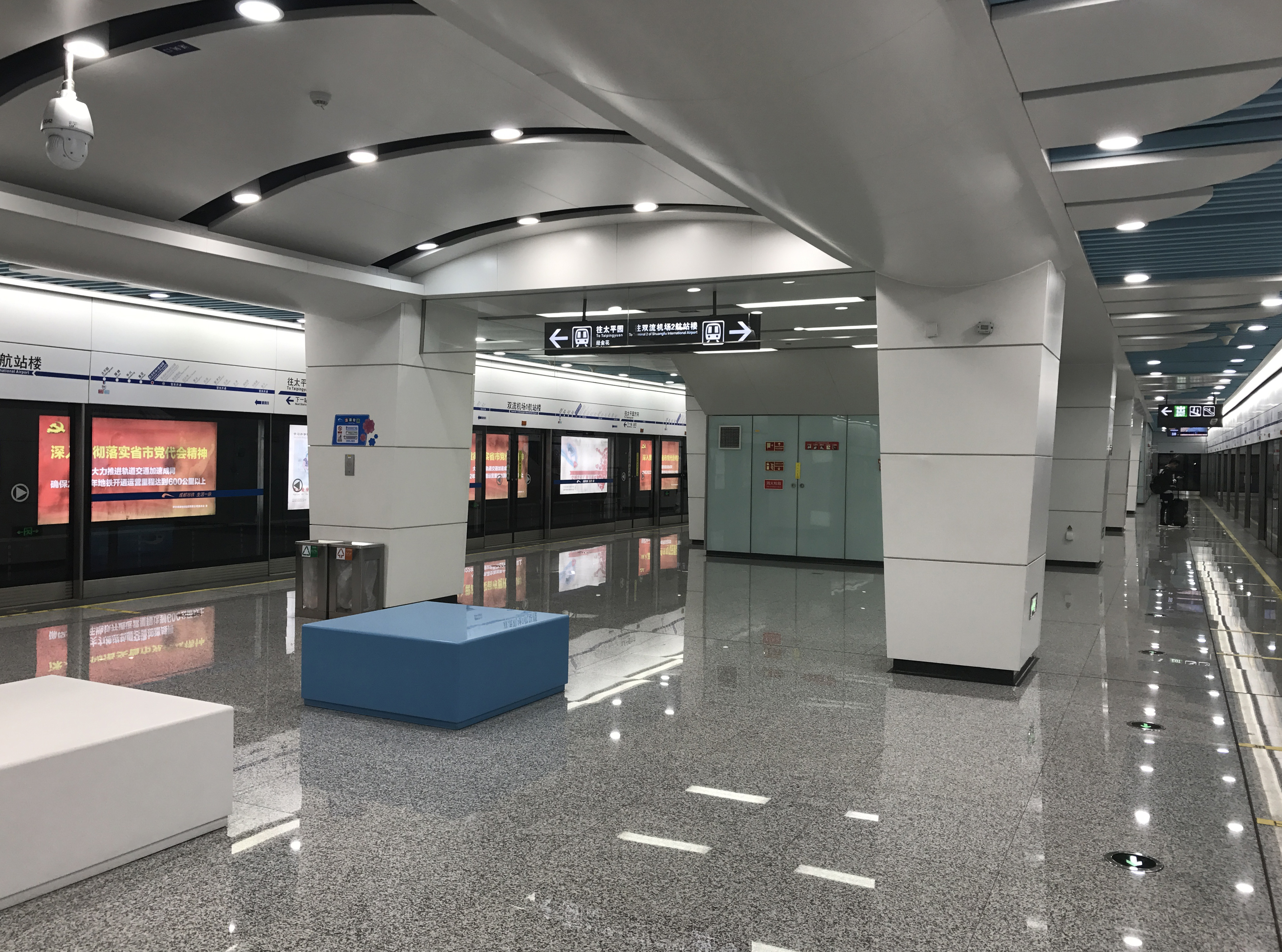
Platform
