= Terminal 2 of Shuangliu International Airport station =

Metro station in Chengdu, China

Terminal 2 of Shuangliu International Airport 双流机场2航站楼
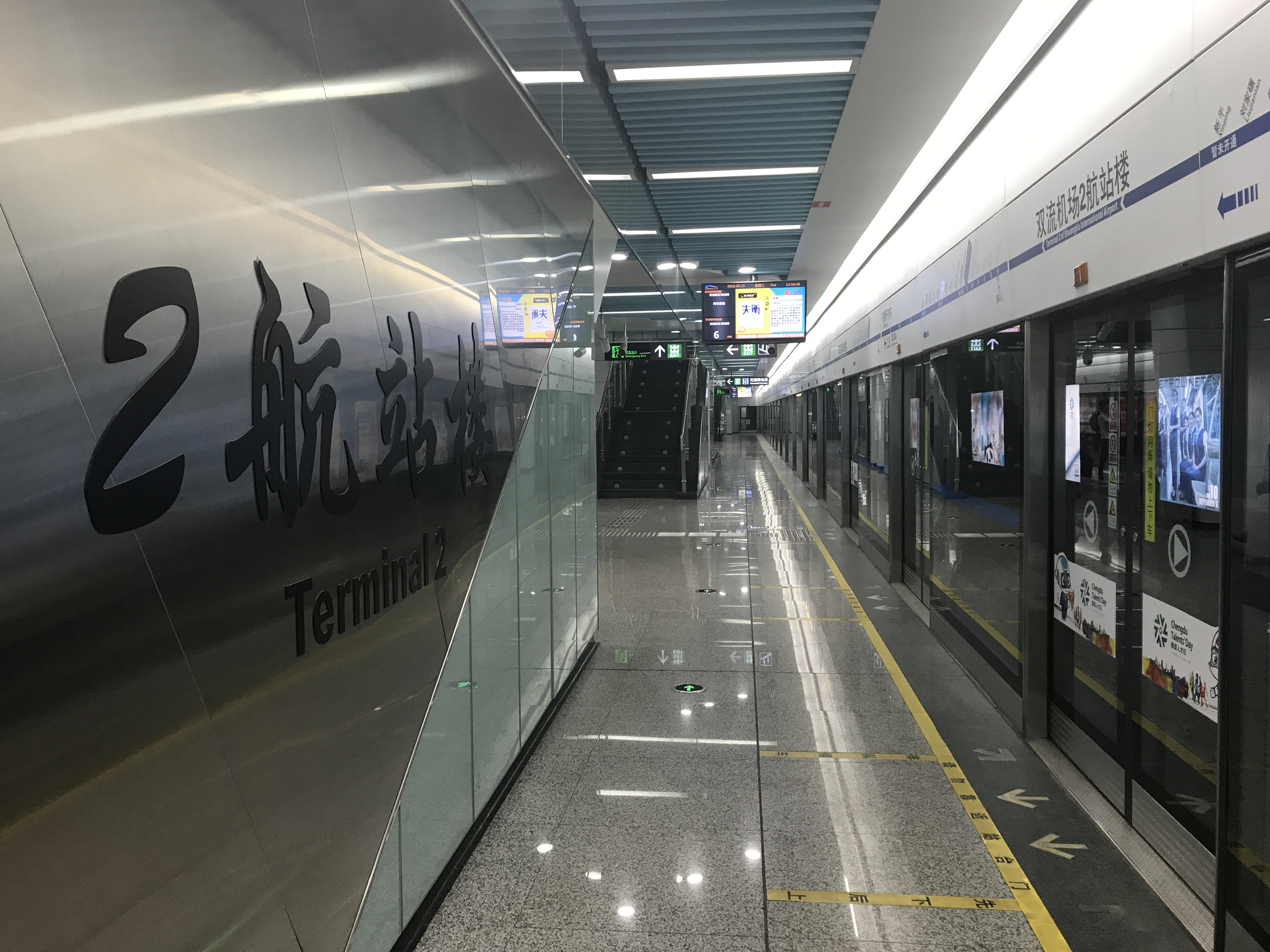

General information
- Location: Shuangliu District, Chengdu, Sichuan; China
- Coordinates: 30.57227°N 103.95409°E
- Operator: Chengdu Metro Limited
- Line: Line 10
- Platforms: 2 (1 island platform)
- Connections: Line 19, Line 30 (OSI with East of Terminal 2 of Shuangliu International Airport)

Other information
- Station code: 1012

History
- Opened: 6 September 2017

Services
Preceding station	Chengdu Metro	Following station
Terminal 1 of Shuangliu International Airport towards Wuhou Shrine	Line 10	Shuangliu West Railway Station towards Xinping
Location

Terminal 2 of Shuangliu International Airport (Chinese: 双流机场2航站楼) is a station on Line 10 of the Chengdu Metro in China. It was opened on 6 September 2017. The station serves Terminal 2 of Chengdu Shuangliu International Airport and connects to Shuangliu Airport railway station.

== Station layout ==
G	Entrances and Exits	Exits B, C, L
B1	Concourse	Faregates, Station Agent
B2	Northbound	← Line 10 to Taipingyuan (Terminal 1 of Shuangliu International Airport)
B2	Island platform, doors open on the left
B2	Southbound	Line 10 to Xinping (Shuangliu West Railway Station) →

== Gallery ==
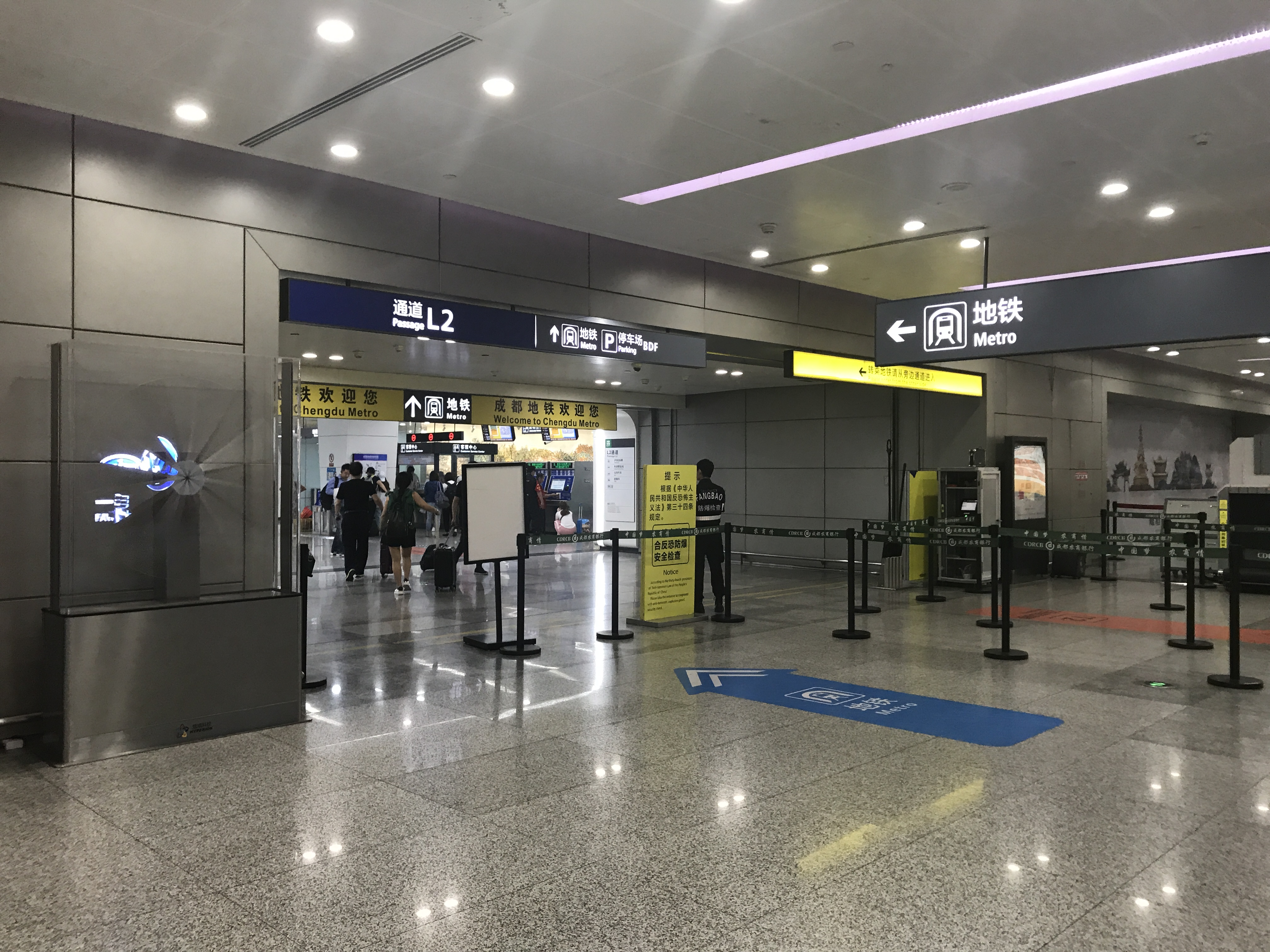
Entrance L2

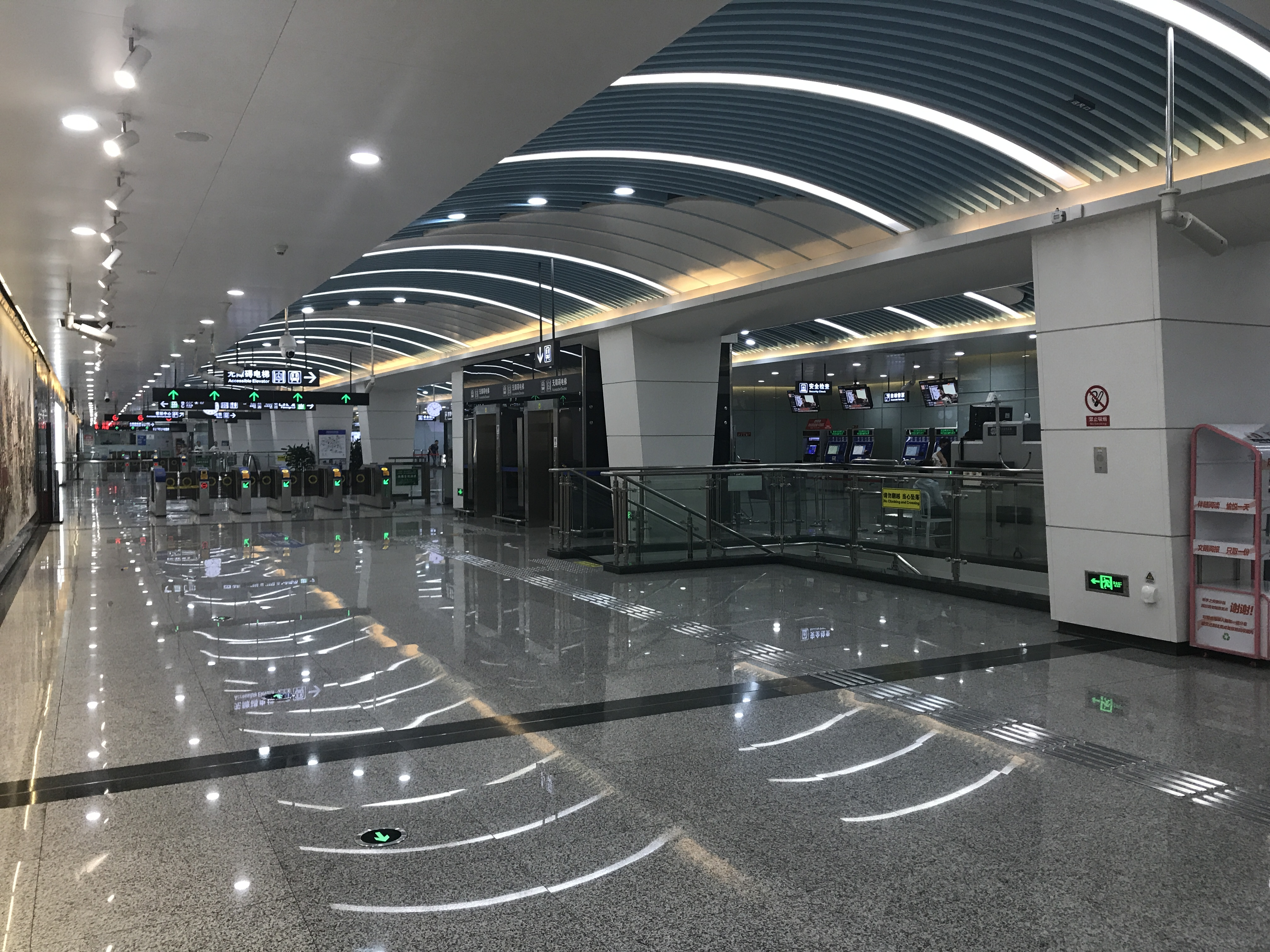
Concourse

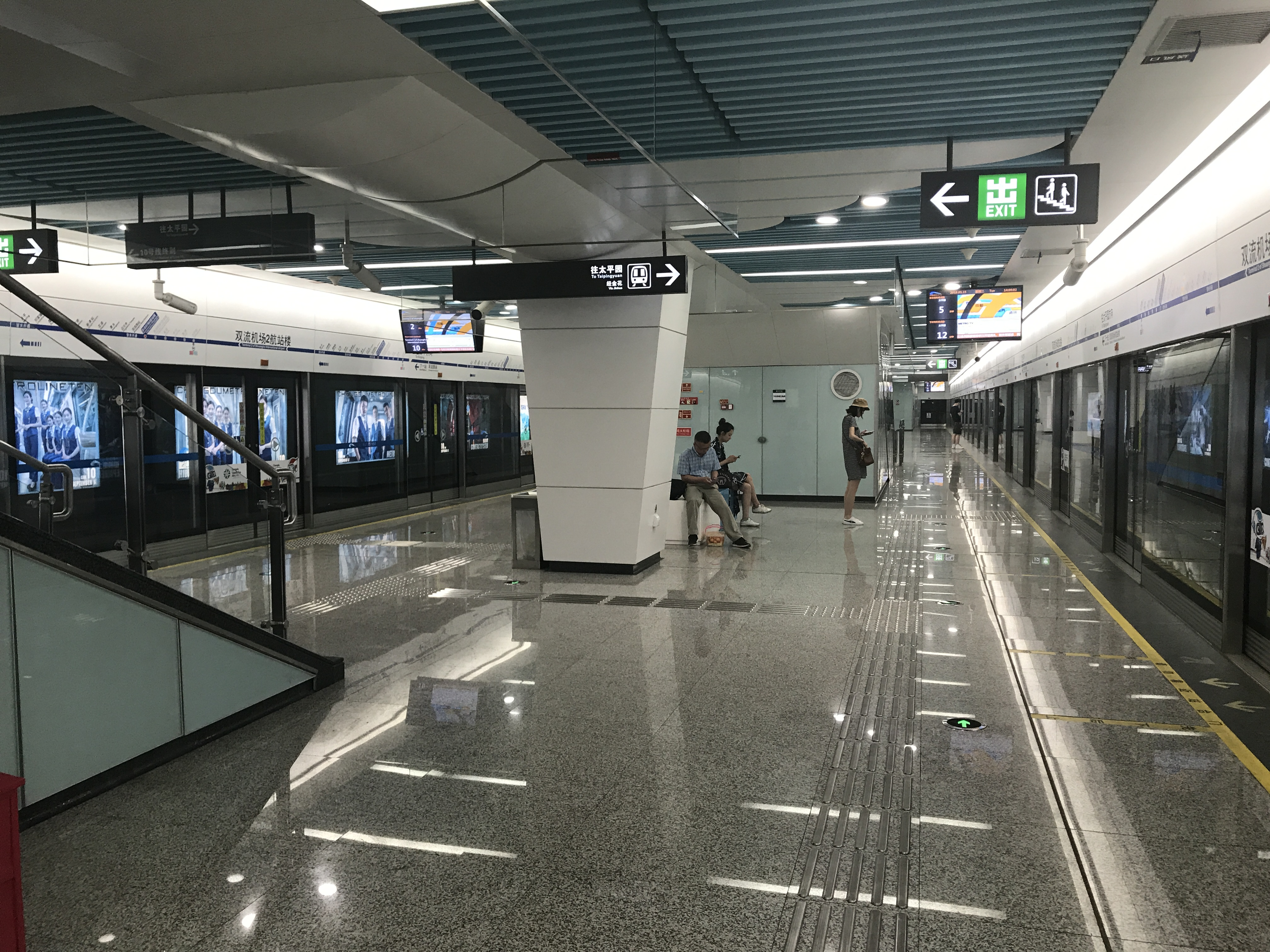
Platform
