= Wujin station =

Metro station in Chengdu, China

Wujin 五津
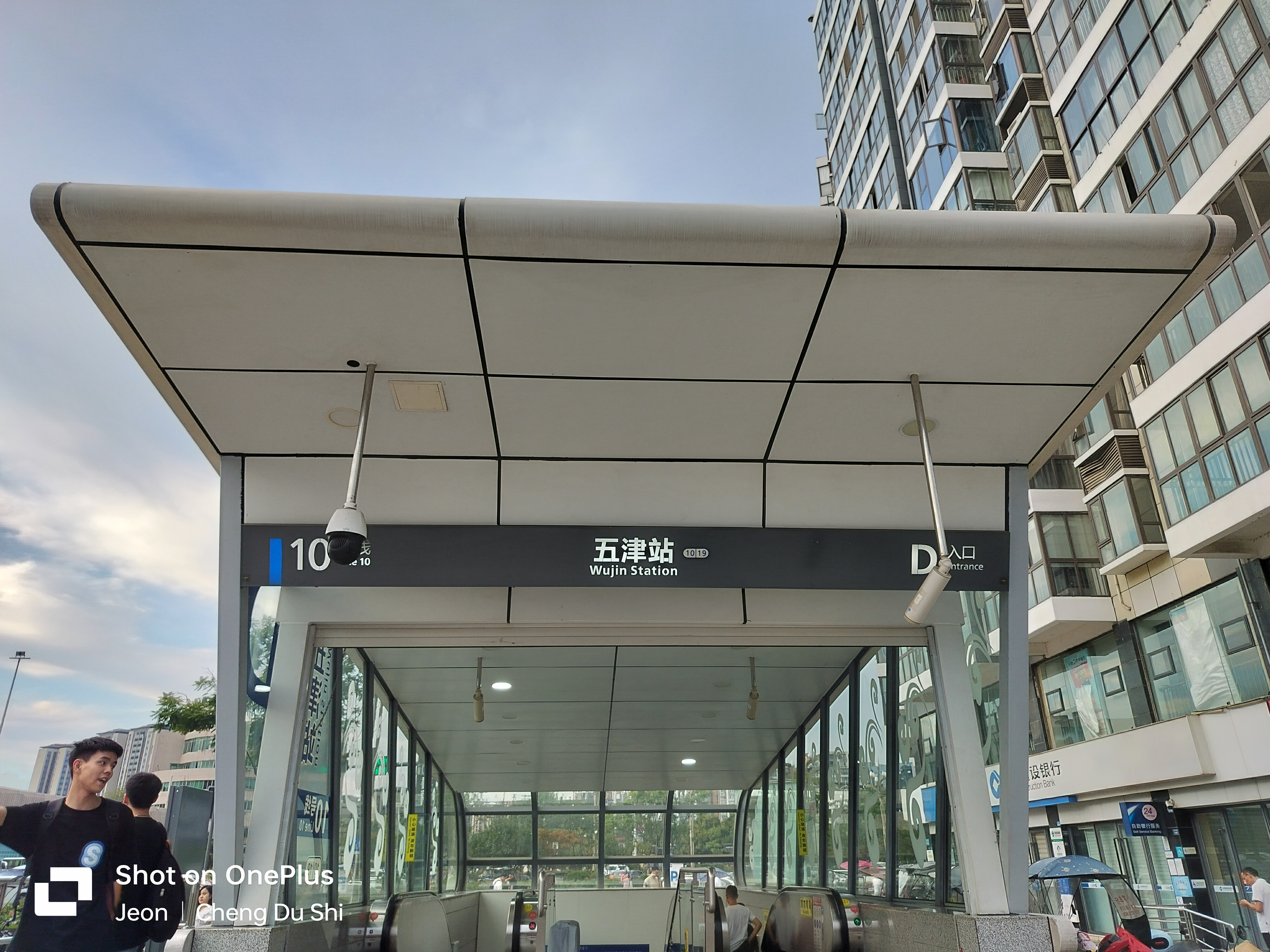
- Entrance D

General information
- Location: Xinjin District, Chengdu, Sichuan; China
- Operated by: Chengdu Metro Limited
- Line: Line 10
- Platforms: 2 (1 island platform)

Other information
- Station code: 1019

History
- Opened: 27 December 2019

Services
Preceding station	Chengdu Metro	Following station
Huaqiao towards Wuhou Shrine	Line 10	Rulin Road towards Xinping
Location

Wujin (Chinese: 五津) is a station on Line 10 of the Chengdu Metro in China. It was opened on 27 December 2019.
