= Hongpailou station =

Metro station in Chengdu, China

Hongpailou 红牌楼
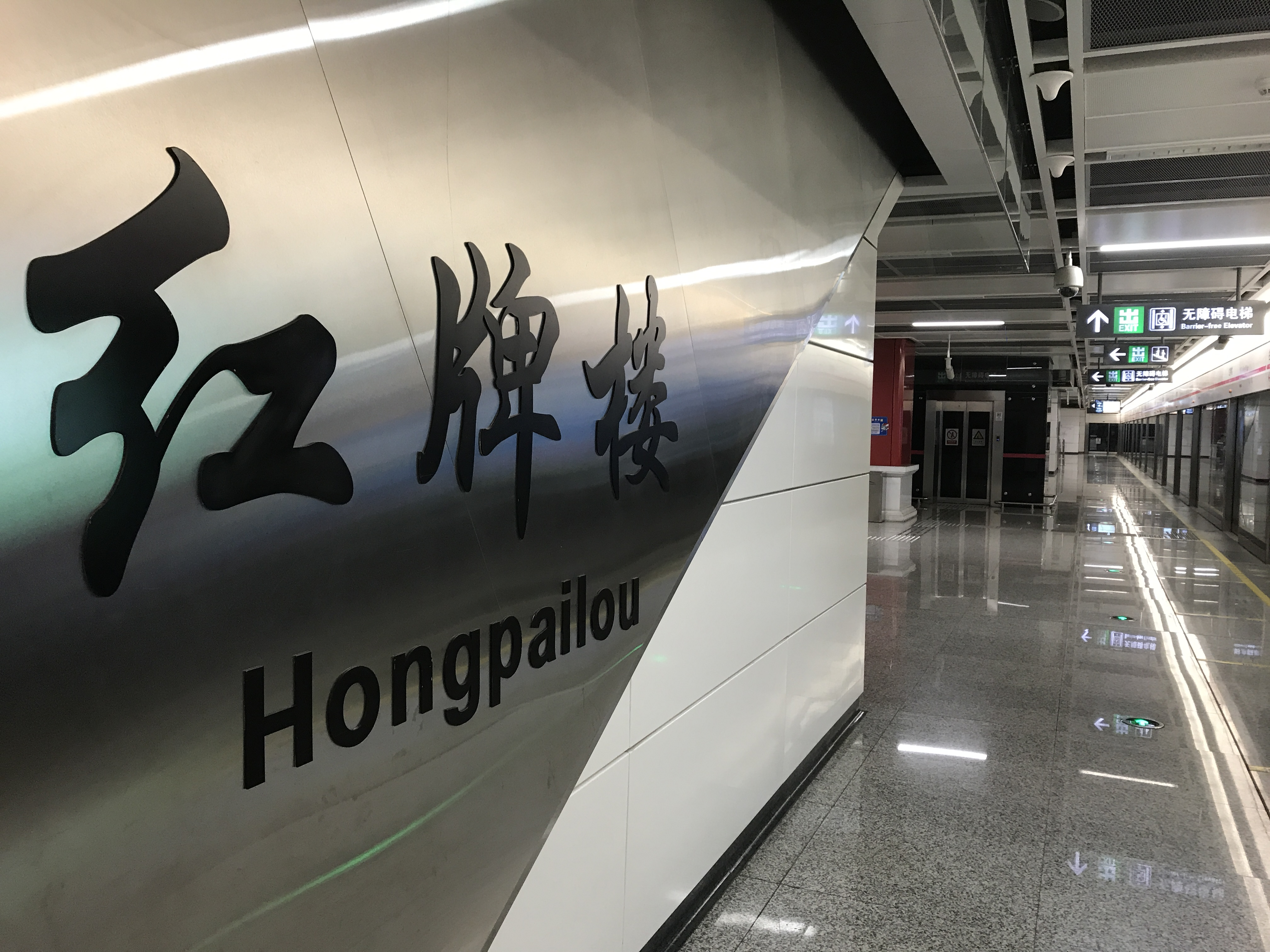

General information
- Location: Wuhou District, Chengdu, Sichuan; China
- Coordinates: 30.6364°N 104.0265°E
- Operated by: Chengdu Metro Limited
- Lines: Line 3 Line 10
- Platforms: 2 (1 island platform)

Other information
- Station code: 0325; 1006

History
- Opened: 31 July 2016 (Line 3); 17 September 2025 (Line 10)

Services
| Preceding station | Chengdu Metro | Following station |
|---|---|---|
| Gaoshengqiao towards Chengdu Medical College | Line 3 | Taipingyuan towards Shuangliu West Railway Station |
| Gaoshengqiao towards Wuhou Shrine | Line 10 | Taipingyuan towards Xinping |
Location

Hongpailou (Chinese: 红牌楼) is a station on Line 3 and Line 10 of the Chengdu Metro in China.

== Station layout ==
| G | Entrances and Exits | Exits A-D, E1-E3 |
| B1 | Concourse | Faregates, Station Agent |
| B2 | Northbound | ← Line 3 towards Chengdu Medical College (Gaoshengqiao) |
| B2 | Island platform, doors open on the left |
| B2 | Southbound | Line 3 towards Shuangliu West Station (Taipingyuan) → |
| B3 | Southbound | Line 10 towards Xinping (Taipingyuan) → |
| B3 | Island platform, doors open on the left |
| B3 | Northbound | ← Line 10 towards Wuhou Shrine (Gaoshengqiao) |

== Gallery ==
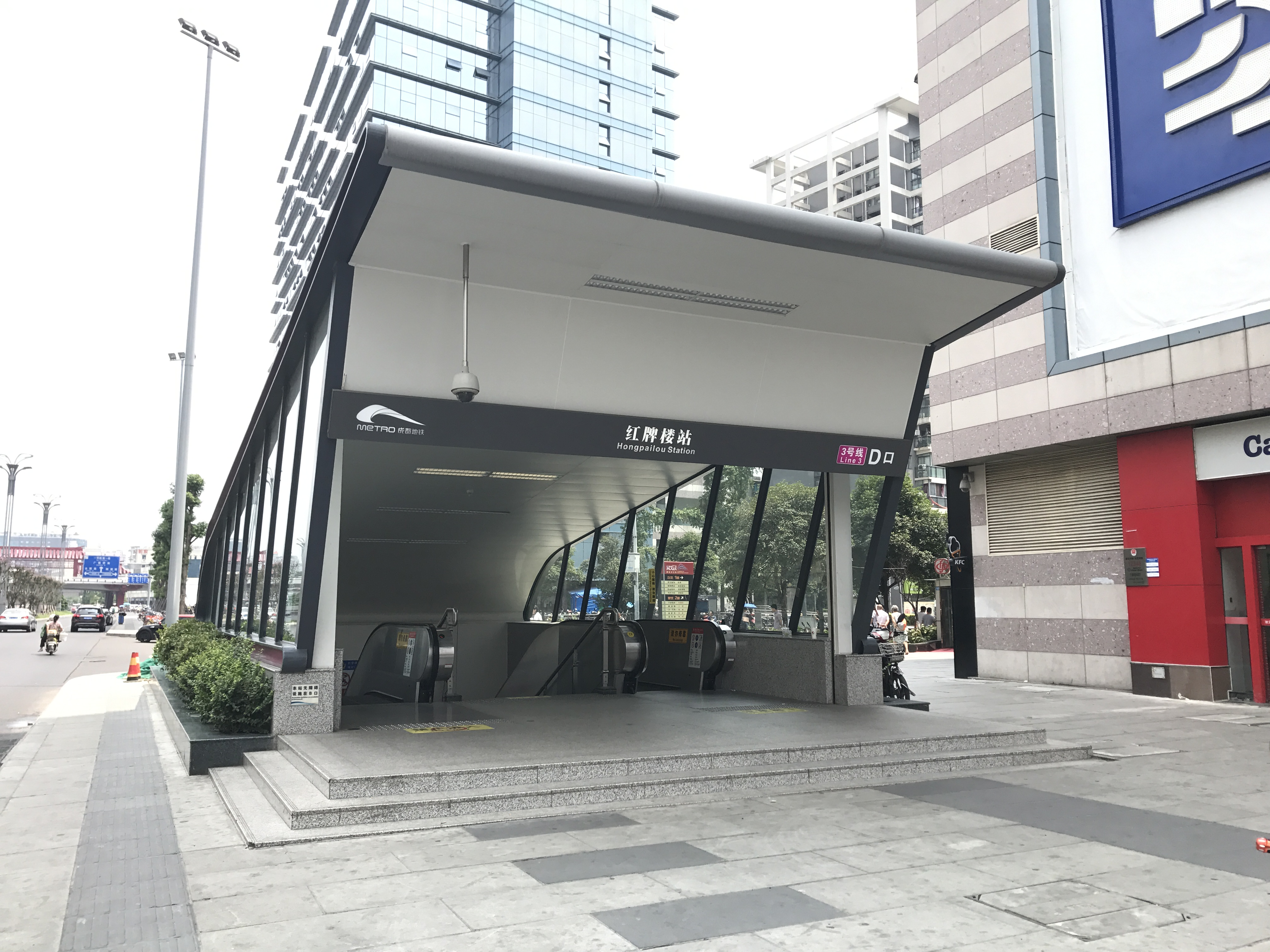
Entrance D

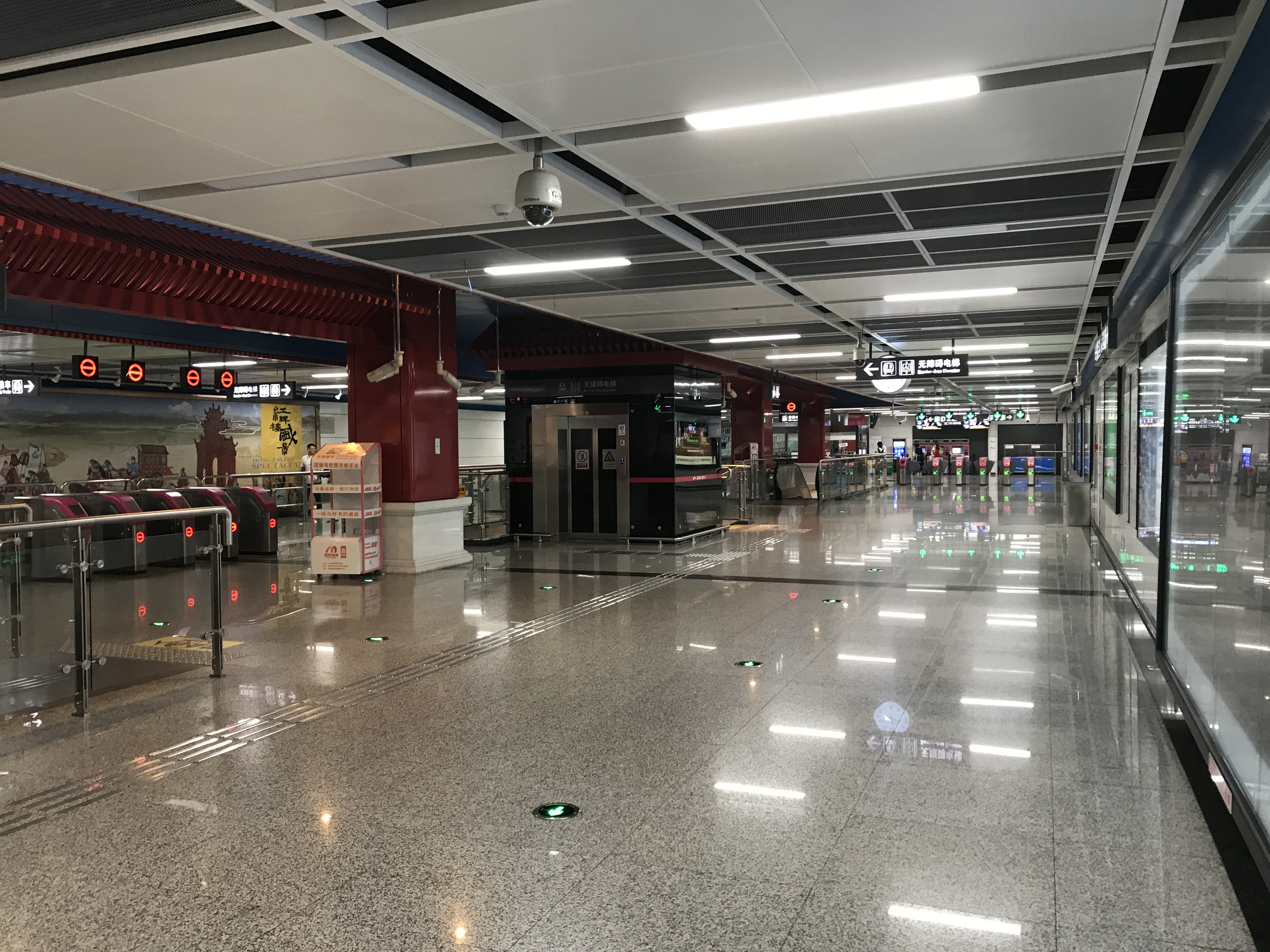
Line 3 Concourse

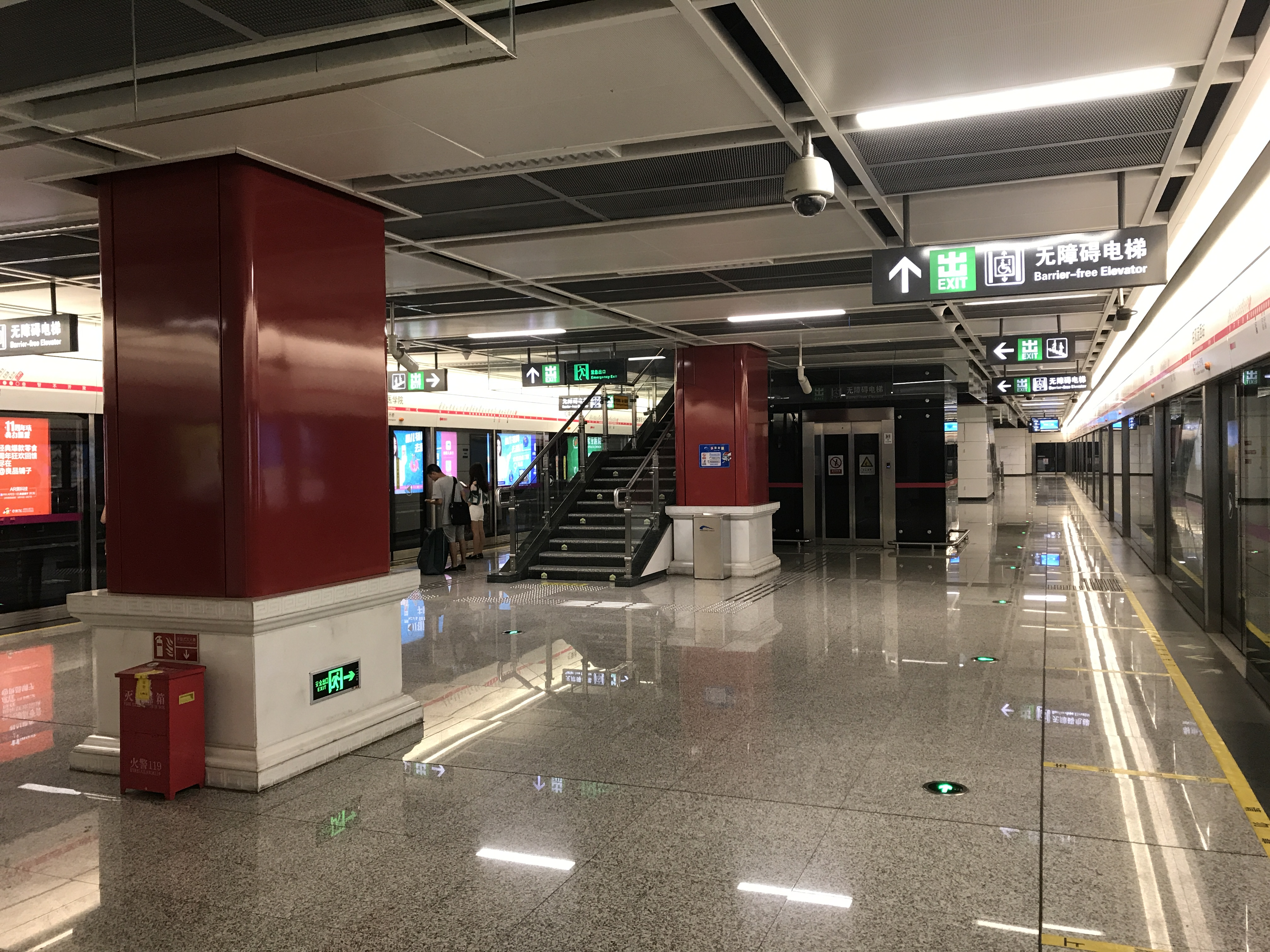
Line 3 Platform
