= Jinhua station =

Jinhua station can refer to:

- Jinhua station (Chengdu Metro), a metro station in Chengdu, China
- Jinhua railway station, a railway station in Jinhua, China
