= Rulin Road station =

Metro station in Chengdu, China

Rulin Road 儒林路
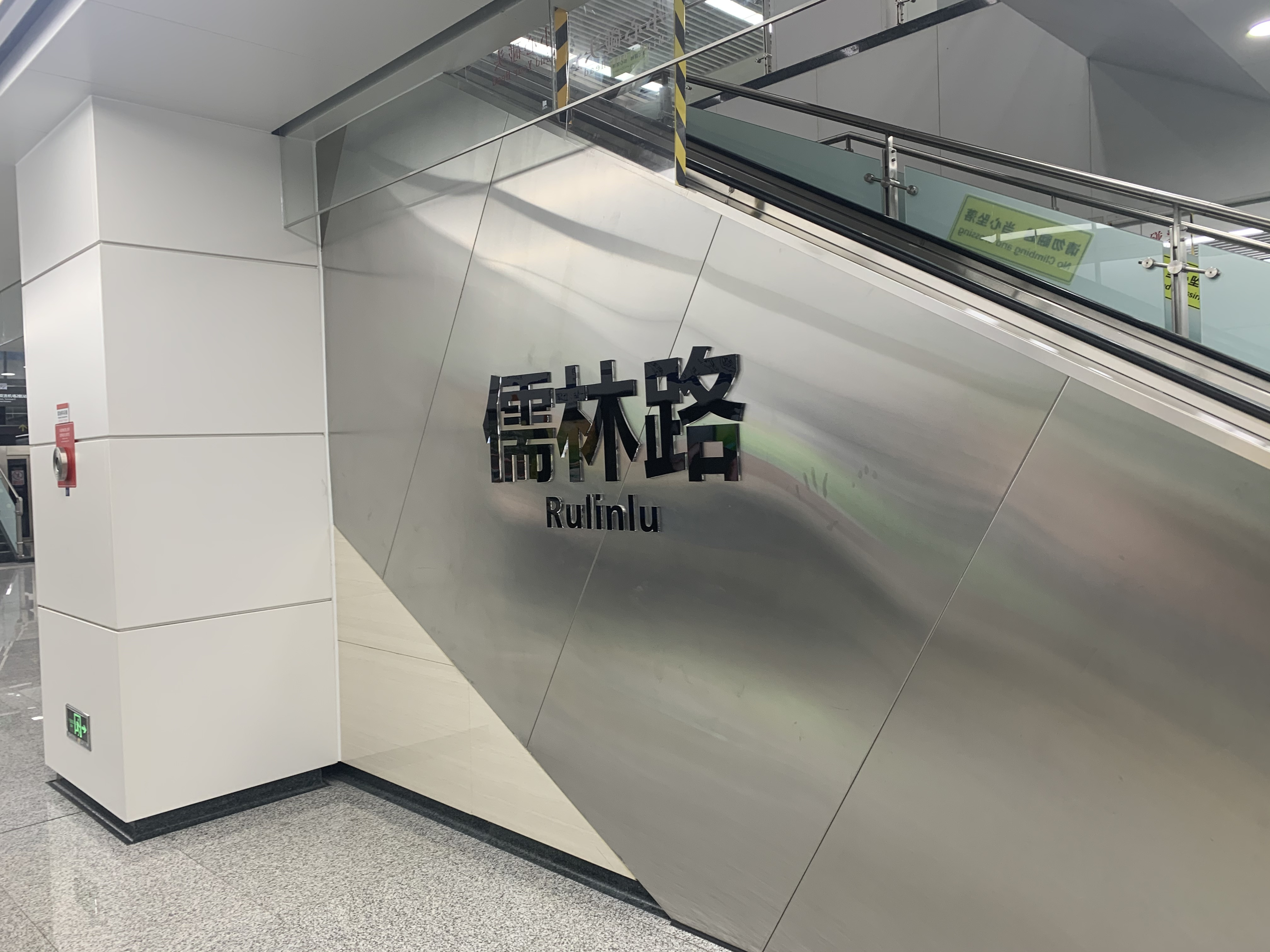

General information
- Location: Xinjin District, Chengdu, Sichuan; China
- Operated by: Chengdu Metro Limited
- Line: Line 10
- Platforms: 2 (1 island platform)

Other information
- Station code: 1020

History
- Opened: 27 December 2019
- Previous names: Rulinlu

Services
Preceding station	Chengdu Metro	Following station
Wujin towards Wuhou Shrine	Line 10	Liujianian towards Xinping
Location

Rulin Road (Chinese: 儒林路) is a station on Line 10 of the Chengdu Metro in China. It was opened on 27 December 2019.
