= Huaxing station =

Metro station in Chengdu, China

Huaxing 华兴
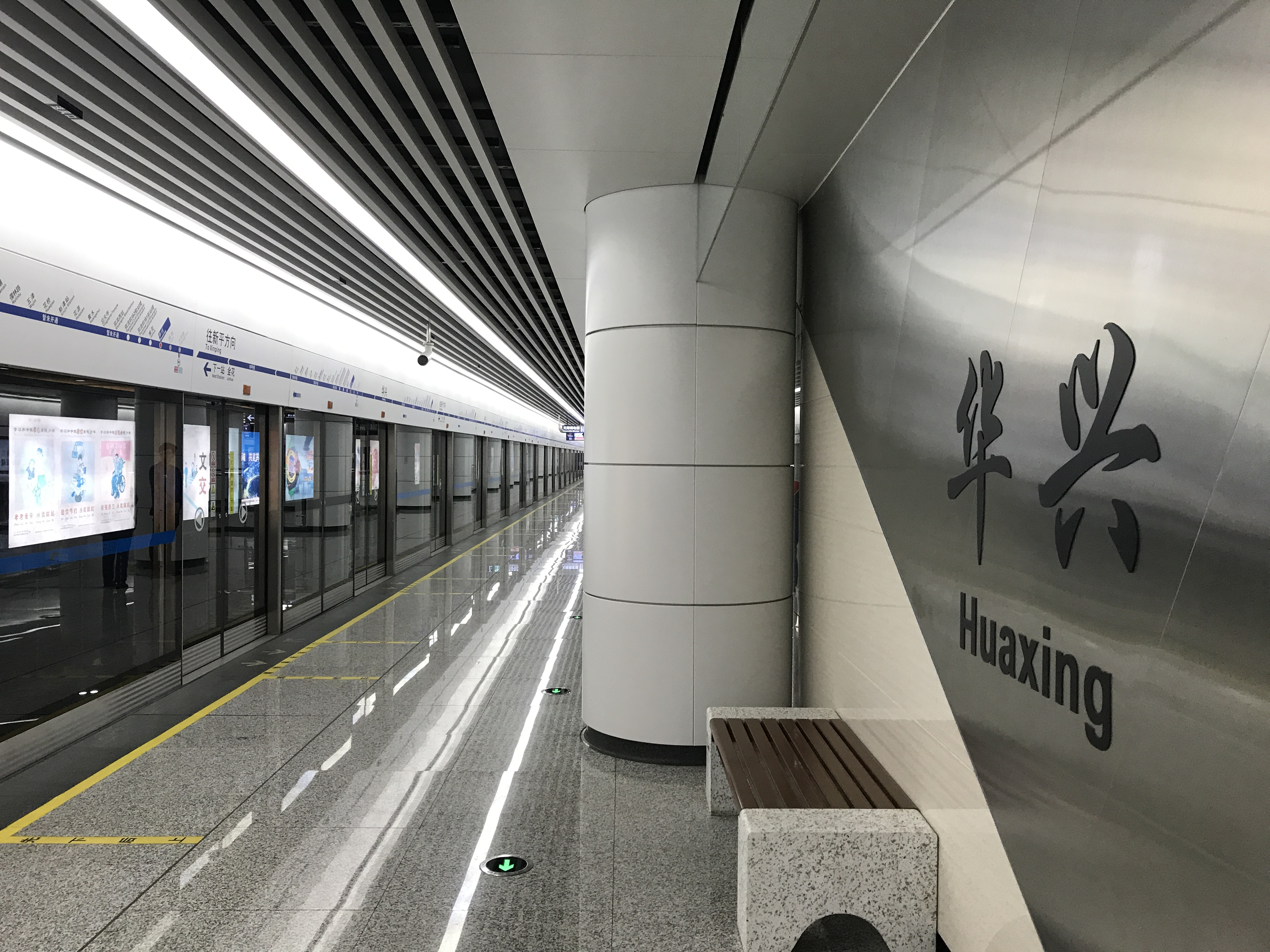

General information
- Location: Wuhou District, Chengdu, Sichuan; China
- Operator: Chengdu Metro Limited
- Lines: Line 9 Line 10
- Platforms: 4 (2 island platforms)

Other information
- Station code: 0907 1009

History
- Opened: 6 September 2017

Services
Preceding station	Chengdu Metro	Following station
Taiping Temple towards Financial City East	Line 9	Cuqiao towards Huangtianba
Cujin towards Wuhou Shrine	Line 10	Jinhua towards Xinping
Location

Huaxing (Chinese: 华兴) is a station on Line 9 and Line 10 of the Chengdu Metro in China. It was opened on 6 September 2017.

== Station layout ==
G	Entrances and Exits	Exits A-F
B1	Concourse	Faregates, Station Agent
B2	Northbound	← Line 10 to Wuhou Shrine (Cujin)
B2	Island platform, doors open on the left
B2	Southbound	Line 10 to Xinping (Jinhua) →
B3	Northbound	← Line 9 towards Huangtianba (Cuqiao)
B3	Island platform, doors open on the left
B3	Southbound	Line 9 towards Financial City East (Taiping Temple) →

== Gallery ==
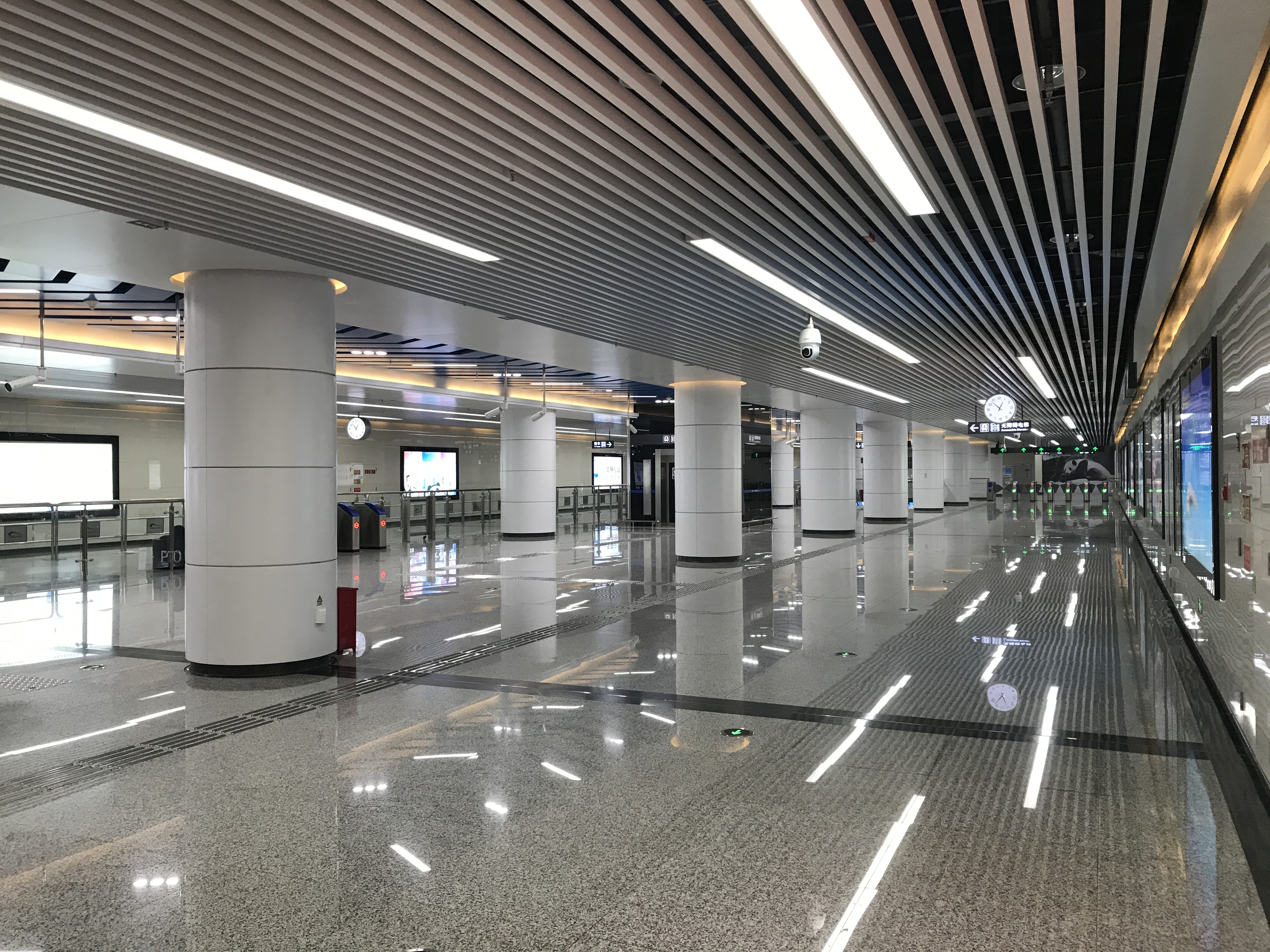
Concourse

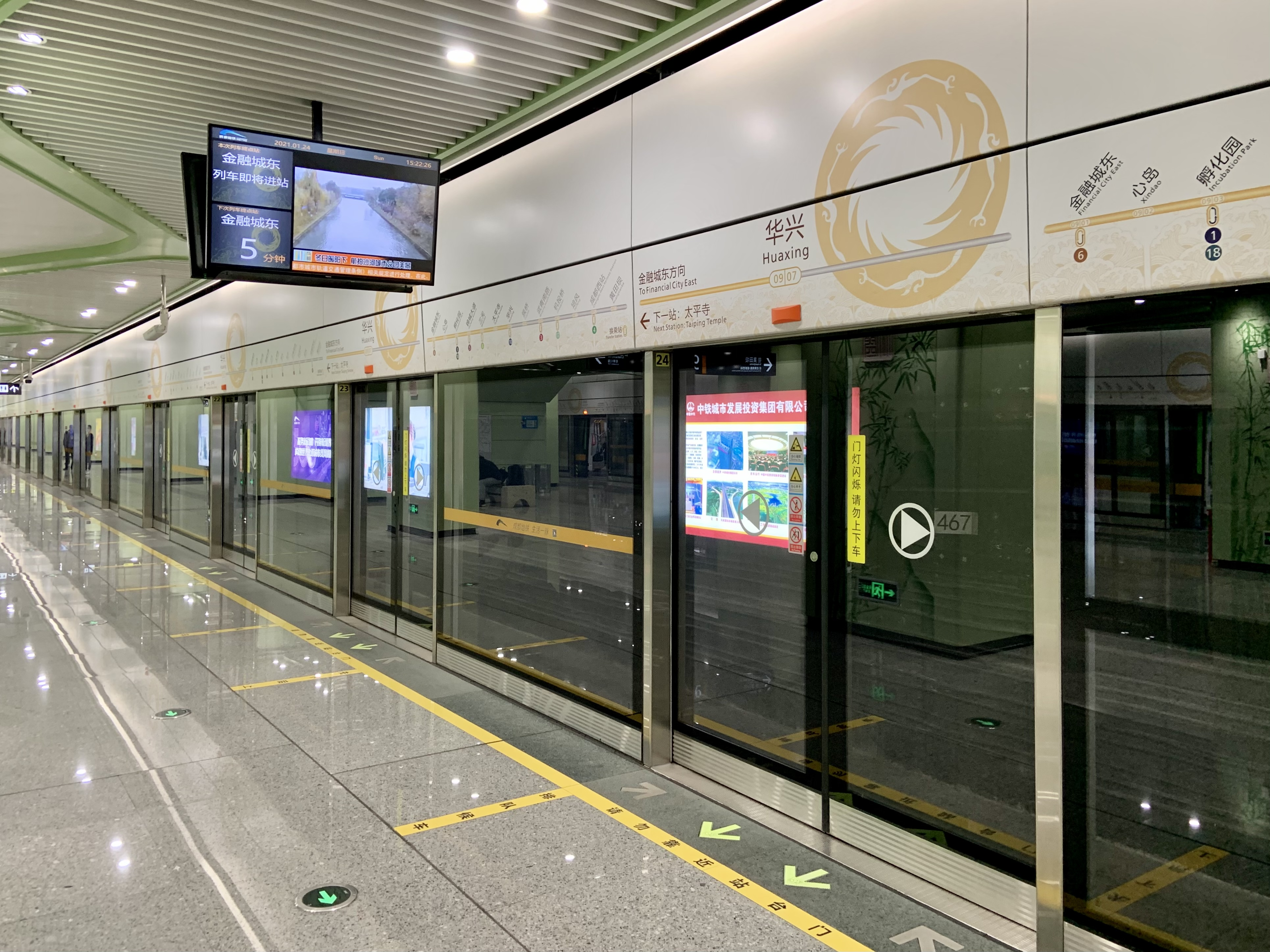
Line 9 platform

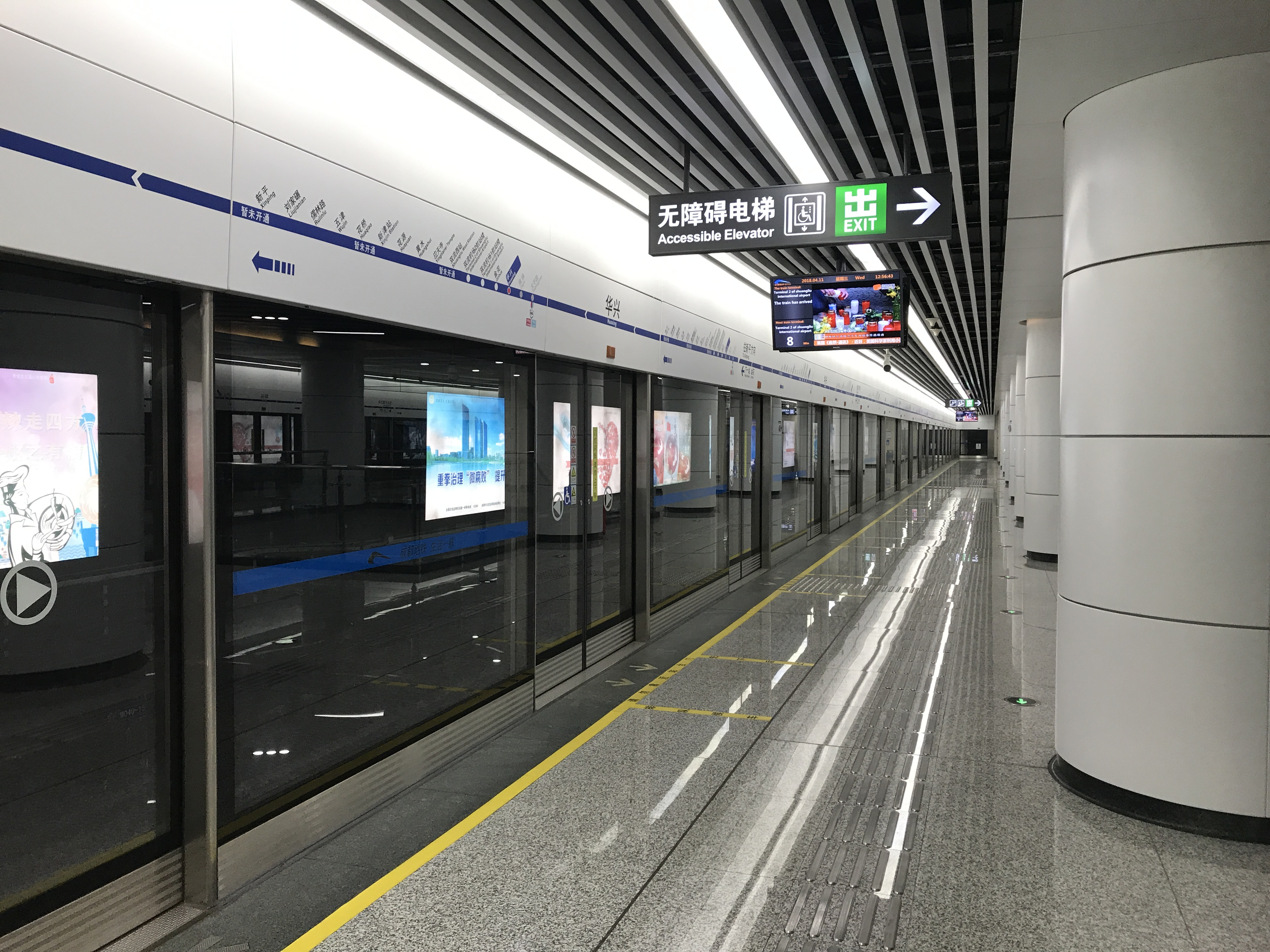
Line 10 platform
