= Huaqiao station (Chengdu Metro) =

Metro station in Chengdu, China

Huaqiao 花桥
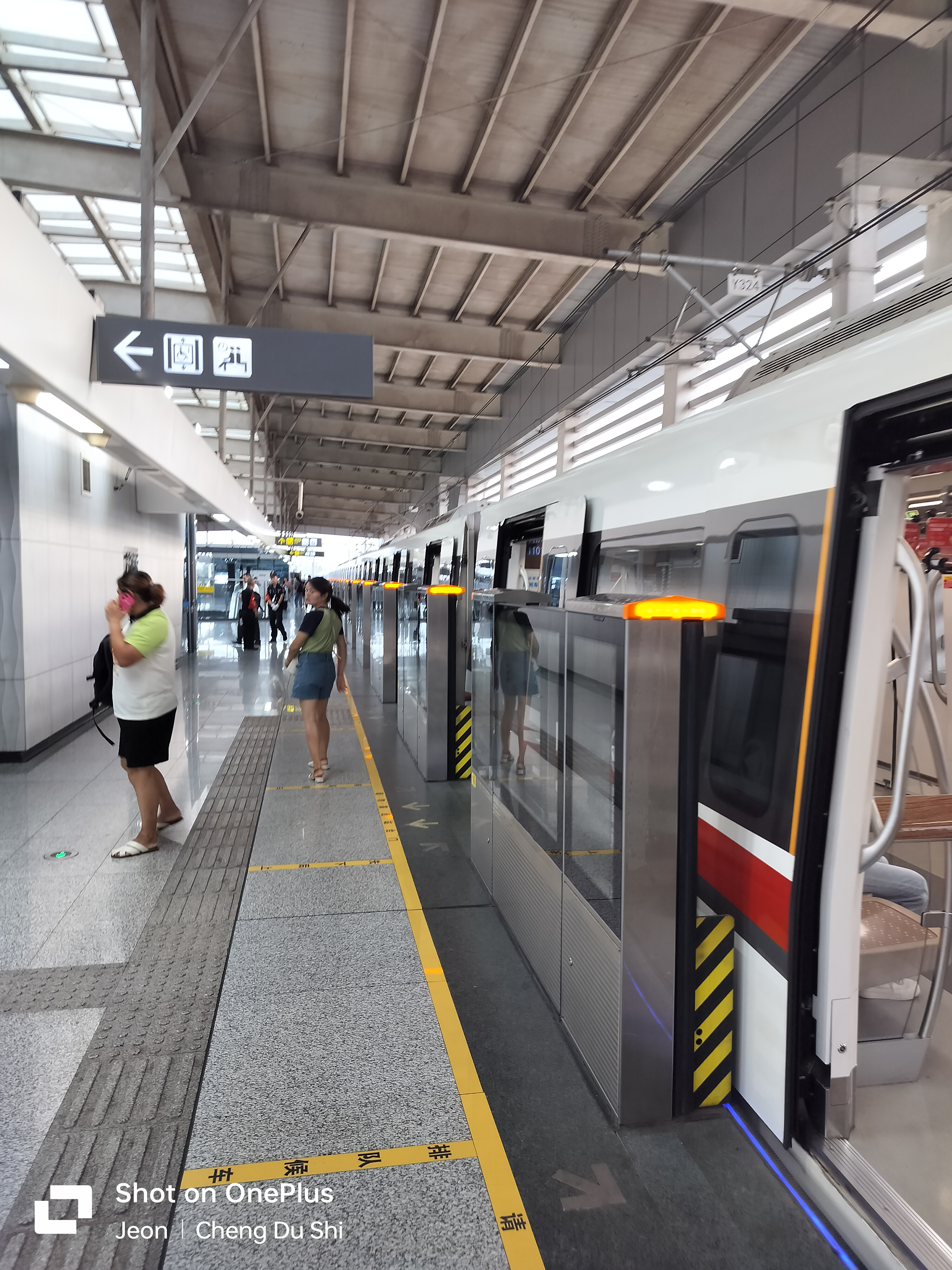

General information
- Location: Xinjin District, Chengdu, Sichuan; China
- Coordinates: 30.4444°N 103.8551°E
- Operated by: Chengdu Metro Limited
- Line: Line 10
- Platforms: 2 (1 island platform)

Other information
- Station code: 1018

History
- Opened: 27 December 2019

Services
Preceding station	Chengdu Metro	Following station
Xinjin Railway Station towards Wuhou Shrine	Line 10	Wujin towards Xinping
Location

Huaqiao (Chinese: 花桥) is a station on Line 10 of the Chengdu Metro in China. It was opened on 27 December 2019.
