= Cujin station =

Metro station in Chengdu, China

Coordinates: 30.6136°N 104.0057°E

Cujin 簇锦
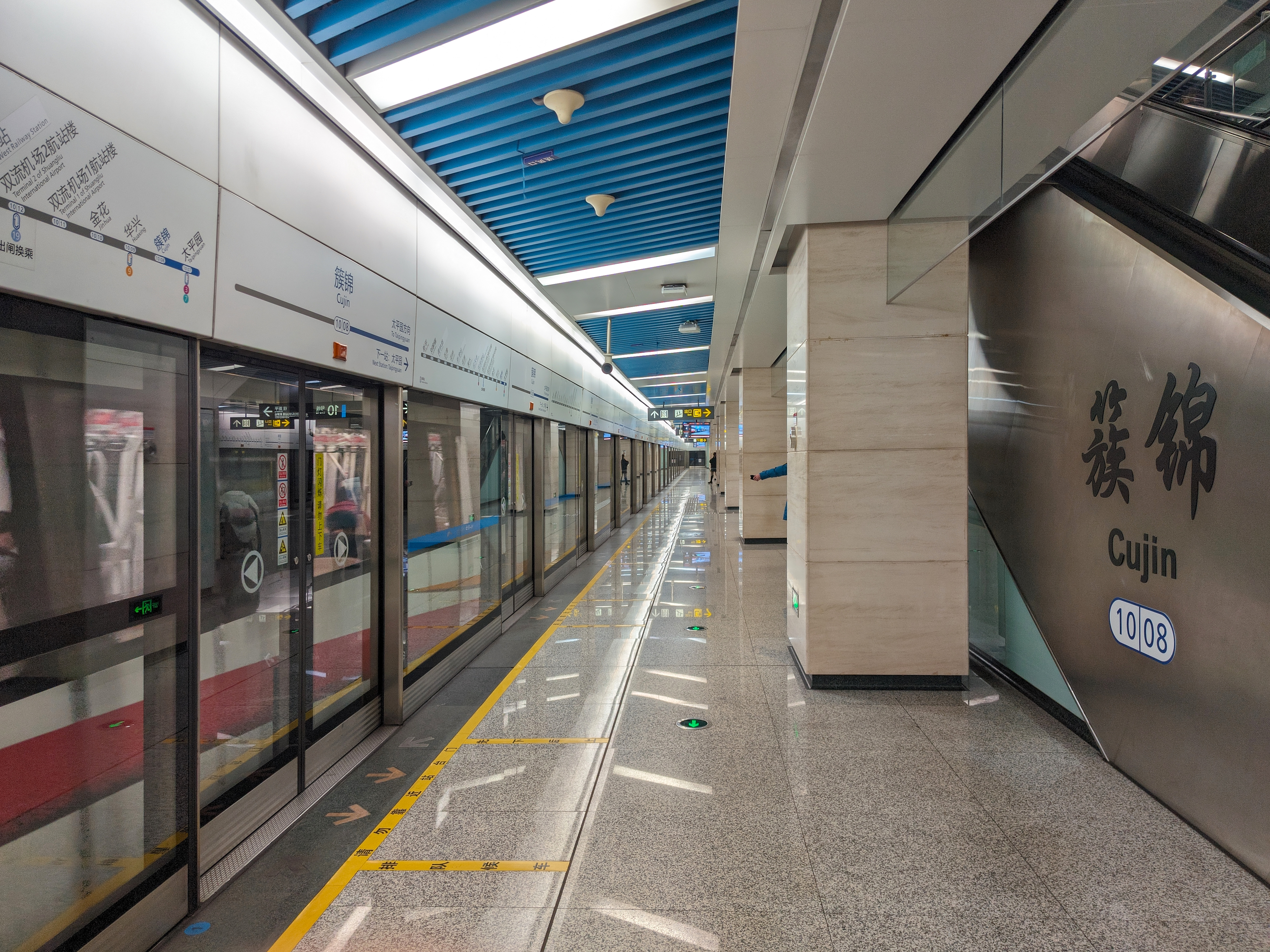

General information
- Location: Wuhou District, Chengdu, Sichuan; China
- Operator: Chengdu Metro Limited
- Line: Line 10
- Platforms: 2 (1 island platform)

Other information
- Station code: 1008

History
- Opened: 6 September 2017

Services
Preceding station	Chengdu Metro	Following station
Taipingyuan towards Wuhou Shrine	Line 10	Huaxing towards Xinping
Location

Cujin (Chinese: 簇锦) is a station on Line 10 of the Chengdu Metro in China. It was opened on 6 September 2017.

== Station layout ==
G	Entrances and Exits	Exits A-D
B1	Concourse	Faregates, Station Agent
B2	Southbound	Line 10 to Xinping (Huaxing) →
B2	Island platform, doors open on the right
B2	Northbound	← Line 10 to Wuhou Shrine (Taipingyuan)
