= Huangshui station =

Metro station in Chengdu, China

Huangshui 黄水
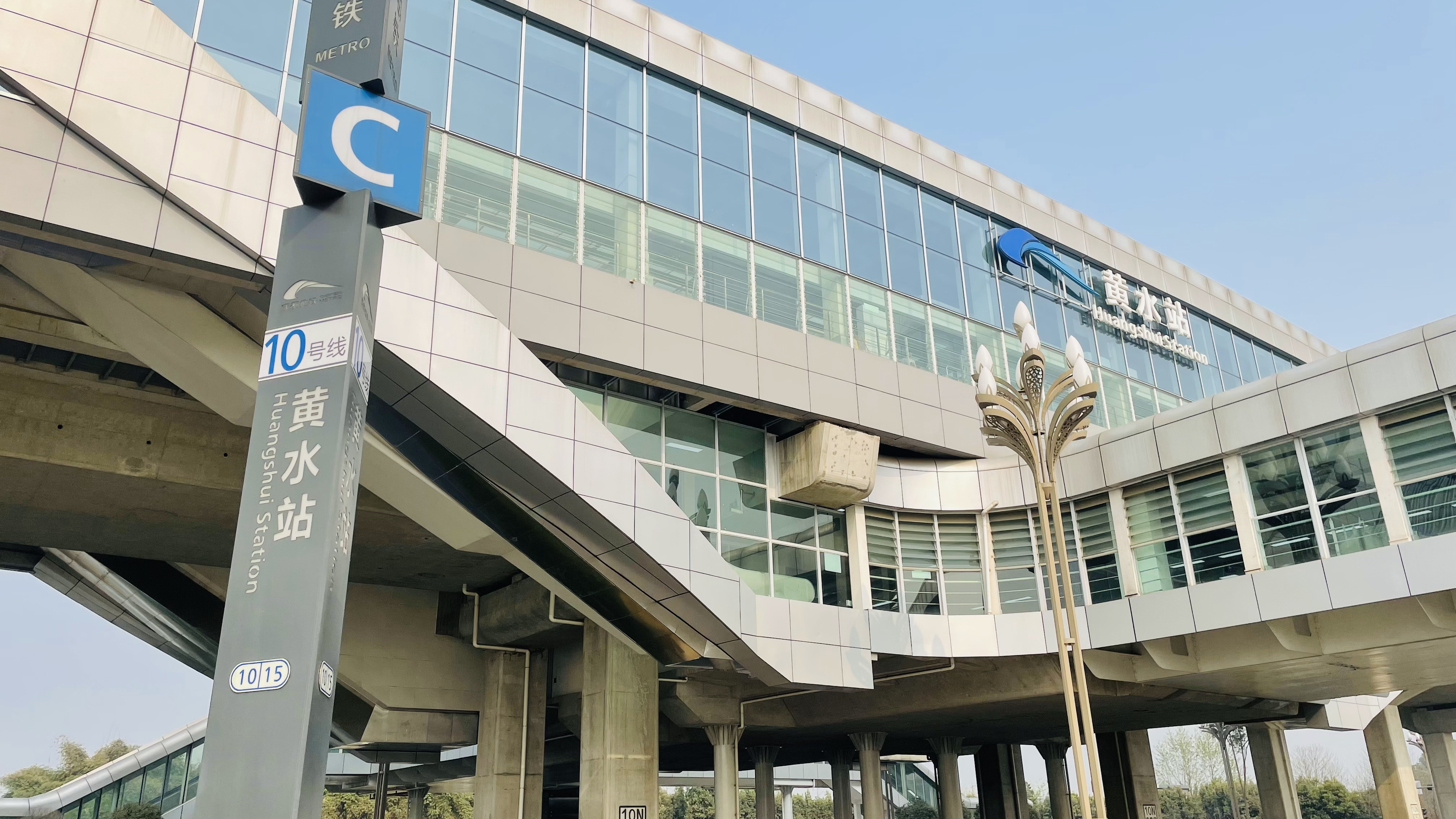

General information
- Location: Shuangliu District, Chengdu, Sichuan; China
- Coordinates: 30.5218°N 103.8891°E
- Operated by: Chengdu Metro Limited
- Line: Line 10
- Platforms: 2 (2 side platforms)

Other information
- Station code: 1015

History
- Opened: 27 December 2019

Services
Preceding station	Chengdu Metro	Following station
Yingtian Temple towards Wuhou Shrine	Line 10	Huayuan towards Xinping
Location

Huangshui (Chinese: 黄水) is a station on Line 10 of the Chengdu Metro in China. It was opened on 27 December 2019.
