= Huayuan station =

Huayuan station can refer to:

- Huayuan station (Chengdu Metro), a metro station in Chengdu, China
- Huayuan station (Tianjin Metro), a metro station in Tianjin, China
