= Yingtian Temple station =

Metro station in Chengdu, China

Yingtian Temple 应天寺
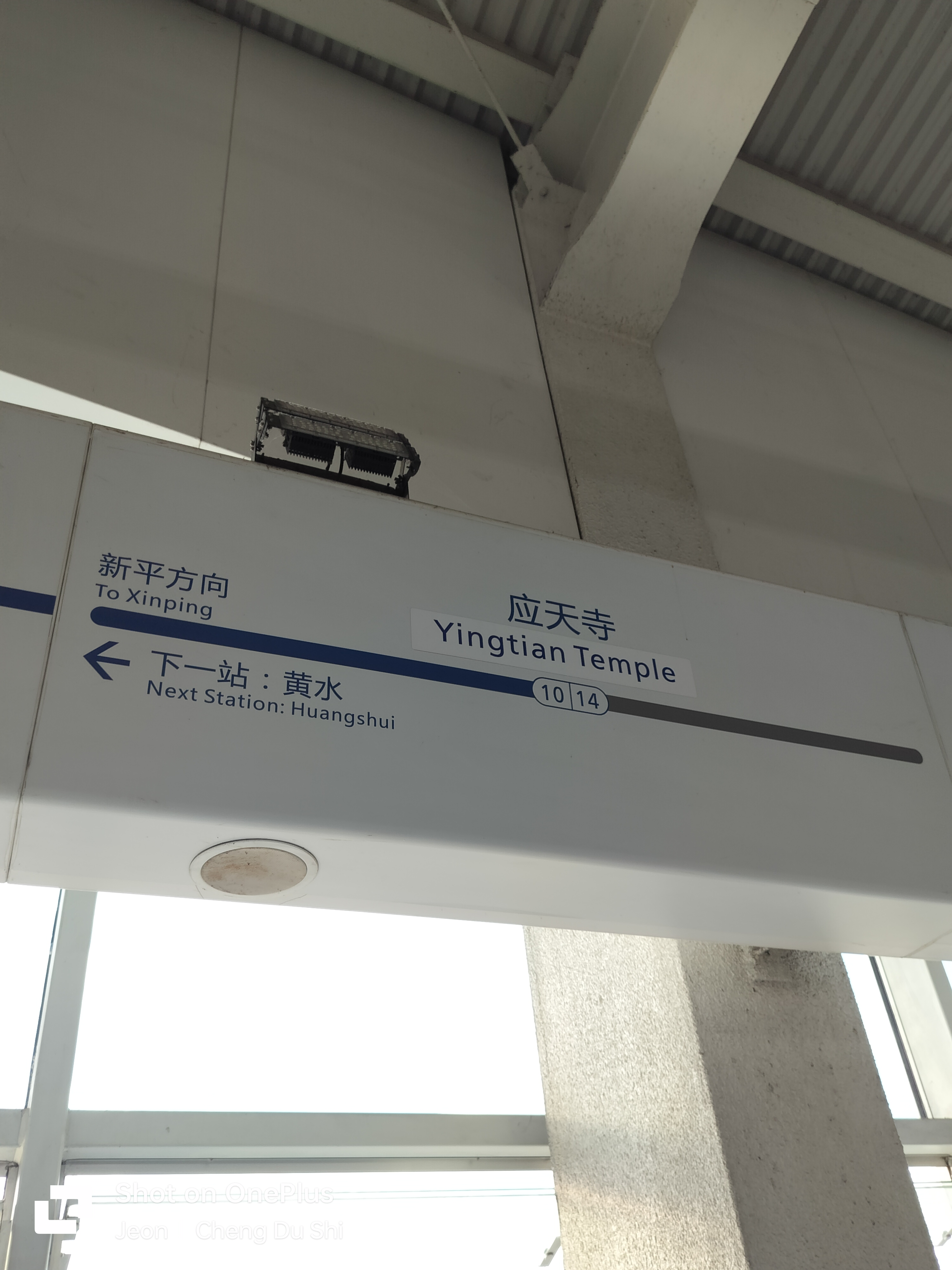

General information
- Location: Shuangliu District, Chengdu, Sichuan; China
- Coordinates: 30.5385°N 103.9026°E
- Operated by: Chengdu Metro Limited
- Line: Line 10
- Platforms: 2 (2 side platforms)

Other information
- Station code: 1014

History
- Opened: 27 December 2019

Services
Preceding station	Chengdu Metro	Following station
Shuangliu West Railway Station towards Wuhou Shrine	Line 10	Huangshui towards Xinping
Location

Yingtian Temple (Chinese: 应天寺) is a station on Line 10 of the Chengdu Metro in China. It was opened on 27 December 2019.
