= Jinhua station (Chengdu Metro) =

Metro station in Chengdu, China

Jinhua 金花
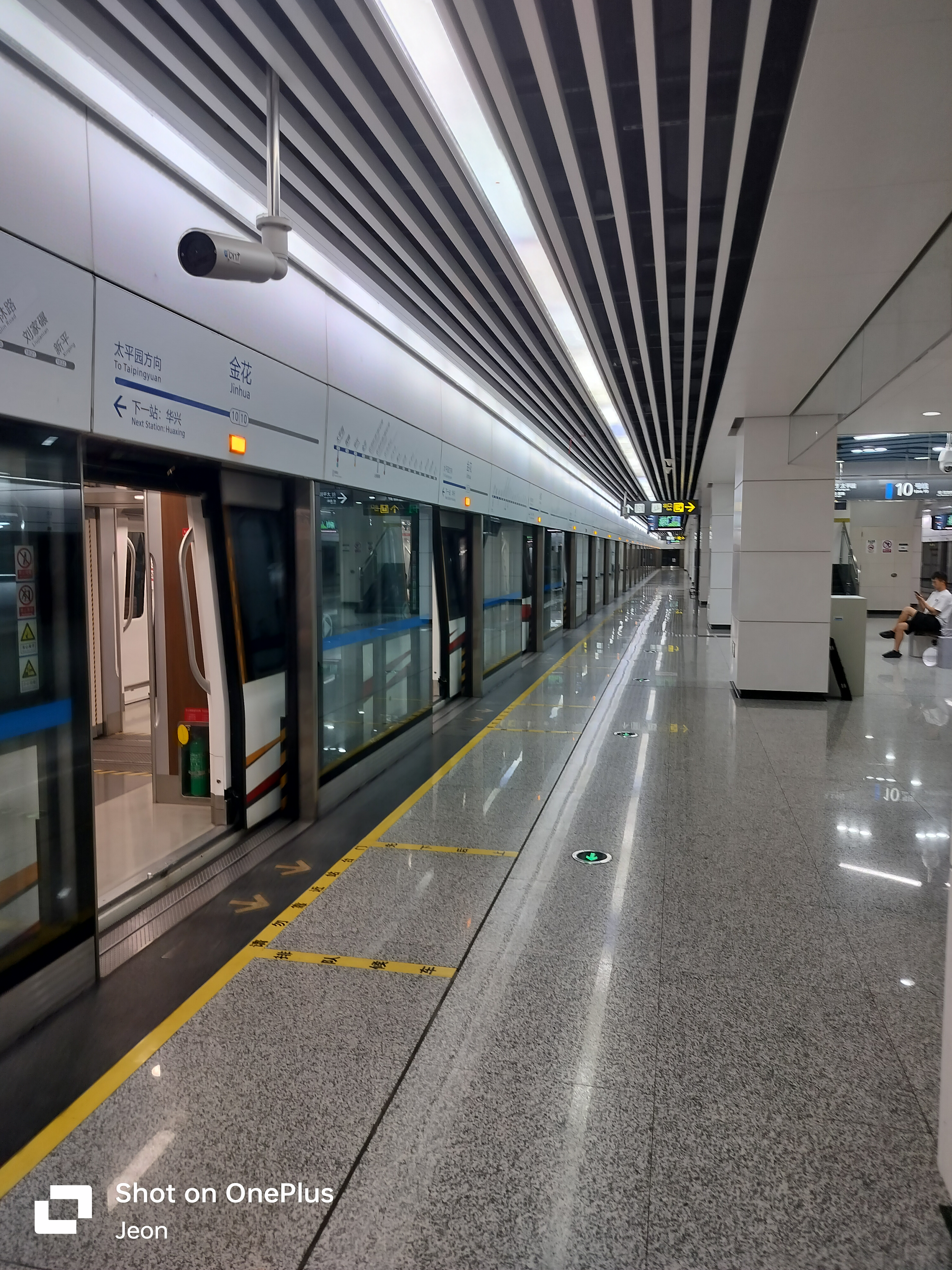

General information
- Location: Wuhou District, Chengdu, Sichuan; China
- Operator: Chengdu Metro Limited
- Line: Line 10
- Platforms: 2 (1 island platform)

Other information
- Station code: 1010

History
- Opened: 6 September 2017

Services
Preceding station	Chengdu Metro	Following station
Huaxing towards Wuhou Shrine	Line 10	Terminal 1 of Shuangliu International Airport towards Xinping
Location

Jinhua (Chinese: 金花) is a station on Line 10 of the Chengdu Metro in China. It was opened on 6 September 2017.

== Station layout ==
G	Entrances and Exits	Exits A, C, D
B1	Concourse	Faregates, Station Agent
B2	Northbound	← Line 10 to Wuhou Shrine (Huaxing)
B2	Island platform, doors open on the left
B2	Southbound	Line 10 to Xinping (Terminal 1 of Shuangliu International Airport) →
