= Shuangliu Airport railway station =

Railway station in Chengdu, China

Shuangliu Airport railway station 双流机场站
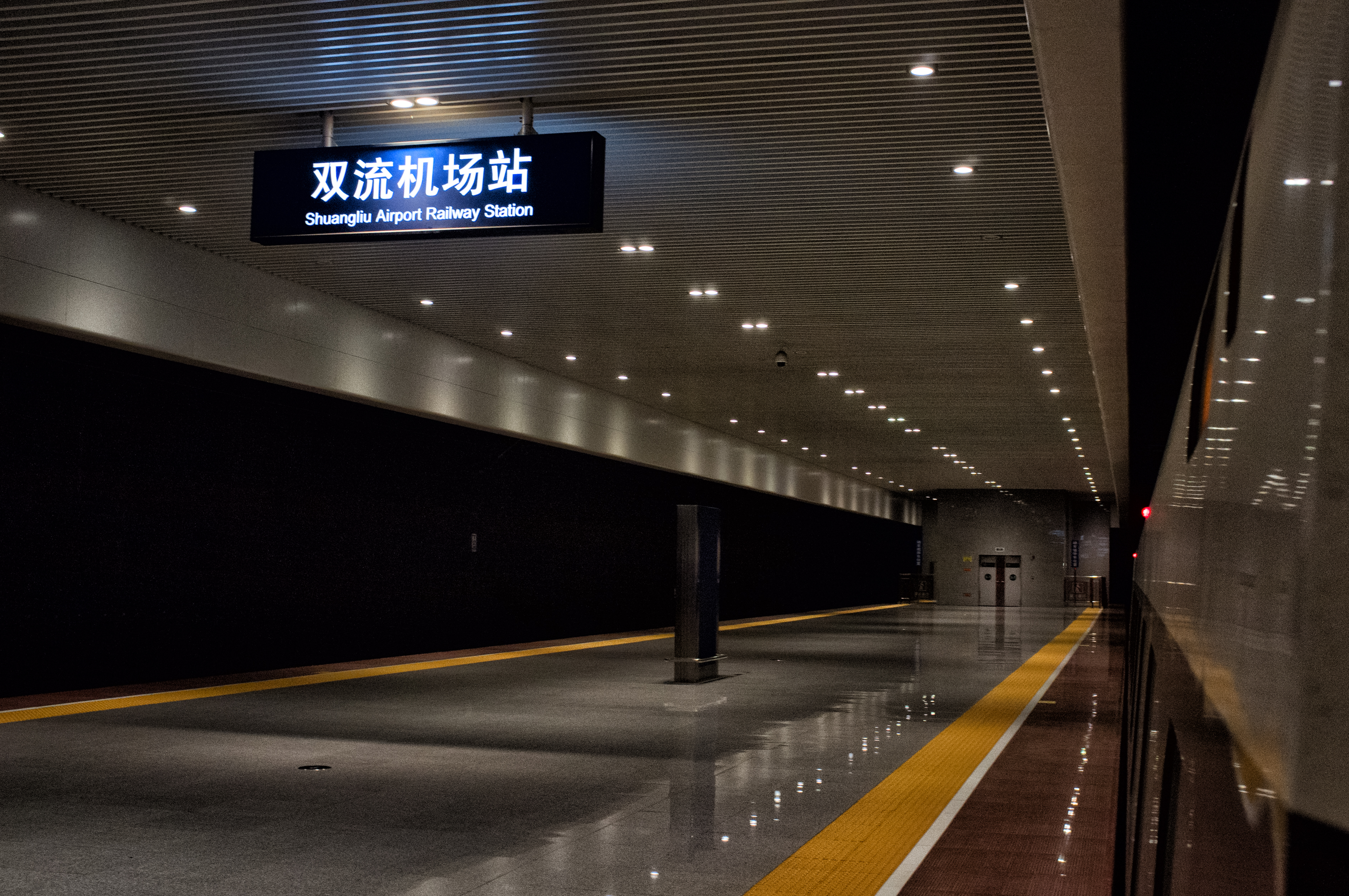

General information
- Other names: Shuangliujichang railway station
- Location: Shuangliu, Chengdu, Sichuan; China
- Operator: Chengdu Railway Bureau, China Railway Corporation
- Lines: Chengdu–Guiyang high-speed railway Chengdu–Mianyang–Leshan intercity railway
- Platforms: 2 (1 island platform)

Other information
- Station code: TMIS code: 47621; Telegraph code: IPW; Pinyin code: SLC

History
- Opened: 20 December 2014
Location

The Shuangliu Airport railway station or Shuangliujichang railway station (Chinese: 双流机场站) is located in Shuangliu County on the Chengdu–Guiyang High-Speed Railway, which serves as an airport rail link system for the Chengdu Shuangliu International Airport.

The station is underneath airport Terminal 2 and connects to Terminal 2 of Shuangliu International Airport station on Line 10 of the Chengdu Metro. It takes about 10 minutes from the Chengdu East railway station to the Airport. The station opened on 20 December 2014, along with the railway. Metro Line 10 connects the City Centre and the Airport.
