= Line 10 (Chengdu Metro) =

Metro line in Chengdu, China

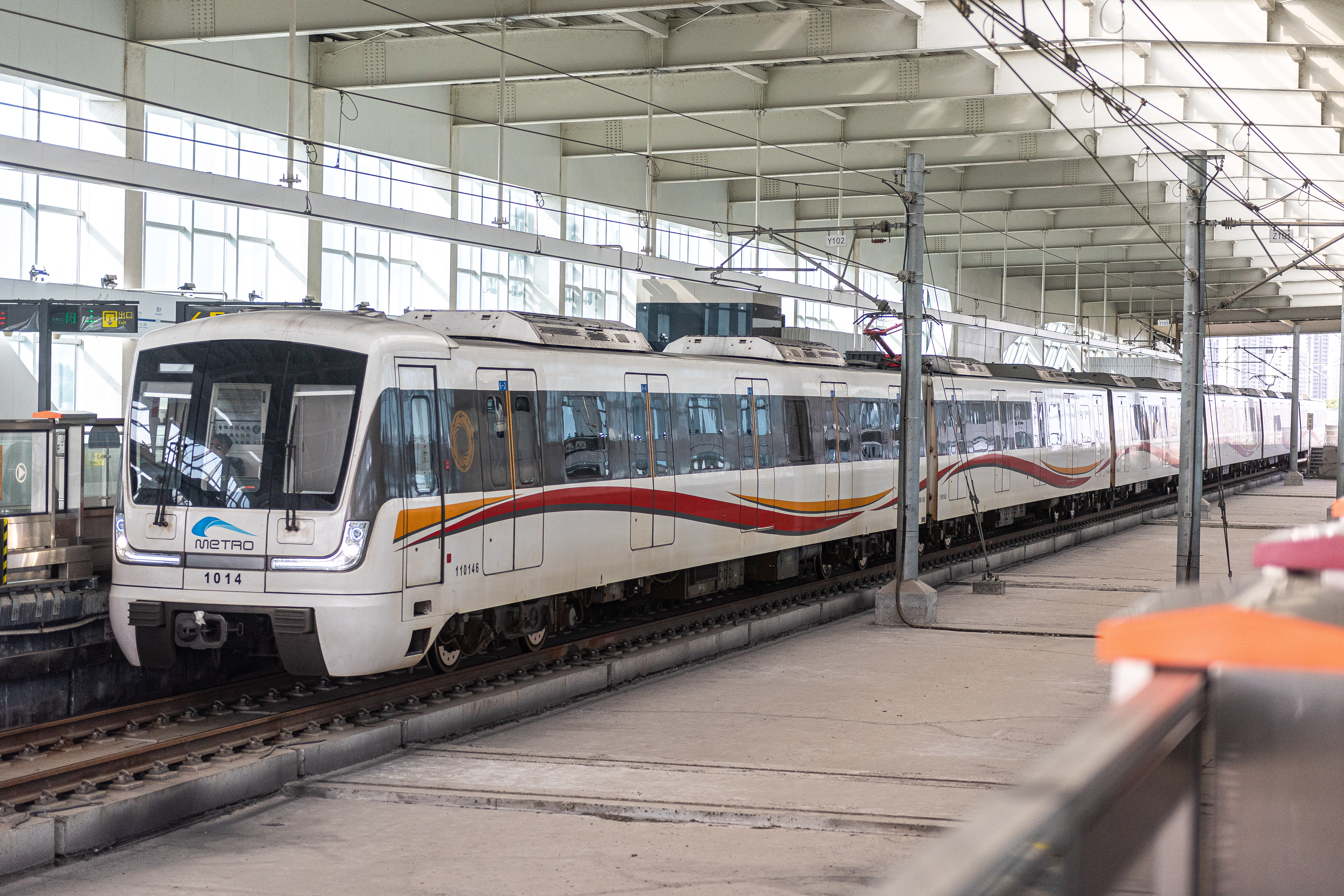
- A Line 10 train entering at Huangshui station

Overview
- Status: Operational
- Owner: City of Chengdu
- Locale: Chengdu, Sichuan
- Termini: Wuhou Shrine; Xinping
- Stations: 19

Service
- Type: Rapid transit
- System: Chengdu Metro
- Services: 2
- Operator(s): Chengdu Metro Corporation
- Daily ridership: 106,800 (2018 Peak)

History
- Opened: 6 September 2017; 8 years ago

Technical
- Line length: 43.9 km (27.3 mi)
- Number of tracks: 2
- Character: underground and elevated
- Track gauge: 1,435 mm (4 ft 8 1/2 in)
- Electrification: overhead lines, 1,500 V DC
- Operating speed: 100 km/h (62 mph)

Line 10 of the Chengdu Metro (simplified Chinese: 成都地铁10号线; traditional Chinese: 成都地鐵10號線; pinyin: Chéngdū Dìtiě Shí Hào Xiàn) runs from Taipingyuan in Wuhou to Xinping in Xinjin. Currently, the line is 37.972 km (23.6 mi) long. In 2024, the line will be 43.9 km long with the 5.9 km northeastern extension (Phase 3) to People's Park.

Phase I of Line 10 began construction in July 2014 and opened in September 2017. Phase II began construction in 2016 and opened on December 27, 2019. It is the first line in Chengdu Metro to use 6-car Type A rolling stock for service.

Line 10's color is sky blue.

== Opening timeline ==
Segment	Commencement	Length	Station(s)	Name
Taipingyuan — Shuangliu International Airport Terminal 2	6 September 2017	10.937 km (6.8 mi)	6	Phase 1
Shuangliu International Airport Terminal 2 — Xinping	27 December 2019	27.035 km (16.8 mi)	10	Phase 2
Wuhou Shrine — Taipingyuan	17 September 2025	5.87 km (3.6 mi)	3	Phase 3 (Initial section)

== Stations ==
Service routes		Station No.	Station name		Transfer	Distance km		Location
Service routes		Station No.	English	Chinese	Transfer	Distance km		Location
		1001	Luomashi	骡马市	1 4 18			Qingyang
		1002	People's Park	人民公园	2 17			Qingyang
		1003	Wenwengshishi	文翁石室	13			Qingyang
●	●	1004	Wuhou Shrine	武侯祠				Wuhou
●	●	1005	Gaoshengqiao	高升桥	3 5			Wuhou
●	●	1006	Hongpailou	红牌楼	3			Wuhou
●	●	1007	Taipingyuan	太平园	3 7	0.00	0.00	Wuhou
●	●	1008	Cujin	簇锦		1.980	1.980	Wuhou
●	●	1009	Huaxing	华兴	9	1.584	3.564	Wuhou
●	●	1010	Jinhua	金花		3.575	7.139	Wuhou
●	●	1011	Shuangliu International Airport Terminal 1	双流机场1航站楼	CTU	1.837	8.976	Shuangliu
●	●	1012	Shuangliu International Airport Terminal 2	双流机场2航站楼	19 30 (Note: Out-of-system interchange via East of Terminal 2 of Shuangliu International Airport); CTU IPW	1.001	9.977	Shuangliu
●	●	1013	Shuangliu West Railway Station	双流西站	3	5.099	15.076	Shuangliu
●	●	1014	Yingtian Temple	应天寺		1.494	16.570	Shuangliu
●	●	1015	Huangshui	黄水		2.346	18.916	Shuangliu
●	●	1016	Huayuan	花源		3.671	22.587	Xinjin
●	●	1017	Xinjin Station	新津站	Xinjin (IRW); Chenggui HSR	2.597	25.184	Xinjin
●	●	1018	Huaqiao	花桥		2.824	28.008	Xinjin
●		1019	Wujin	五津		5.019	33.027	Xinjin
●		1020	Rulin Road	儒林路		1.250	34.277	Xinjin
●		1021	Liujianian	刘家碾		1.220	35.497	Xinjin
●		1022	Xinping	新平		1.252	36.749	Xinjin
