= Liujianian station =

Metro station in Chengdu, China

Liujianian 刘家碾
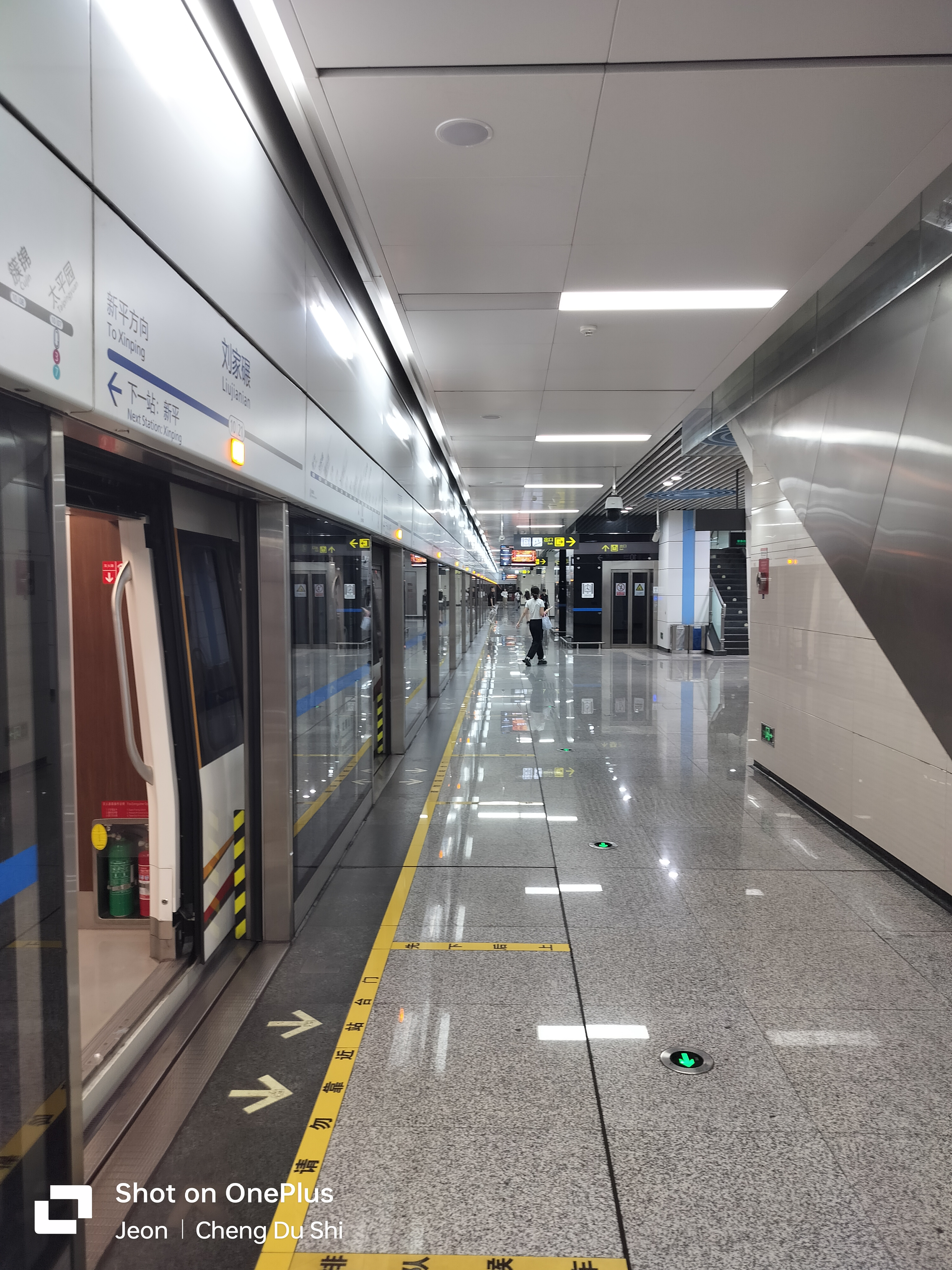

General information
- Location: Xinjin District, Chengdu, Sichuan; China
- Operator: Chengdu Metro Limited
- Line: Line 10
- Platforms: 2 (1 island platform)

Other information
- Station code: 1021

History
- Opened: 27 December 2019

Services
Preceding station	Chengdu Metro	Following station
Rulin Road towards Wuhou Shrine	Line 10	Xinping (Baodun) towards Xinping
Location

Liujianian (Chinese: 刘家碾) is a station on Line 10 of the Chengdu Metro in China. It opened on 27 December 2019.
