= Huayuan station (Chengdu Metro) =

Metro station in Chengdu, China

Huayuan 花源
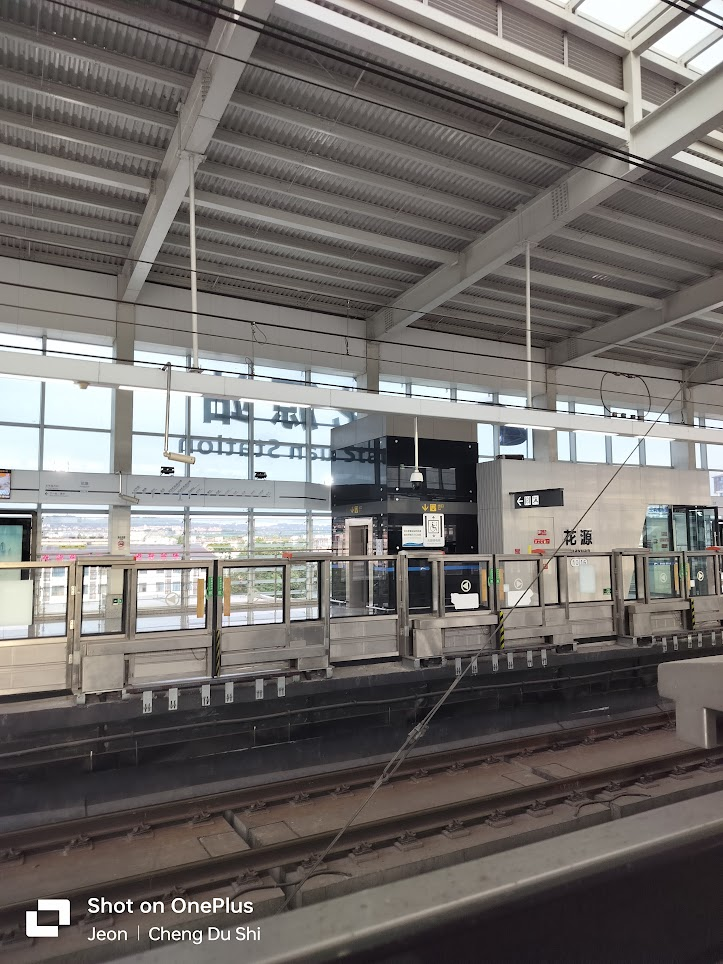

General information
- Location: Xinjin District, Chengdu, Sichuan; China
- Coordinates: 30°29′17″N 103°52′44″E
- Operated by: Chengdu Metro Limited
- Line: Line 10
- Platforms: 2 (2 side platforms)

Other information
- Station code: 1016

History
- Opened: 27 December 2019

Services
Preceding station	Chengdu Metro	Following station
Huangshui towards Wuhou Shrine	Line 10	Xinjin Railway Station towards Xinping
Location

Huayuan (Chinese: 花源) is a station on Line 10 of the Chengdu Metro in China. It was opened on 27 December 2019.
