= Taipingyuan station =

Chengdu Metro station

Taipingyuan 太平园
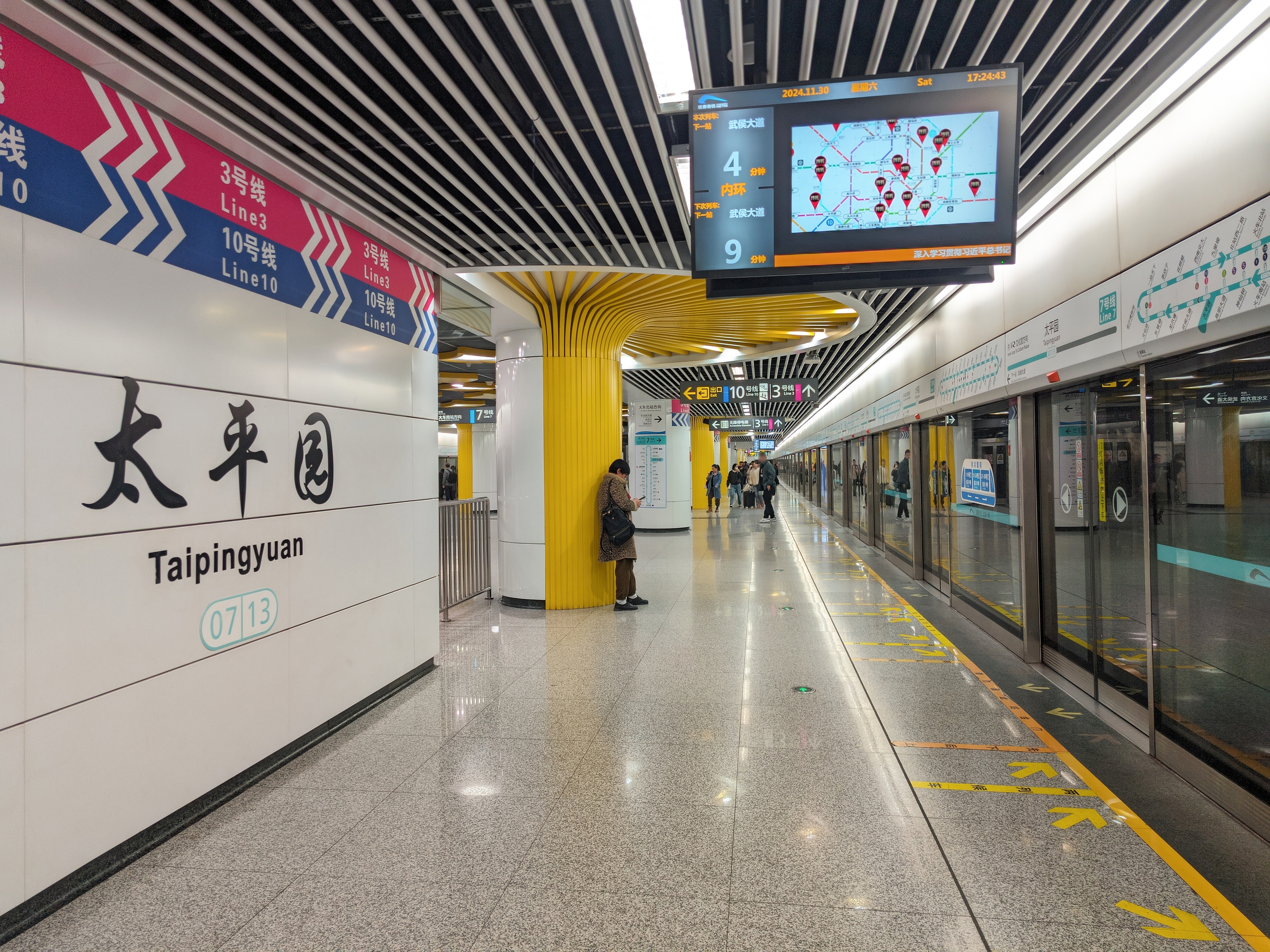

General information
- Location: Wuhou District, Chengdu, Sichuan; China
- Coordinates: 30.6249°N 104.0161°E
- Operated by: Chengdu Metro Limited
- Lines: Line 3 Line 7 Line 10
- Platforms: 7 (3 island platforms, 1 side platform)

Other information
- Station code: 0326 0713 1007

History
- Opened: 31 July 2016

Services
Preceding station	Chengdu Metro	Following station
Hongpailou towards Chengdu Medical College	Line 3	Chuanzang Flyover towards Shuangliu West Railway Station
Wuhou Avenue Clockwise	Line 7	Gaopeng Avenue Anticlockwise
Hongpailou towards Wuhou Shrine	Line 10	Cujin towards Xinping
Location

Taipingyuan (Chinese: 太平园) is a transfer station on Line 3, Line 7 and Line 10 of the Chengdu Metro in China.

== Station layout ==
G	Entrances and Exits	Exits A-F
B1	Concourse	Faregates, Station Agent
B2	Side platform, doors open on the right
B2	Southbound	Line 10 towards Xinping (Cujin) →
B2	Northbound	← Line 10 towards Wuhou Shrine (Hongpailou)
B2	Island platform, doors open on the left/right
B2	Northbound	← Line 3 towards Chengdu Medical College (Hongpailou)
B2	Island platform, doors open on the left
B2	Southbound	Line 3 towards Shuangliu West Railway Station (Chuanzang Flyover) →
B3	Clockwise	← Line 7 to Wuhou Avenue
B3	Island platform, doors open on the left
B3	Counterclockwise	Line 7 to Gaopeng Avenue →

== Gallery ==
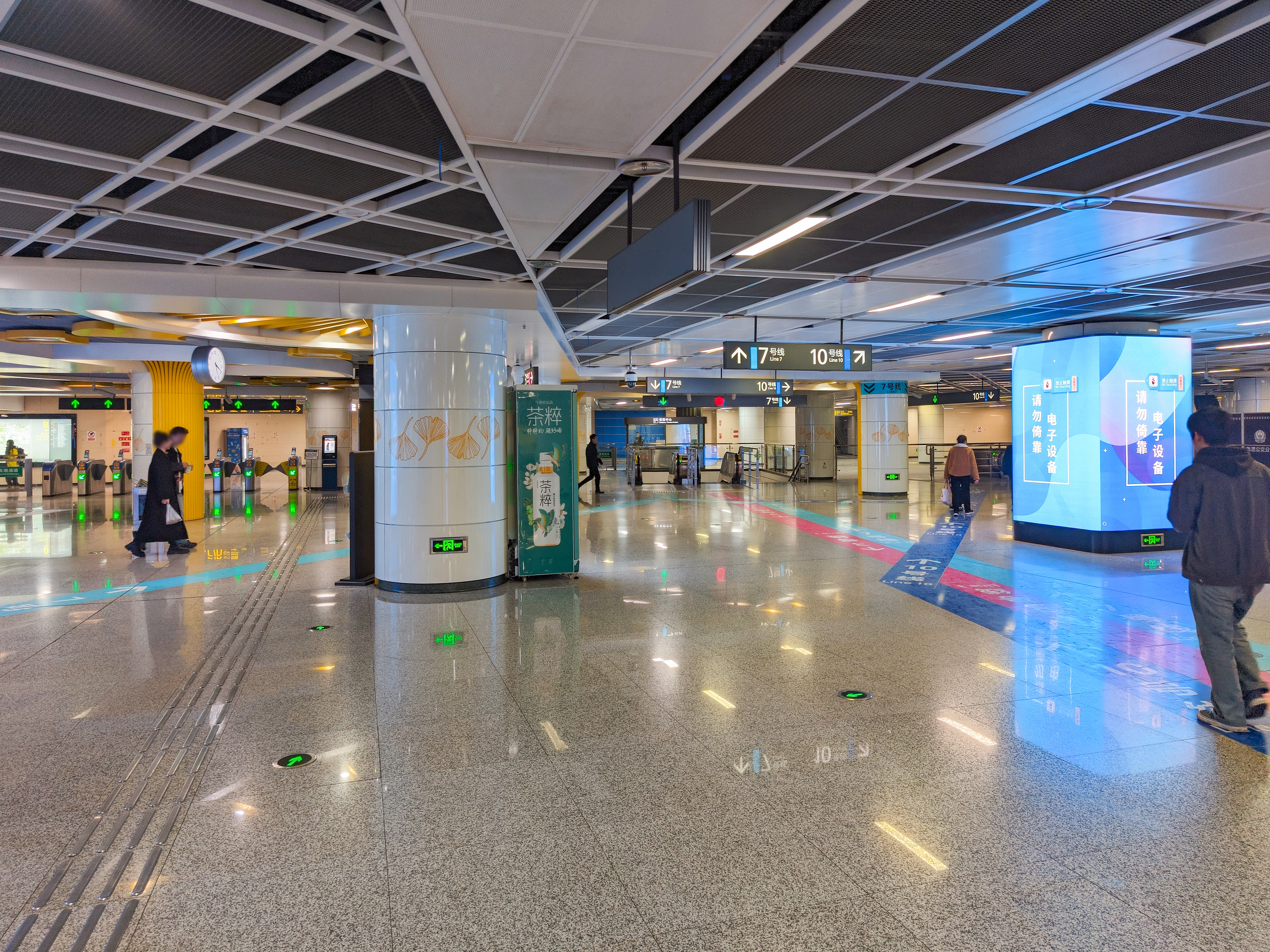
Concourse

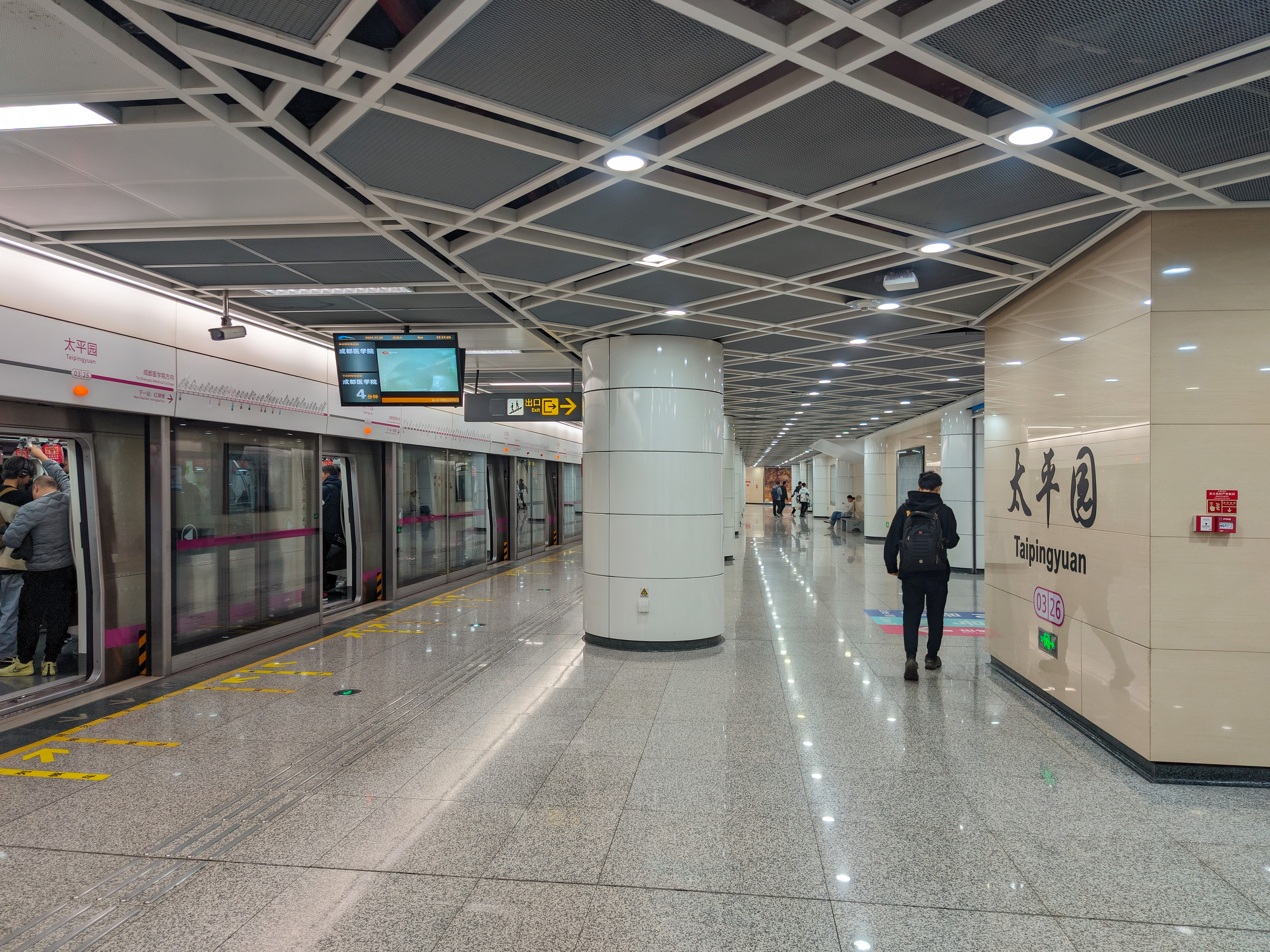
Line 3 platform

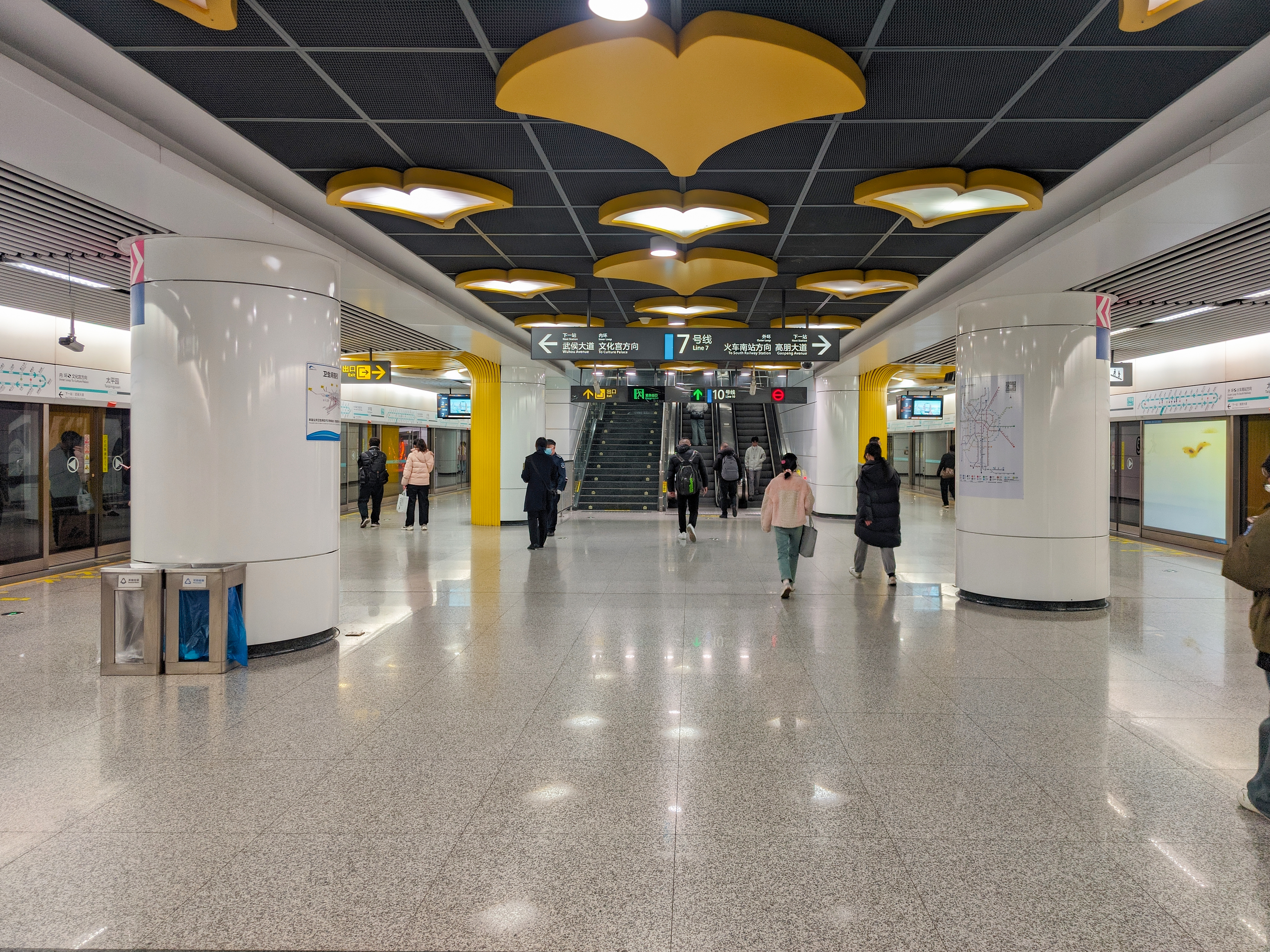
Line 7 platform

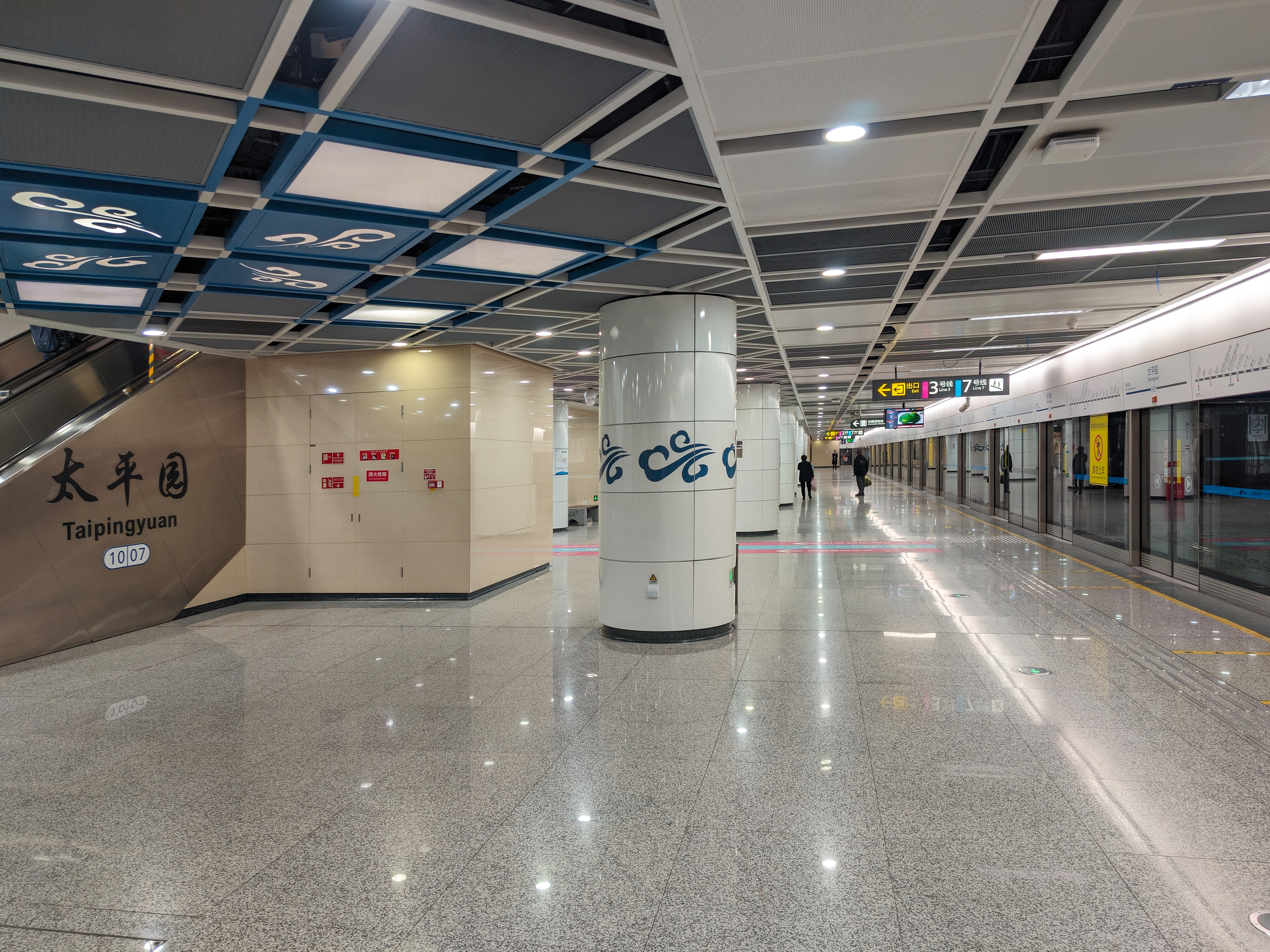
Line 10 platform
