= Xinping station =

Metro station in Chengdu, China

Xinping 新平
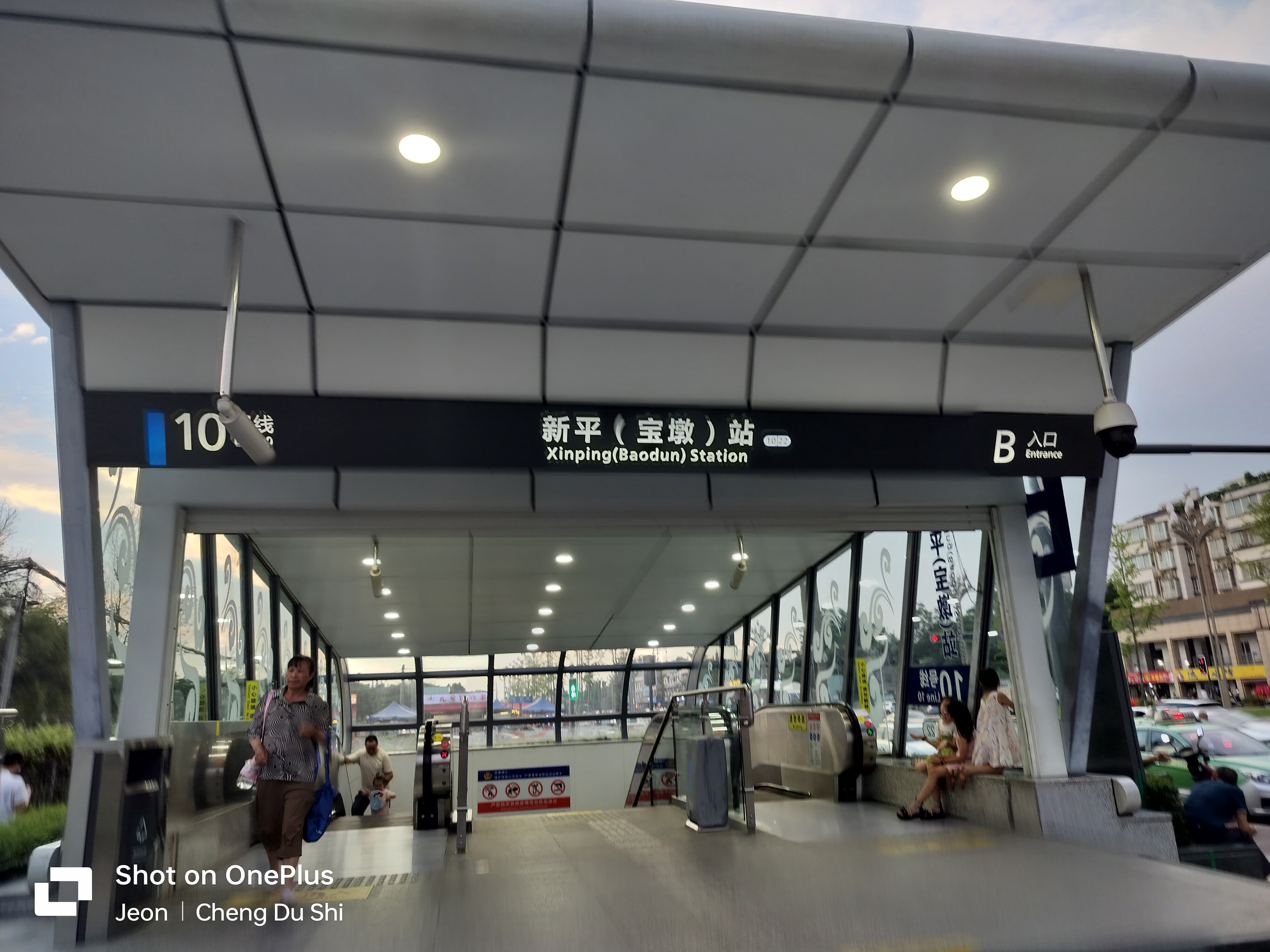
- Entrance B

General information
- Other names: Xinping (Baodun) Station (Chinese: 新平（宝墩）站)
- Location: Baodun Town, Xinjin District, Chengdu, Sichuan; China
- Coordinates: 30.41117°N 103.77939°E
- Operated by: Chengdu Metro Limited
- Line: Line 10
- Platforms: 2 (2 side platforms)

Other information
- Station code: 1022

History
- Opened: 27 December 2019

Services
Preceding station	Chengdu Metro	Following station
Liujianian towards Wuhou Shrine	Line 10	Terminus
Location

Xinping station (Chinese: 新平站) is a station on Line 10 of the Chengdu Metro in China. It was opened on 27 December 2019 and it is the southern terminus of Line 10. For some years after the station opened, it added the sub name Baodun (Chinese: 宝墩), because of its location in the Baodun Town in Xinjin District. But it is just being used in this station, the route map didn't change.

== Gallery ==
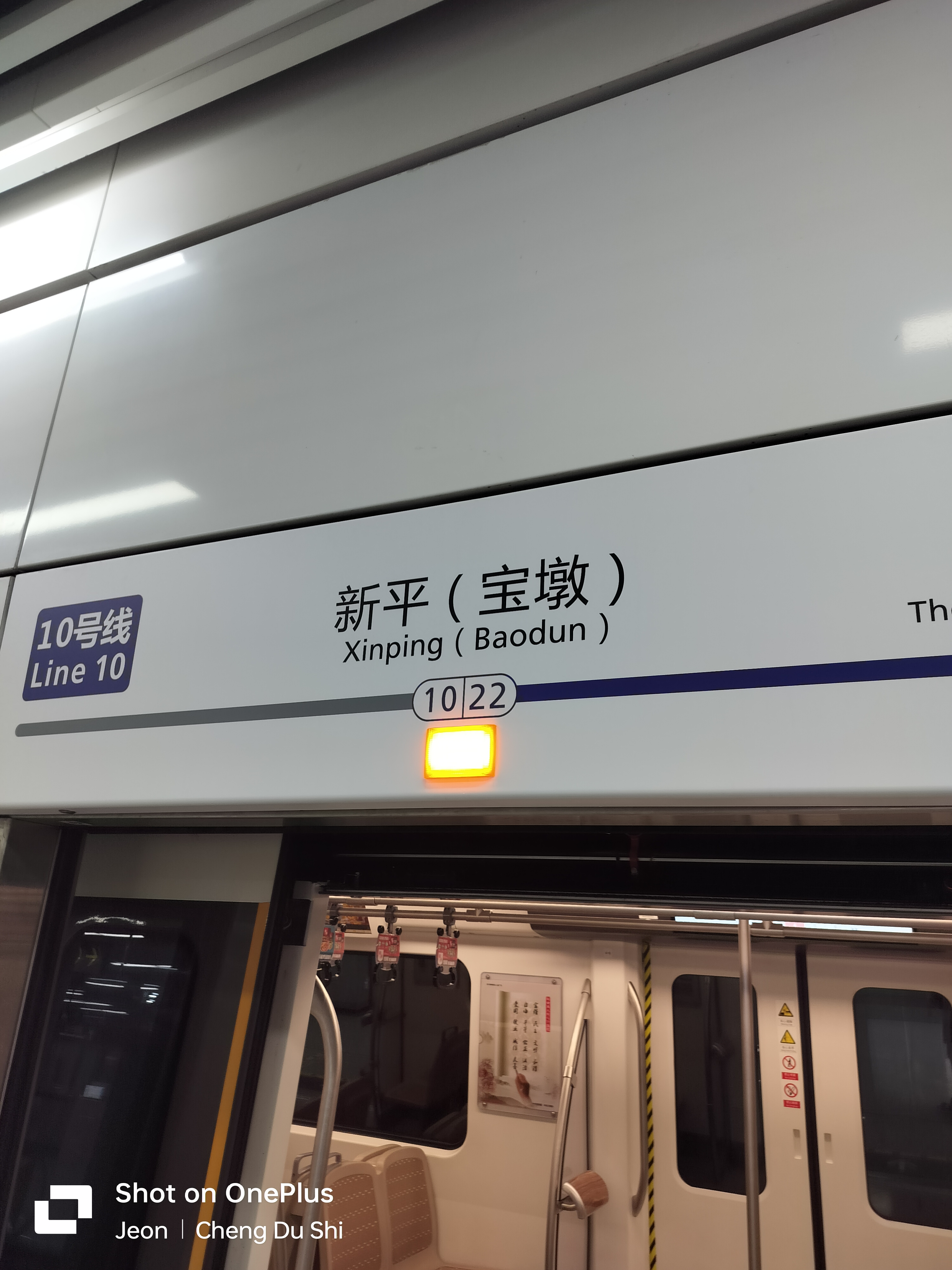
Station name

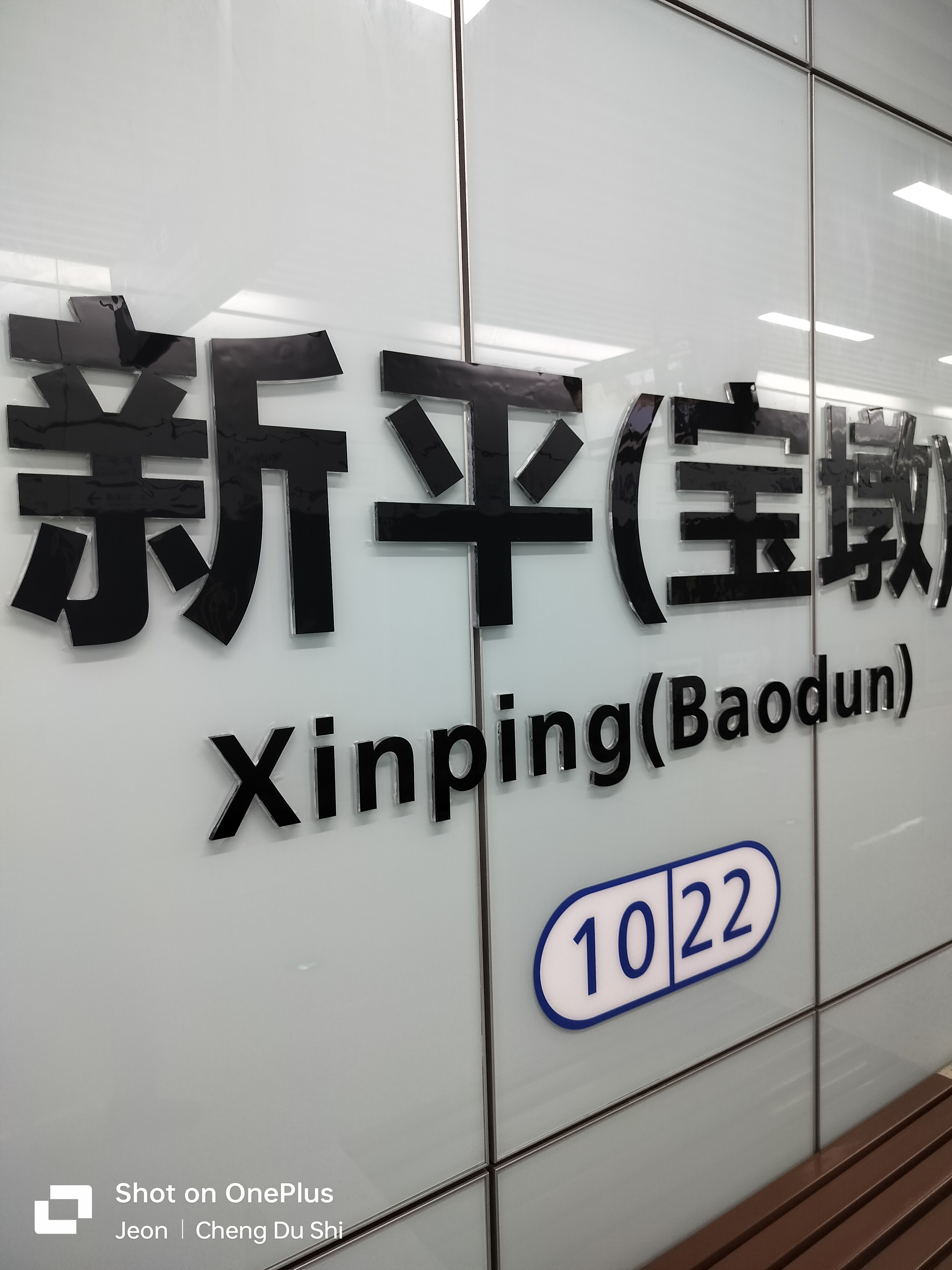
Station name

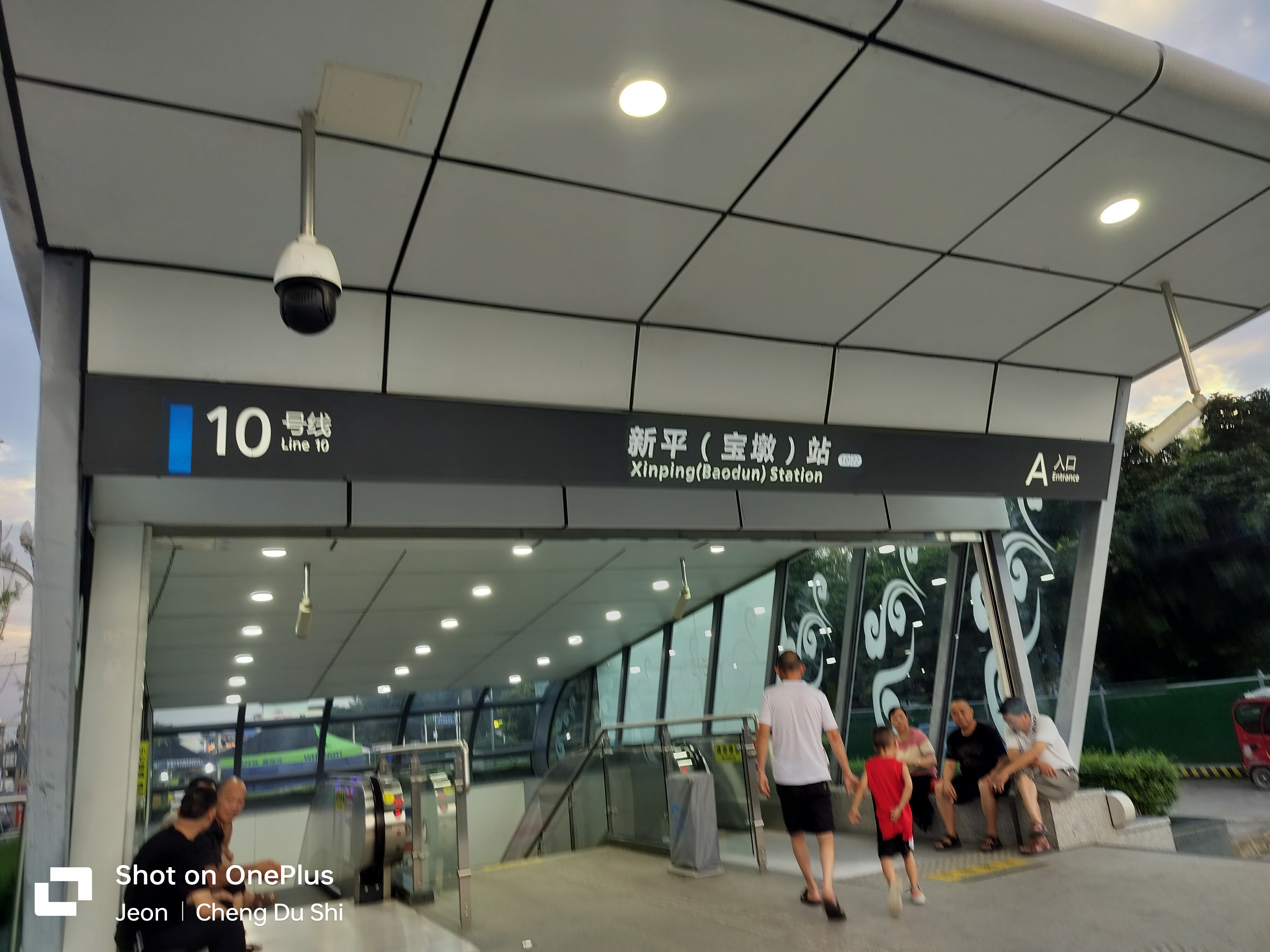
Exit A
