= Yixin Lake station =

Metro station in Chengdu, China

Coordinates: 30.4730°N 104.0245°E

Yixin Lake 怡心湖

General information
- Location: Tianfu New Area, Chengdu, Sichuan; China
- Operated by: Chengdu Metro Limited
- Line(s): Line 5 Line 19
- Platforms: 4 (2 island platforms)

Other information
- Station code: 0539 1913

History
- Opened: 27 December 2019

Services
Preceding station	Chengdu Metro	Following station
Nanhu Flyover towards Huagui Road	Line 5	Longma Road towards Huilong
Muhua Road towards Jinxing	Line 19	Zhengxingwan towards Tianfu Station

Yixin Lake (Chinese: 怡心湖) is a station on Line 5 and Line 19 of the Chengdu Metro in China. It was opened on 27 December 2019.
