= Erjiang Temple station =

Metro station in Chengdu, China

Erjiang Temple 二江寺

General information
- Location: Tianfu New Area, Chengdu, Sichuan; China
- Coordinates: 30.5022°N 104.0333°E
- Operated by: Chengdu Metro Limited
- Line: Line 5
- Platforms: 2 (1 island platform)

Other information
- Station code: 0537

History
- Opened: 27 December 2019

Services
Preceding station	Chengdu Metro	Following station
The Police College towards Huagui Road	Line 5	Nanhu Flyover towards Huilong
Location

Erjiang Temple (Chinese: 二江寺) is a station on Line 5 of the Chengdu Metro in China. It was opened on 27 December 2019.
