= The Police College station =

Chengdu Metro station

The Police College 警官学院

General information
- Location: Tianfu New Area, Chengdu, Sichuan; China
- Operated by: Chengdu Metro Limited
- Line: Line 5
- Platforms: 2 (1 island platform)

Other information
- Station code: 0536

History
- Opened: 27 December 2019

Services
Preceding station	Chengdu Metro	Following station
Qilong towards Huagui Road	Line 5	Erjiang Temple towards Huilong
Location

The Police College (Chinese: 警官学院) is a station on Line 5 of the Chengdu Metro in China. It was opened on 27 December 2019.
