= Qilong station =

Qilong station can refer to:

- Qilong station (Chengdu Metro), a metro station in Chengdu, China
- Qilong station (Chongqing Rail Transit), a metro station in Chongqing, China
