= Minle station (Chengdu Metro) =

Metro station in Chengdu, China

Minle 民乐

General information
- Location: High-Tech Zone, Chengdu, Sichuan; China
- Operated by: Chengdu Metro Limited
- Line: Line 5
- Platforms: 2 (1 island platform)

Other information
- Station code: 0534

History
- Opened: 27 December 2019

Services
Preceding station	Chengdu Metro	Following station
Dayuan towards Huagui Road	Line 5	Qilong towards Huilong
Location

Minle (Chinese: 民乐) is a station on Line 5 of the Chengdu Metro in China. It was opened on 27 December 2019.
