= Line 19 (Chengdu Metro) =

Rapid transit line in Chengdu, China

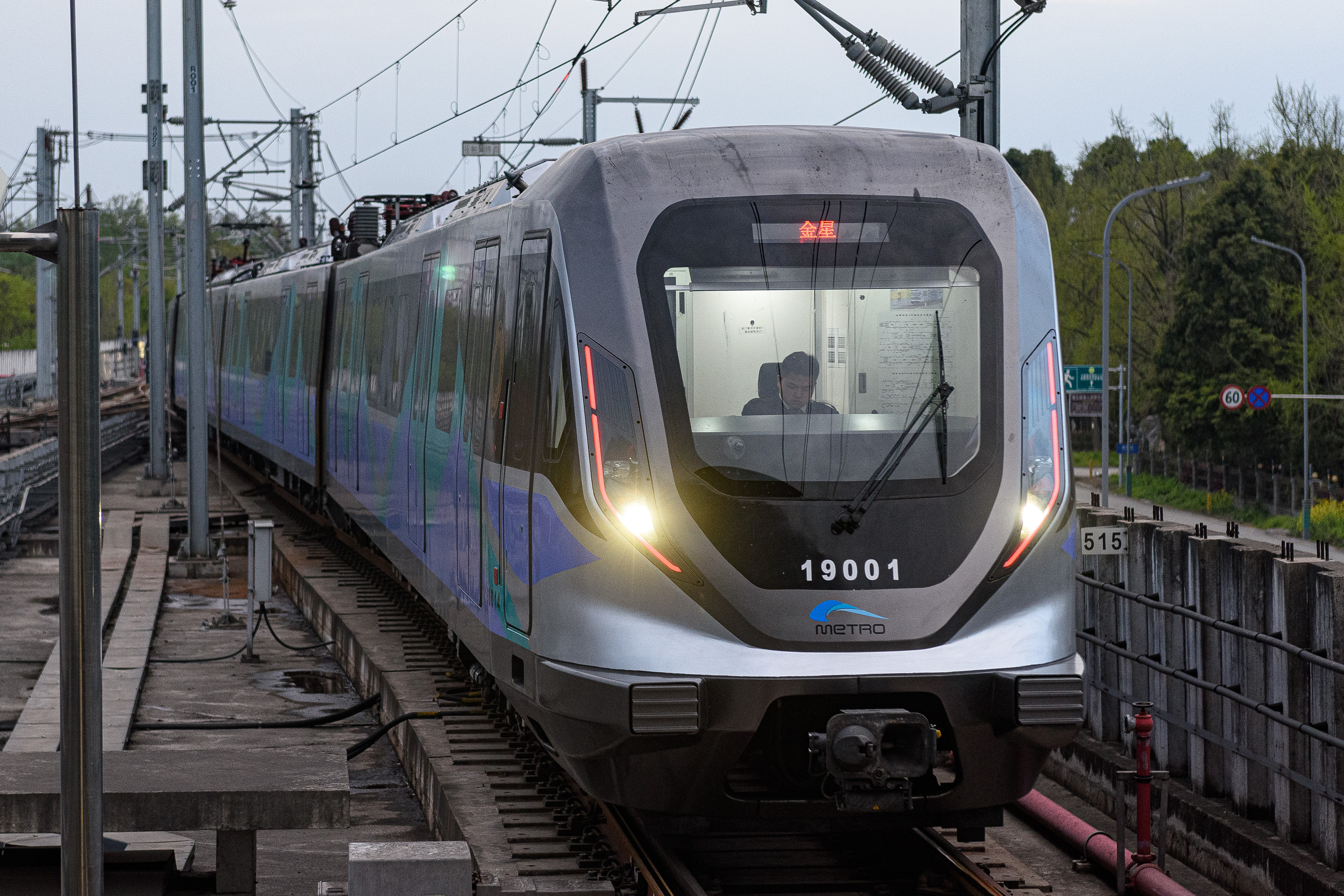
- A Line 19 train at Jinxing station

Overview
- Status: Operational
- Owner: City of Chengdu
- Locale: Chengdu, Sichuan
- Termini: Jinxing; Tianfu Station
- Stations: 18

Service
- Type: Rapid transit
- System: Chengdu Metro
- Operator(s): Chengdu Metro Corporation
- Depot(s): Yongyi Depot (永义车辆段); Wutongmiao Depot (五桐庙停车场); Changshuncun Depot (长顺村停车场)

History
- Opened: 18 December 2020; 5 years ago

Technical
- Line length: 63.31 km (39.3 mi)
- Number of tracks: 2
- Character: underground, some elevated
- Track gauge: 1435
- Electrification: overhead lines, 25,000 V AC
- Operating speed: 140km/h

Line 19 of the Chengdu Metro is a metro line in Chengdu. The whole line is 62.69 km. The line uses 8-car Type-A trains operating up to 140 km/h speed powered by 25kV AC overhead lines.

It was opened in 18 December 2020 as a part of Line 17 Phase 1. On September 17, 2023, original Line 17 Phase 1: (Jinxing - Jitouqiao) splits into Line 19 Phase 1: (Jinxing - Jiujiang North) and new Line 17: (Jiujiang North - Jitouqiao), and 4-Car A-Train starts operation on Line 17. All passengers must transfer at the same platform at Jiujiang North between line 17 and line 19.

Line 19 Phase 2 will have local and express services. It will connect Chengdu Tianfu International Airport and Chengdu Shuangliu International Airport with direct express service. Phase 2 has opened on 28 November 2023, of which Tianfu station will only provide interchange with line 18, and will be fully open when Tianfu railway station of China Railway opens.

== Stations ==
Service routes			Station №	Station name		Transfer	Distance km		Location
Service routes			Station №	English	Chinese	Transfer	Distance km		Location
●	●		1901	Jinxing	金星		——	0	Wenjiang
●	●		1902	Huangshi	黄石		4.442	4.442	Wenjiang
●	●		1903	Chengdu Fifth People's Hospital	市五医院		2.935	7.377	Wenjiang
●	●		1904	Fengxihe	凤溪河	4	1.858	9.235	Wenjiang
●	●		1905	Wenquan Avenue	温泉大道		2.084	11.319	Wenjiang
●	●		1906	Mingguang	明光		1.784	13.103	Wenjiang
●	●		1907	Jiujiang North	九江北	17	6.721	19.824	Shuangliu
●	●		1908	Longqiao Road	龙桥路	3	4.477	24.301	Shuangliu
●	●	●	1909	East of Terminal 2 of Shuangliu International Airport	双流机场2航站楼东	30; 10 (Note: Out-of-system interchange via Terminal 2 of Shuangliu International Airport); IPW CTU	5.604	29.905	Shuangliu
●	●	｜	1910	Longgang	龙港	8	4.643	34.548	Shuangliu
●	●	｜	1911	Wenjiashan	温家山		5.840	40.388	Shuangliu
●	●	｜	1912	Muhua Road	牧华路		1.457	41.845	Shuangliu
●	●	｜	1913	Yixin Lake	怡心湖	5	2.180	44.025	Tianfu New Area
●	●	｜	1914	Zhengxingwan	正兴湾		2.696	46.721	Tianfu New Area
●	●	｜	1915	Honglian	红莲	S5	3.318	50.039	Tianfu New Area
●	●	｜	1916	Tianfu Commercial District	天府商务区	6	2.386	52.425	Tianfu New Area
●	●	｜	1917	Lanjiadian	蓝家店		2.606	55.031	Tianfu New Area
●	●	｜	1918	Tianfu Station (Note: Only interchange between Lines 18 and 19 available, no entrances and exits at the moment.)	天府站	18; Tianfu (U/C)	5.108	60.139	Tianfu New Area
	↓	↓	Through-service to/from Tianfu International Airport North/Terminal 1 & 2 of Tianfu International Airport of Line 18						
			1919	Hejiang (Note: Hejiang station is a long-term reserved station and not operational at the moment.)	合江		2.414	62.553	Tianfu New Area
