= Chengdu North railway station =

Railway station in Chengdu, China

Chengdu North 成都北
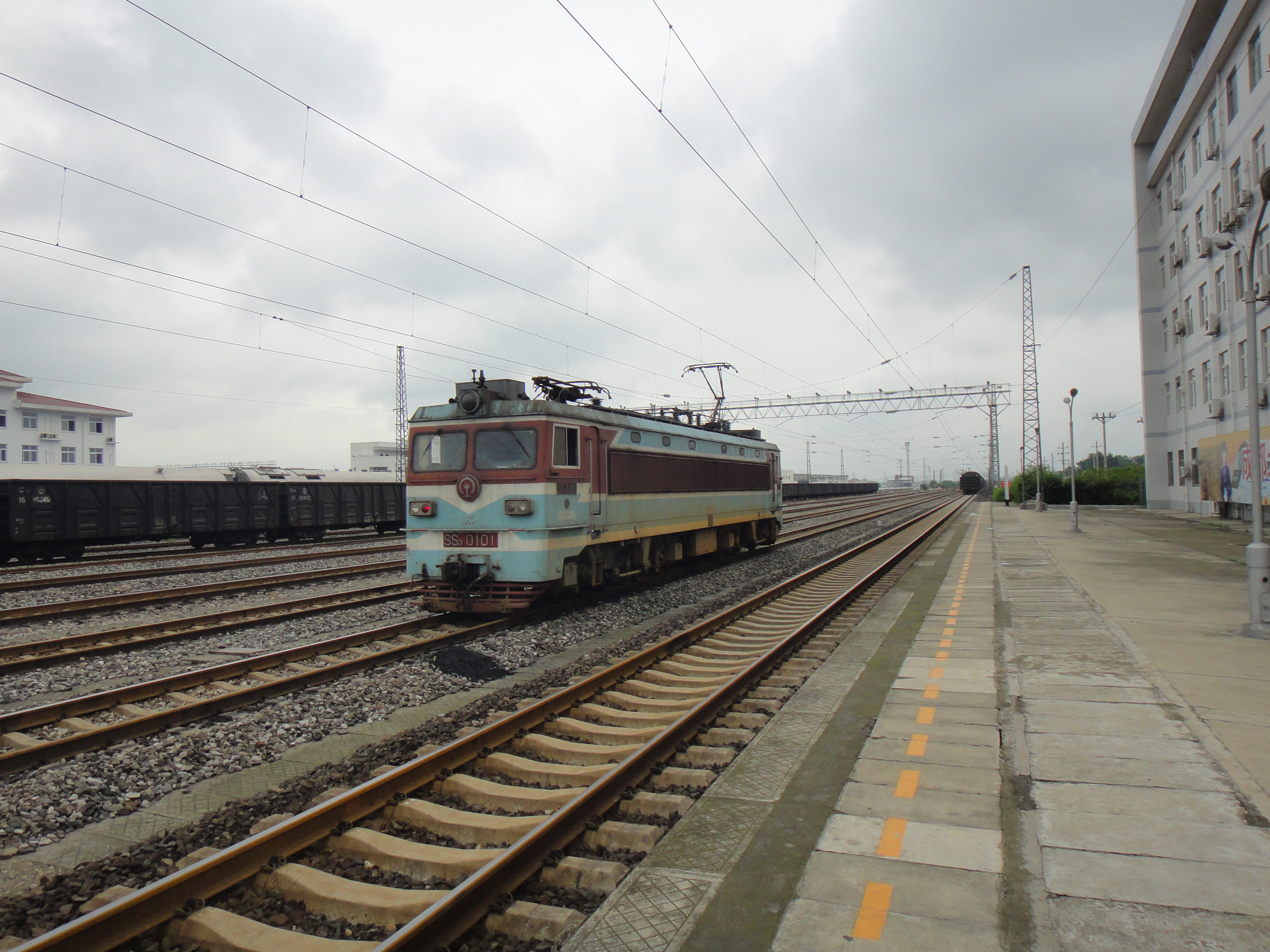

General information
- Location: 30.7623°N 104.2286°E; Xindu District, Chengdu, Sichuan; China
- Operated by: China Railway Chengdu Group, China Railway Corporation
- Line(s): Baoji–Chengdu railway, Dazhou–Chengdu railway

Construction
- Structure type: Classification yard

History
- Opened: 2007

Chengdu North railway station (Chinese: 成都北站; pinyin: Chéngdūběi Zhàn) is a classification yard in Xindu District, Chengdu, Sichuan, China. It covers an area of 287,000 square meters. It is the largest classification yard in the Southwest China.

== History ==
It opened on April 18, 2007.

== See also ==
It should not be confused with North railway station on the Chengdu Metro situated underneath Chengdu railway station, which is also commonly called "North railway station" by locals.

== See also ==
- Chengdu railway station
