= Qilong station (Chengdu Metro) =

Metro station in Chengdu, China

Qilong 骑龙

General information
- Location: Tianfu New Area, Chengdu, Sichuan; China
- Coordinates: 30.52694°N 104.04176°E
- Operated by: Chengdu Metro Limited
- Line: Line 5
- Platforms: 2 (1 island platform)

Other information
- Station code: 0535

History
- Opened: 27 December 2019

Services
Preceding station	Chengdu Metro	Following station
Minle towards Huagui Road	Line 5	The Police College towards Huilong
Location

Qilong (Chinese: 骑龙) is a station on Line 5 of the Chengdu Metro in China. It was opened on 27 December 2019.
