= Jitouqiao station =

Metro station in Chengdu, China

Jitouqiao 机投桥
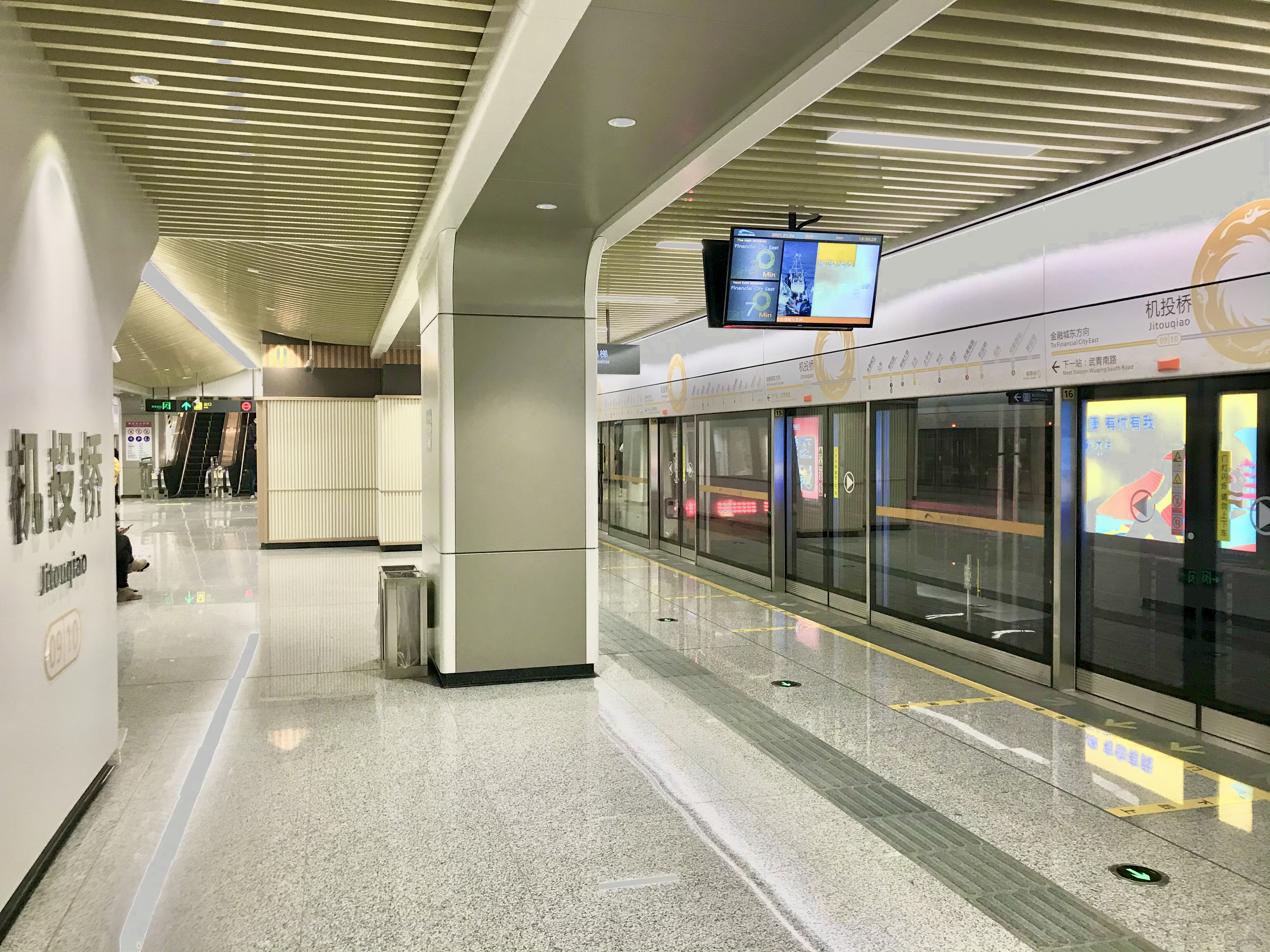
- Platforms of Line 9

General information
- Location: Wuqing Road North & Wuqing Road South × Yongkang Road; Wuhou District, Chengdu, Sichuan; China
- Coordinates: 30.6475°N 103.97579°E
- System: Chengdu metro station
- Operator: Chengdu Metro Limited
- Lines: Line 9; Line 17
- Platforms: 4 (2 island platforms)

Construction
- Structure type: Underground
- Accessible: Yes

Other information
- Station code: 0910 1719

History
- Opened: 18 December 2020; 5 years ago

Services
Preceding station	Chengdu Metro	Following station
Wuqing South Road towards Financial City East	Line 9	Peifeng towards Huangtianba
Baifoqiao towards Jiujiang North	Line 17	Yanggongqiao towards Gaohong
Location

Jitouqiao (simplified Chinese: 机投桥; traditional Chinese: 機投橋) is a Interchange station on Line 9 and Line 17 of the Chengdu Metro in China. It is located in the Wuhou District of Chengdu. The station was opened on 18 December 2020. The station code of Line 17 was changed from 1709 to 1719 because the section between Jinxing to Jiujiang North was allocated to Line 19.

== Station layout ==
Jitouqiao has three levels: a concourse, and separate levels for lines 9 and 17. Basement 2 is for line 17, and basement 3 is for line 9. Each of these consists of an island platform with two tracks.

== Entrances/exits ==
- C: Yongkang Road, Wuqing Road South, Chaoyin Road
- D: Yongkang Road, Caojin Road South, Jitou Main Street
- E: Wuqing Road North, Wan'an Main Street
- F: Wuqing Road North, Xinlyu Road
- G: Yongkang Road, 3rd Jiukang Road, 5th Jiukang Road
