= Line 17 (Chengdu Metro) =

Rapid transit line in Chengdu, China

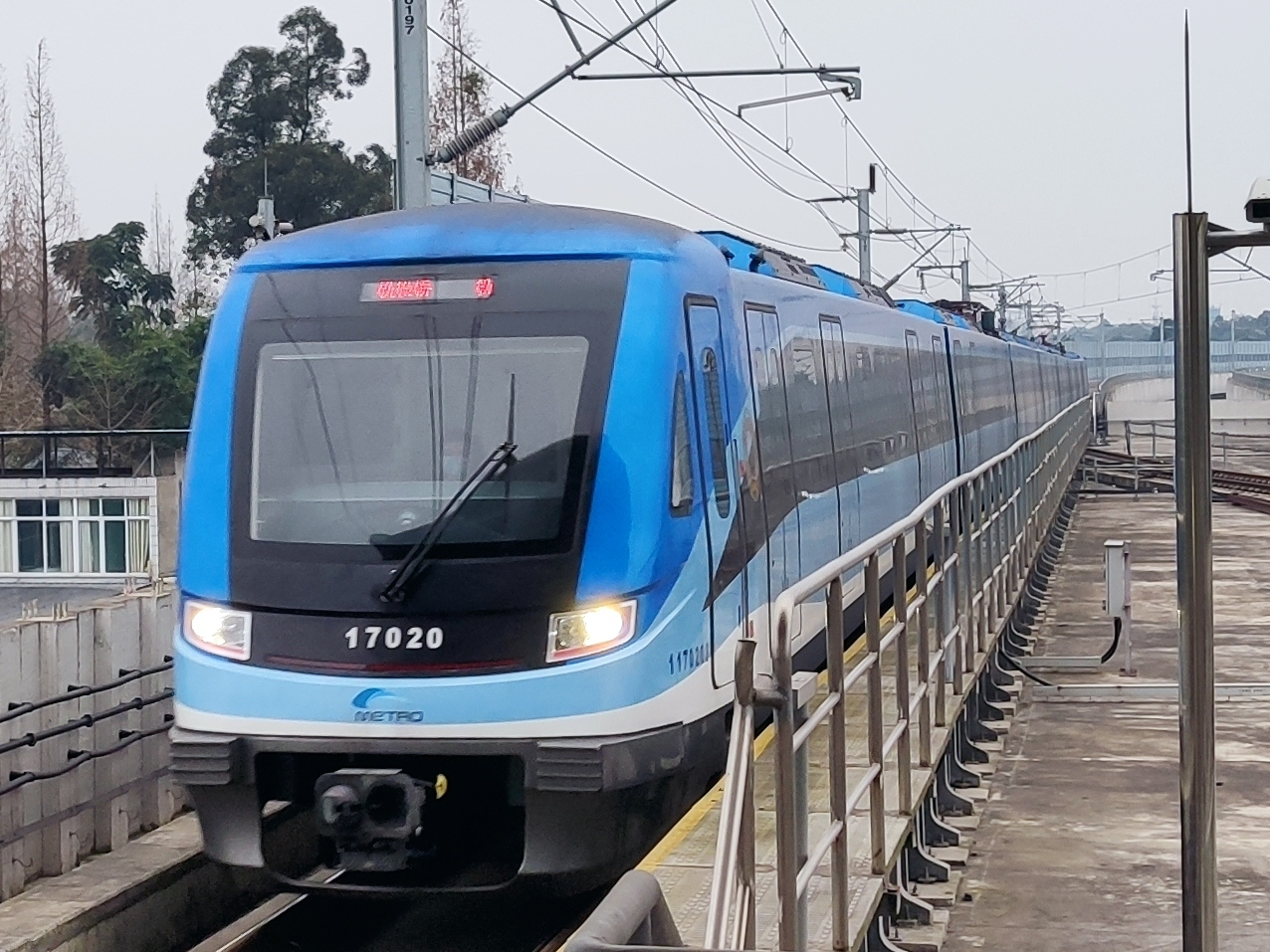
- Line 17 train entering Huangshi station, in which has transferred to Line 19

Overview
- Status: Operational
- Owner: City of Chengdu
- Locale: Chengdu, Sichuan
- Termini: Jiujiang North; Gaohong
- Stations: 21

Service
- Type: Rapid transit
- System: Chengdu Metro
- Operator: Chengdu Metro Corporation
- Depot: Wutongmiao Depot (五桐庙停车场)

History
- Opened: 18 December 2020; 5 years ago

Technical
- Line length: 31.47 km (19.6 mi)
- Number of tracks: 2
- Character: underground
- Track gauge: 1,435 mm (4 ft 8 1/2 in) standard gauge
- Electrification: Overhead line, 25 kV 50 Hz AC
- Operating speed: 140 km/h

Line 17 of the Chengdu Metro is a metro line in Chengdu. The whole line is 30.286 km when Phase 2 opens. The line uses 8-car Type-A trains operating up to 140 km/h speed powered by 25kV AC overhead lines.

Phase 1 runs from Jinxing station in Wenjiang District to Jitouqiao station in Wuhou District. Phase 1 is 26.145 km long with 5.5 km running elevated and 20.6 km running underground. There are 9 stations with 2 elevated stations and 7 underground stations.

Phase 2, opened on September 17th 2025, extended the line west across central Chengdu to Gaohong station. It is 24.8 km long, all underground with 18 additional stations.

== Progress ==
- On February 23, 2017, Sichuan Development and Reform Commission approved Line 17 Phase 1.
- On February 27, 2017, Line 17 Phase 1 started construction.
- On November 11, 2017, the first tunnel boring machine started digging section between Jiujiang North and Baifoqiao Stations.
- On March 24, 2019, Line 17 phase 1 elevated section was completed.
- On April 9, 2019, Huangshi－Chengdu Fifth People's Hospital, Mingguang－#1 Vent Tunnel sections are completed.
- On August 5, 2019, main structures of all stations on Line 17 was completed.
- On January 7, 2020, Line 17 Phase 2's Beimenqiao Station started excavation, marking the start of station construction for Phase 2.
- On March 25, 2020, Line 17 Phase 1 finished track-laying.
- On June 19, 2020, Chengdu Metro started 3-month trial operation for Line 17.
- On June 24, 2020, Construction finished for Wutongmiao Depot (五桐庙停车场) for Line 17.
- On December 18, 2020, Line 17 from Jinxing station to Jitouqiao station was opened.
- On October 20, 2022, 16:40, Line 17 Phase 2's Longzhuayan - Qingshuihedaqiao section finished both tunnel construction. This section is 369.602m long.
- On February 12, 2023, Line 19 Phase 2 is officially powered on.
- On February 21, 2023, Line 19 Phase 2 signal and communication system started operational testing in Xinmiao Control Centre (新苗控制中心), and Phase 2 signal now synchronizes with Phase 1.
- On February 22, 2023, Line 17 Phase 2 finished Jinxing station's main power centre's land clearance.
- On March 20, 2023, Line 19's Changshuncun Depot (长顺村停车场) is handover to operation.
- On March 28, 2023, Line 19 Phase 2 finished 160 km/h high-speed train testing, entering 1–2 months of systematic testing.
- On March 28, 2023, Chengdu Rail Transit 2023 Annal Media Gala was held in Wenjiashan Station of Line 19.
- On March 30, 2023, Line 19 Phase 2 finished construction and handover to operation team for operational testing.
- On May 26, 2023, all 45 trains of Line 19 Phase 2 are delivered.
- On September 6, 2023, Chengdu Metro debuted Train Maintenance Bots (车辆巡检机器人), AI-Railway Maintenance Bots (轨道智能巡检机器人), and Power-line Surveillance AI (弓网在线监测装置) on Line 19. This is the first AI-Maintenance Robot & System in the world. Chengdu Metro will implement full AI-Operation by 2025.
- On September 17, 2023, original Line 17 Phase 1: (Jinxing - Jitouqiao) splits into Line 19 Phase 1: (Jinxing - Jiujiang North) and new Line 17: (Jiujiang North - Jitouqiao), and 4-Car A-Train starts operation on Line 17. All passengers must transfer at the same platform at Jiujiang North between line 17 and line 19.
- On September 26, 2023, Line 18 and Line 19 starts co-operational testing.
- On September 30, 2023, Line 17 Phase 2's People's Park station finished structure construction.
- On October 3, 2023, Line 17 Phase 2's Qingshuihedaqiao station to Huanhhali station finished both tunnel construction.
- On 17 September, 2025, Line 17 Phase 2 from Jitouqiao station to Gaohong station was opened.

== Operation ==
=== Opening - September 2023 ===
Line 17 Phase 1 and Line 19 Phase 1 were running in connection as one route.

=== September 2023 - November 2023 ===
Original Line 17 Phase 1: (Jinxing - Jitouqiao) split into Line 19 Phase 1: (Jinxing - Jiujiang North) and new Line 17: (Jiujiang North - Jitouqiao), and 4-Car A-Train starts operation on Line 17. All passengers must transfer at the same platform at Jiujiang North between line 17 and line 19.

=== November 2023 - September 2025 ===
As Line 17 Phase 2 and Line 19 Phase 2 are finished, the operation plan since November 28th is: Line 17 Section：Jiujiang North － Baifoqiao － Jitouqiao

Line 19 Section: Jinxing － Huangshi － Chengdu Fifth People's Hospital－ Fengxihe － Wenquan Avenue － Mingguang － Jiujiang North

=== September 2025 - Now ===
Line 17 Phase 2 and Phase 1 section going to operate together since September 17th, the route is going to operate from Jiujiang North - Jitouqiao - People's Park - Gaohong

== Stations ==
Station №	Station name		Transfer	Distance km		Location
Station №	English	Chinese	Transfer	Distance km		Location
1701	Gaohong	高洪				Chenghua
1702	Weiling	威灵				Chenghua
1703	Hangtian Road	航天路				Chenghua
1704	Renmintang	人民塘				Chenghua
1705	Jichechang	机车厂				Chenghua
1706	Erxianqiao	二仙桥	7			Chenghua
1707	Tashui Bridge	踏水桥				Chenghua
1708	Jianshe North Road	建设北路	6			Chenghua
1709	Hongxing Bridge	红星桥	3			Jinniu
1710	Chenghuangmiao	城隍庙				Jinniu
1711	Xidajie Street	西大街				Qingyang
1712	People's Park	人民公园	2 10			Qingyang
1713	Xiaonan Street	小南街	13			Qingyang
1714	Provincial Orthopaedics Hospital	省骨科医院	5			Qingyang
1715	Huanhua Lane	浣花里				Wuhou
1716	Qingshuihe Bridge	清水河大桥				Wuhou
1717	Longzhuayan	龙爪堰	7			Wuhou
1718	Yanggongqiao	阳公桥				Wuhou
1719	Jitouqiao	机投桥	9	——	0.000	Wuhou
1720	Baifoqiao	白佛桥		1.468	1.468	Wuhou
1721	Jiujiang North	九江北	19	4.179	5.647	Shuangliu
