= Jiujiang North station =

Metro station in Chengdu, China

Jiujiang North 九江北
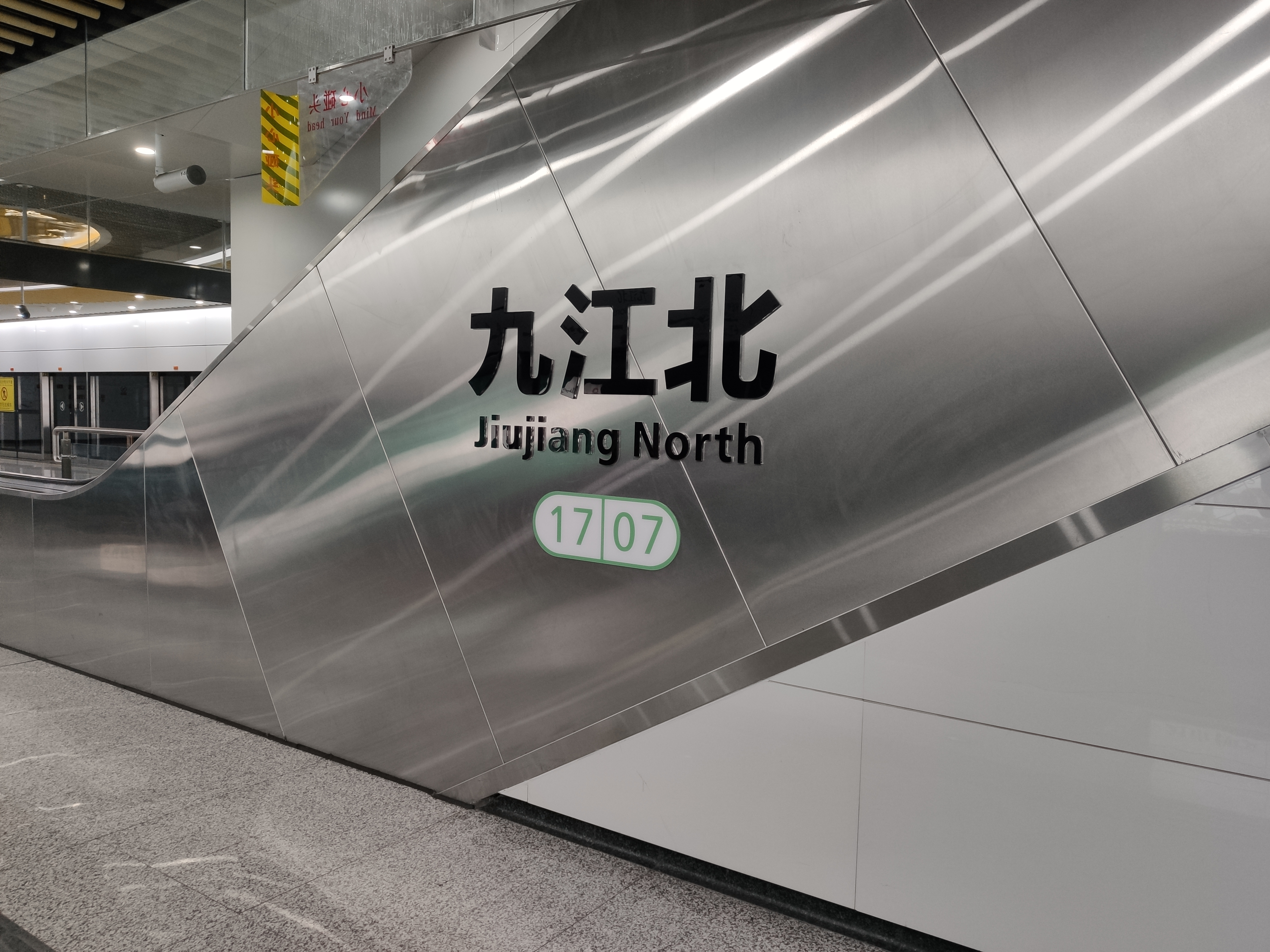
- Station name

General information
- Location: Chengxinpu Expressway × Xingkong Road Section 4 Shuangliu District, Chengdu, Sichuan; China
- Coordinates: 30.6373006°N 103.9195083°E
- System: Chengdu metro station
- Operator: Chengdu Metro Limited
- Lines: Line 17; Line 19
- Platforms: 4 (2 island platforms)

Construction
- Structure type: Underground
- Accessible: Yes

Other information
- Station code: 1721 1907

History
- Opened: 18 December 2020; 5 years ago

Services
Preceding station	Chengdu Metro	Following station
Terminus	Line 17	Baifoqiao towards Gaohong
Mingguang towards Jinxing	Line 19	Longqiao Road towards Tianfu Station
Route map
Location

Jiujiang North (Chinese: 九江北) is a Interchange station on Line 17 and Line 19 of the Chengdu Metro in China. It is located in the Shuangliu District of Chengdu.

== Station layout ==
Jiujiang North has two levels: a concourse, and two island platforms, each one consists of two tracks. A same-direction cross-platform interchange is provided.

G	Ground level	Exits
B1	Concourse	Self-Service Tickets, Customer Service Center
B2		← Line 19 towards Jinxing (Mingguang)
B2	Island Platform, doors will open on the right for Line 17, left for Line 19
B2		← Line 17 termination platform
B2		Line 17 towards Gaohong (Baifoqiao) →
B2	Island Platform, doors will open on the right for Line 17, left for Line 19
B2		Line 19 towards Tianfu International Airport North (Longqiao Road) →

=== Entrances/exits ===
- A: Chengxinpu Avenue
- B: Xingkong Road Section 4, Shiwan Road, Chengxinpu Avenue
- C: Chengxinpu Avenue, Dajing Street South
- D: Chengxinpu Avenue, Jiulong Road, Jiuyang Road

== History ==
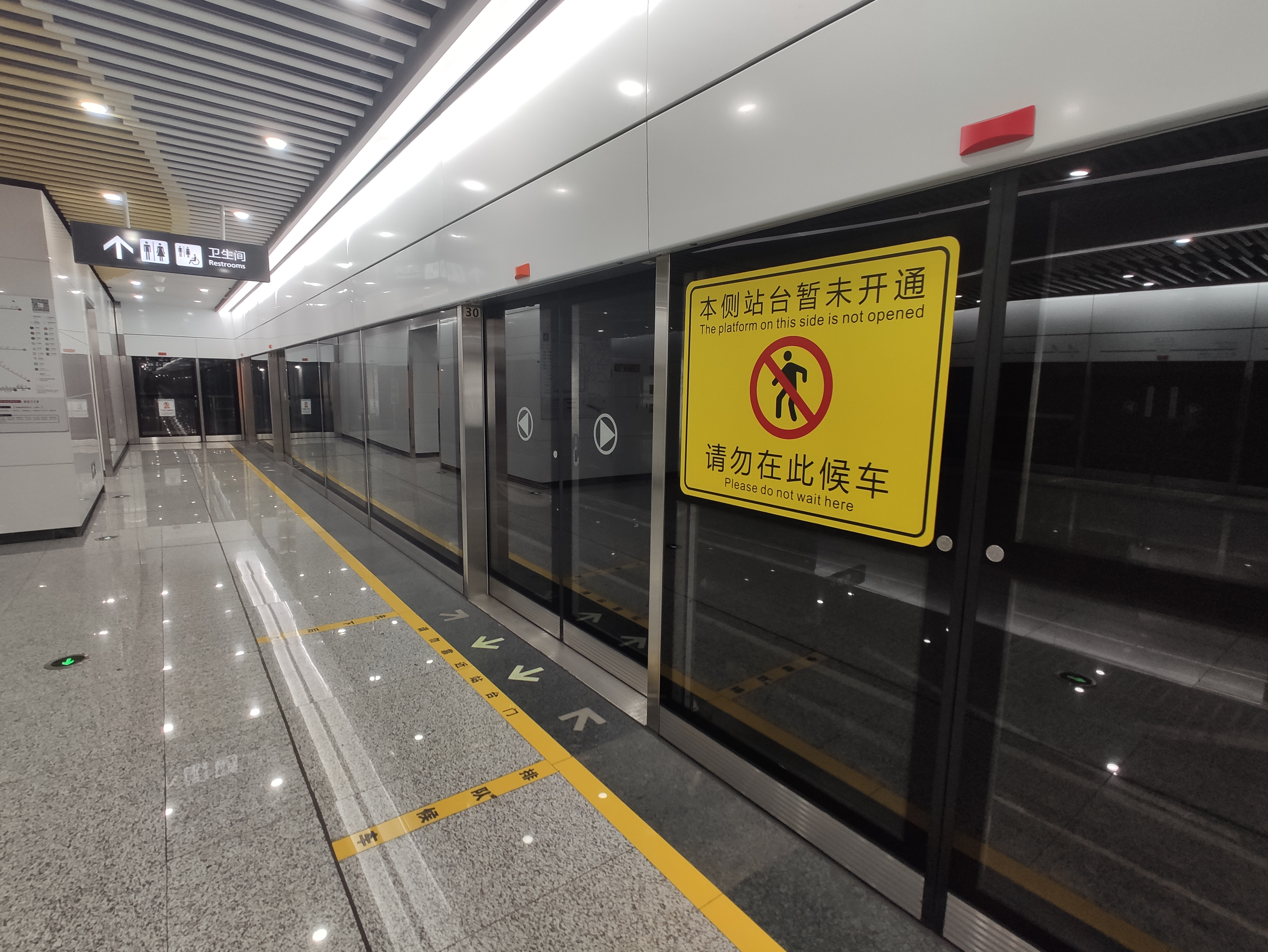
Reserved platform before Line 19 opened

The station began its service on December 18, 2020. The section between Jinxing and Jiujiang North of Line 19 initially services as a part of Line 17. The platforms using are as follows:

B2	Not in service
B2	Island Platform, doors will open on the right
B2	← Line 17 towards Jinxing (Mingguang)
B2	Not in service
B2	Island Platform, doors will open on the left
B2	Line 17 towards Jitouqiao (Baifoqiao) →

On September 22, 2023, the section between Jinxing and Jiujiang North was allocated to Line 19, Jiujiang North became an interchange station and the western terminus of Line 17. Also, the station code of Line 17 was changed from 1707 to 1721.
