= Jinxing station (Chengdu Metro) =

Metro station in Chengdu, China

Jinxing 金星
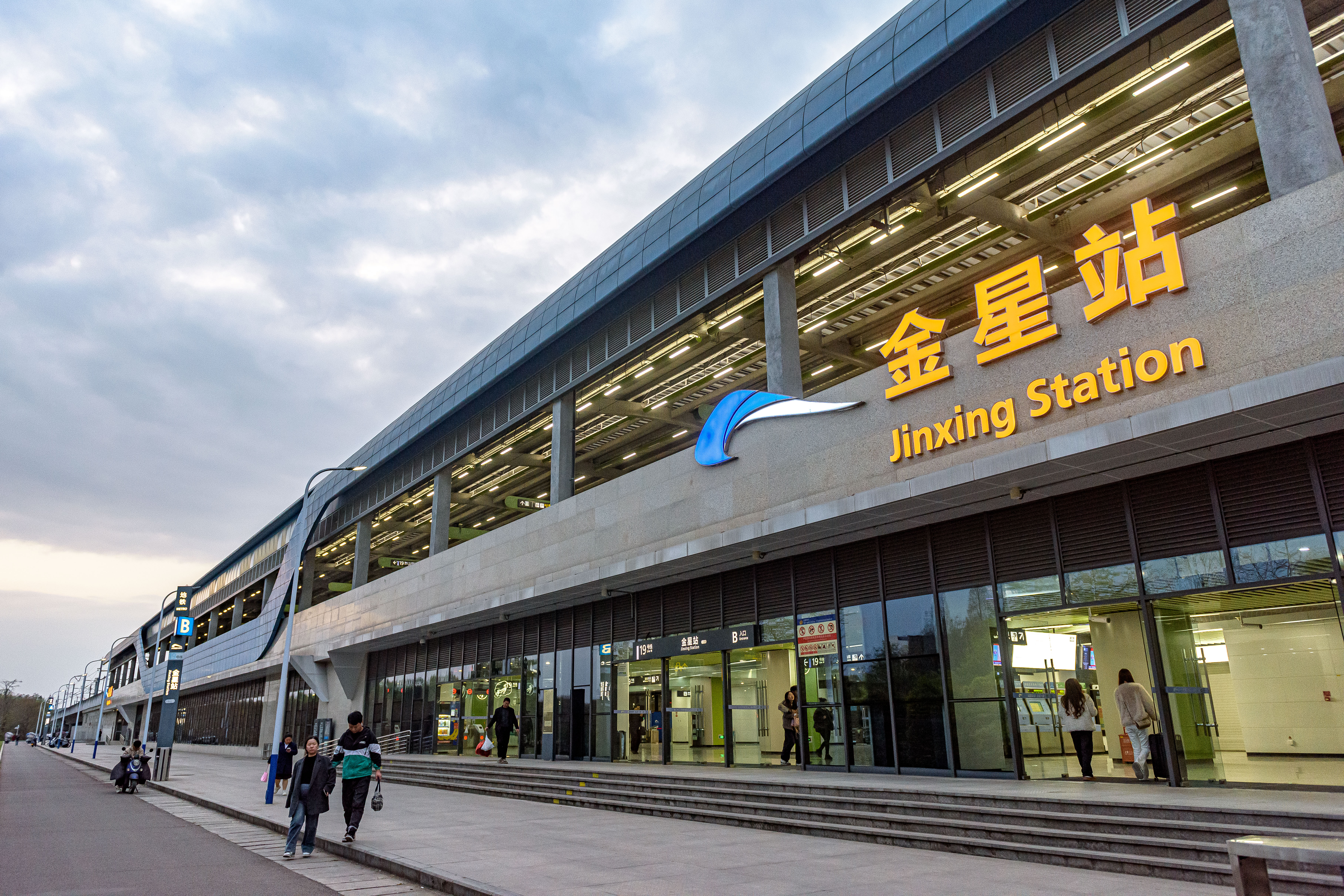
- Station hall

General information
- Location: Shengtai Avenue Tashui Section; Wenjiang District, Chengdu, Sichuan; China
- Coordinates: 30°45′31.14″N 103°47′30.77″E
- System: Chengdu metro station
- Operator: Chengdu Metro Limited
- Line: Line 19
- Platforms: 2 (1 island platform)

Other information
- Station code: 1901

History
- Opened: 18 December 2020

Services
Preceding station	Chengdu Metro	Following station
Terminus	Line 19	Huangshi towards Tianfu Station
Location

Jinxing station is a metro station of Line 19 of the Chengdu Metro. It is located at Wenjiang District, Chengdu, Sichuan, China. The station was opened on 18 December 2020, which was served as the western terminus of Line 17. On 22 September 2023, the section between this station to Jiujiang North station of Line 17 was allocated to Line 19, so it became a station of Line 19.

== Station layout ==
2F		← Line 19 termination platform
2F	Island Platform, doors will open on the left
2F		Line 19 towards Tianfu International Airport North (Huangshi) →
G	Ground level Concourse	Exits, Self-Service Tickets, Customer Service Center, Restrooms
