= Chengdu Metro =

Rapid transit system of Chengdu, Sichuan, China

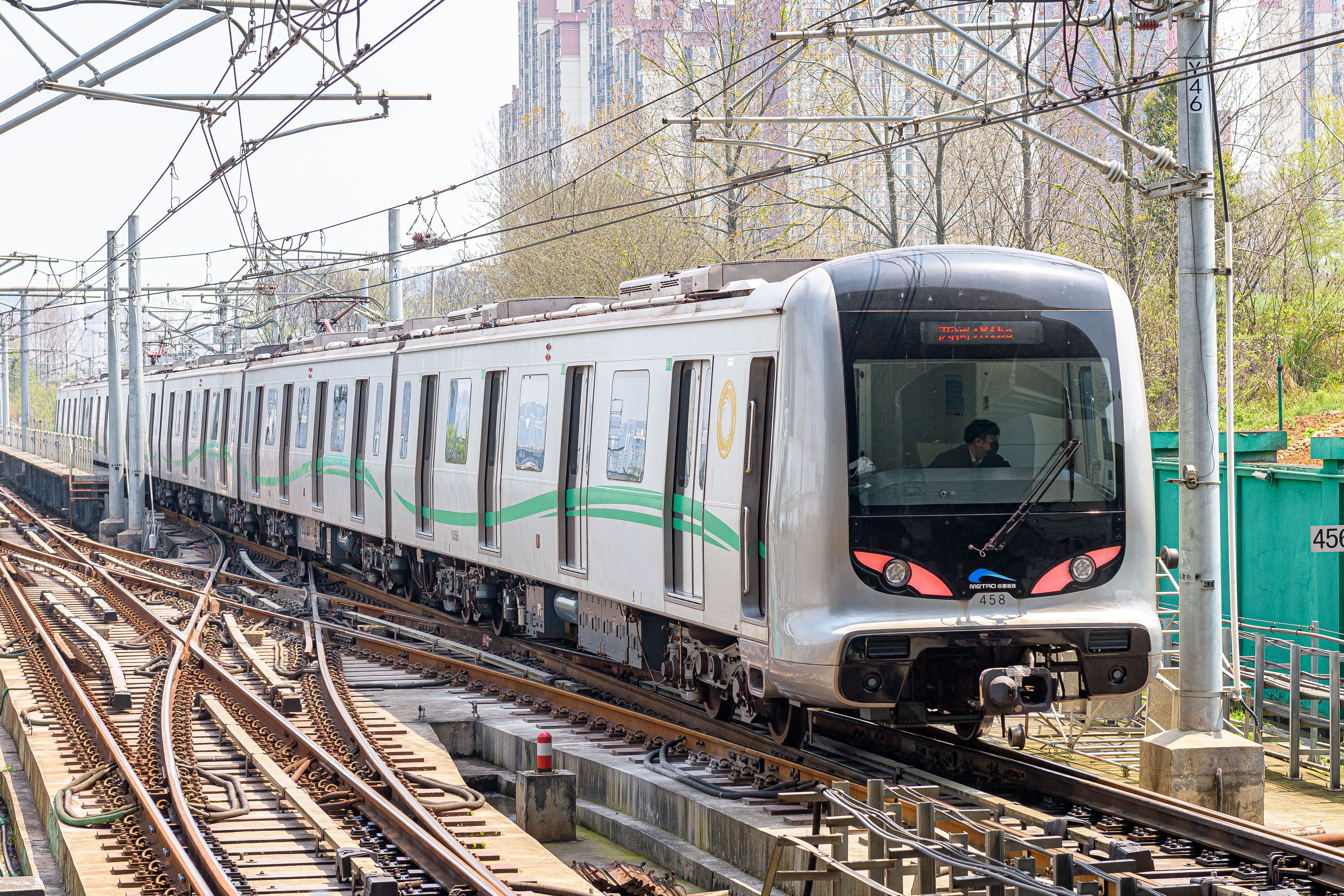
- A line 4 train at Xihe station

Overview
- Owner: City of Chengdu
- Locale: Chengdu, Sichuan, China
- Transit type: Rapid transit
- Number of lines: 17 (1 tram line excluded)
- Number of stations: 449 (36 tram stations excluded)
- Daily ridership: 5.967 million (Jan.-Jun. 2024); 9.9713 million (Highest record on 31 December 2025, 1 tram line excluded)
- Annual ridership: 2.11 billion (2023)
- Website: chengdurail.com

Operation
- Began operation: 27 September 2010; 16 years ago (10 September 2010; 16 years ago Public Trial)
- Operator: Chengdu Rail Transit Group

Technical
- System length: 721.3 km (448.2 mi) (excluding Chengdu Tram); 760.6 km (472.6 mi) (including Chengdu Tram)
- Track gauge: 1,435 mm (4 ft 8 1/2 in) standard gauge
- Electrification: Overhead line, 1,500 V DC (Note: Lines 1–10, 27, 30) and 25 kV 50 Hz AC (Note: Lines 13, 17, 18, 19)
System map
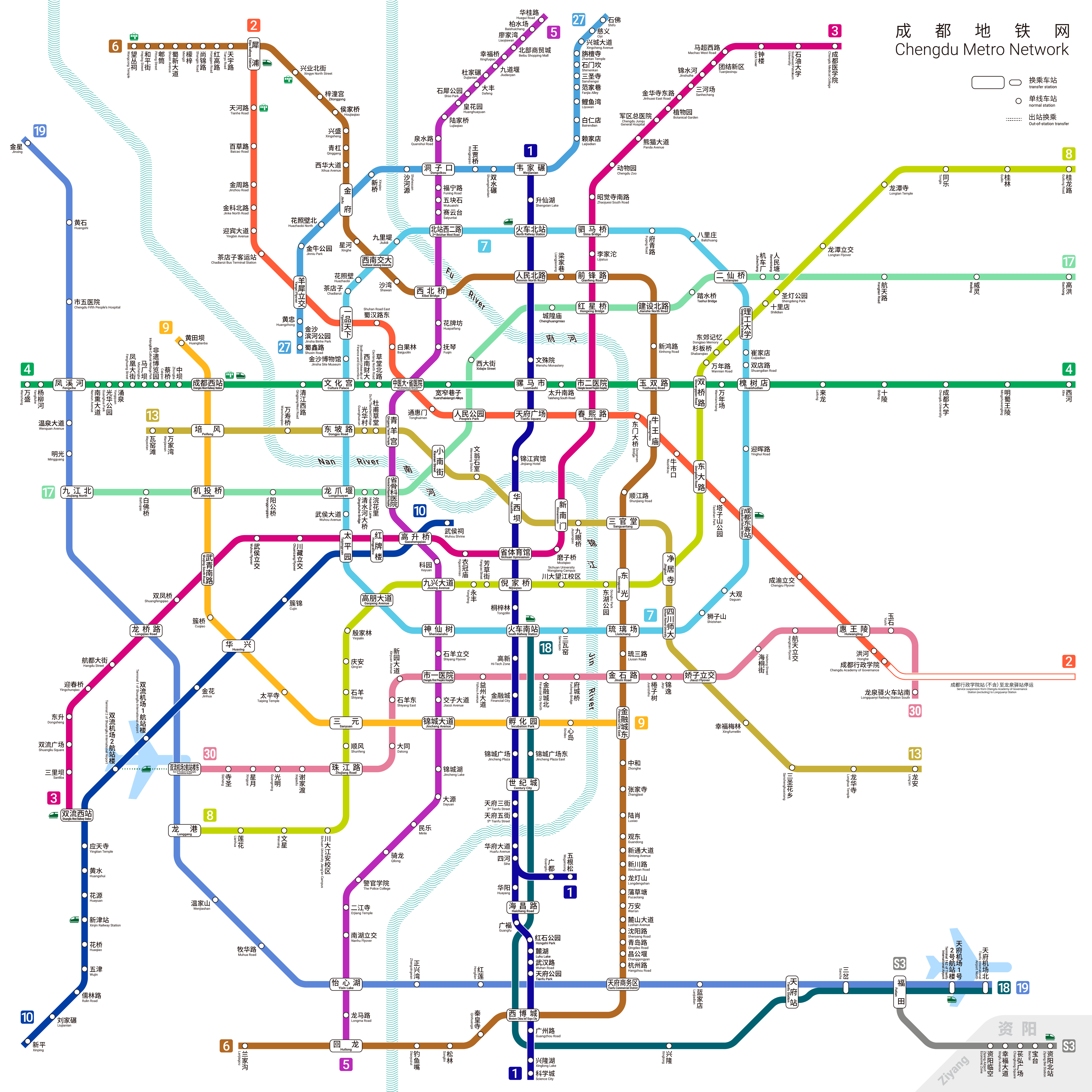

The Chengdu Metro is the rapid transit system of Chengdu, the capital of Sichuan, China. The system opened with Line 1 on 27 September 2010, and the system now has seventeen subway lines and one light rail line. It has subsequently undergone rapid expansion. Since the opening of Lines 6, 8, 9, and 17 on 18 December 2020, the Chengdu Metro is the 4th longest metro system in the world.

There are currently (September 2025) 17 operating subway lines totaling 721.3 km (448.2 mi) of track, and 1 tram line (Line T2) covering 39.3 km (24.4 mi). The Chengdu Metro serves about 6 million trips per day. As of 2021, about 2.2 million and 4.6 million people live within 500 and 800 metres (1,640 and 2,625 ft) of a subway station in Chengdu, respectively.

== Timeline ==
Line	Terminals	Commencement	Length km	Station(s)	Name
1	Shengxian Lake — Century City	27 September 2010	18.5 km (11.50 mi)	16	Phase 1
2	Chadianzi Bus Terminal — Chengdu Institute of Public Administration	16 September 2012	22.4 km (13.92 mi)	20	Phase 1
1	Jincheng Plaza opens	8 June 2013	—	1	Infill station
2	Xipu — Chadianzi Bus Terminal	8 June 2013	8.8 km (5.47 mi)	6	Phase 2 (eastern section)
2	Chengdu Institute of Public Administration — Longquanyi	26 October 2014	11.1 km (6.90 mi)	6	Phase 2 (western section)
1	Century City — Guangdu	25 July 2015	5.4 km (3.36 mi)	5	Phase 2
4	Intangible Cultural Heritage Park — Wannianchang	26 December 2015	22.4 km (13.92 mi)	16	Phase 1
3	Chengdu Junqu General Hospital — Taipingyuan	31 July 2016	20.33 km (12.63 mi)	17	Phase 1
4	Wansheng — Intangible Cultural Heritage Park	2 June 2017	10.8 km (6.71 mi)	8	Phase 2
4	Wannianchang — Xihe	2 June 2017	10.3 km (6.40 mi)	6	Phase 2
10	Taipingyuan — Shuangliu International Airport Terminal 2	6 September 2017	10.937 km (6.80 mi)	6	Phase 1
7	Cuijiadian — Cuijiadian	6 December 2017	38.63 km (24.00 mi)	31	Initial phase
1	Shengxian Lake — Weijianian	18 March 2018	1.5 km (0.93 mi)	1	Phase 3
1	Sihe — Science City	18 March 2018	14 km (8.70 mi)	11	Phase 3
1	Guangdu — Wugensong	18 March 2018	1.4 km (0.87 mi)	1	Phase 3
10	Shuangliu International Airport Terminal 2 — Xinping	27 September 2019	27.035 km (16.80 mi)	10	Phase 2
5	Huagui Road — Huilong	27 December 2019	49.01 km (30.45 mi)	41	Phase 1 & 2
18	South Railway Station — Sancha	27 September 2020	48.189 km (29.94 mi)	8	Phase 1
6	Wangcong Temple — Lanjiagou	18 December 2020	68.217 km (42.39 mi)	56	Initial phase
8	Shilidian — Lianhua	18 December 2020	29.1 km (18.08 mi)	25	Phase 1
9	Financial City East — Huangtianba	18 December 2020	22.18 km (13.78 mi)	13	Phase 1
17	Jinxing — Jitouqiao	18 December 2020	25.471 km (15.83 mi)	9	Phase 1
18	Sancha — Tianfu International Airport North	18 December 2020	19.757 km (12.28 mi)	1	Phase 2
18	Tianfu International Airport Terminal 1 & 2 opens	27 June 2021	—	1	Infill station
18	Futian opens	13 August 2023	—	1	Infill station
17	Jinxing — Jiujiang North	22 September 2023	−19.824 km (−12.32 mi)	-6	Line 17 & 19 split project
19	Jinxing — Jiujiang North	22 September 2023	19.824 km (12.32 mi)	7	Phase 1
18	Tianfu Station opens	28 November 2023	—	1	Infill station
19	Jiujiang North — Tianfu Station	28 November 2023	40.315 km (25.05 mi)	11	Phase 2
6	Qingdao Road opens	8 April 2024	—	1	Infill station
S3	Futian — Ziyang Bei	29 September 2024	38.7 km (24.05 mi)	7	Initial phase
8	Guilong Road — Shilidian	19 December 2024	8.787 km (5.46 mi)	6	Phase 2
8	Lianhua — Longgang	19 December 2024	8.787 km (5.46 mi)	1	Phase 2
27	Shifo — Shuxin Road	19 December 2024	24.86 km (15.45 mi)	23	Phase 1
6	Lujiao opens	22 August 2025	—	1	Infill station
10	Wuhou Shrine — Taipingyuan	17 September 2025	5.87 km (3.65 mi)	3	Phase 3 (initial section)
17	Jitouqiao — Gaohong	17 September 2025	25.823 km (16.05 mi)	18	Phase 2
13	Wayaotan — Longan	16 December 2025	29.08 km (18.07 mi)	21	Phase 1
30	East of Terminal 2 of Shuangliu International Airport — Longquanqi Railway Station South	16 December 2025	27.96 km (17.37 mi)	22	Phase 1
2	Longquanyi Railway Station	30 October 2026	—	1	Infill station

== Operating network ==
There are 17 subway lines covering 721.3 km (448.2 mi) with 449 stations, and a light rail line with 36 stops (Line T2) covering 39.3 km (24.4 mi).

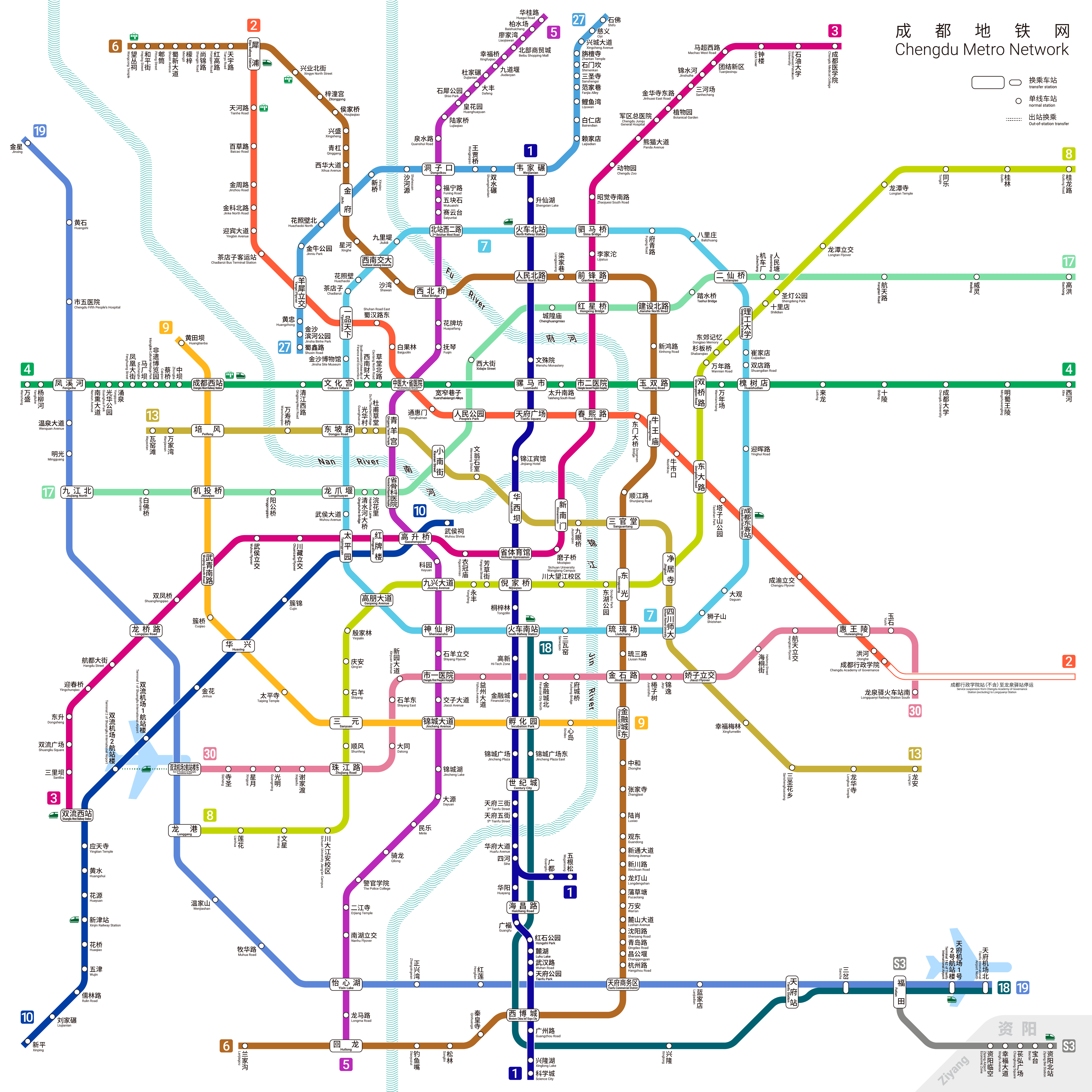
Chengdu Metro Network

Line	Terminals (District/County)		Commencement	Newest Extension	Length km	Stations
Line 1 (Chengdu Metro)	Weijianian (Jinniu)	Science City (Shuangliu)	27 September 2010	18 March 2018	41.00	35
Line 1 (Chengdu Metro)	Weijianian (Jinniu)	Wugensong (Shuangliu)	27 September 2010	18 March 2018	41.00	35
Line 2 (Chengdu Metro)	Xipu (Pidu)	Longquanyi (Longquanyi)	16 September 2012	26 October 2014	42.27	33
Line 3 (Chengdu Metro)	Chengdu Medical College (Xindu)	Shuangliu West Station (Shuangliu)	31 July 2016	26 December 2018	49.89	37
Line 4 (Chengdu Metro)	Wansheng (Wenjiang)	Xihe (Longquanyi)	26 December 2015	2 June 2017	43.48	30
Line 5 (Chengdu Metro)	Huagui Road (Xindu)	Huilong (Shuangliu)	27 December 2019	—	49.01	41
Line 6 (Chengdu Metro)	Wangcong Temple (Pidu)	Lanjiagou (Shuangliu)	18 December 2020	—	68.88	56
(loop line)	Cuijiadian (Chenghua)	Cuijiadian (Chenghua)	6 December 2017	—	38.63	31
Line 8 (Chengdu Metro)	Guilong Road (Chenghua)	Longgang (Shuangliu)	18 December 2020	19 December 2024	36.71	32
Line 9 (Chengdu Metro)	Financial City East (Jinjiang)	Huangtianba (Qingyang)	18 December 2020	—	22.18	13
Line 10 (Chengdu Metro)	Wuhou Shrine (Wuhou)	Xinping (Xinjin)	6 September 2017	17 September 2025	43.88	19
Line 13 (Chengdu Metro)	Wayaotan (Qingyang)	Long'an (Longquanyi)	16 December 2025		29.07	21
Line 17 (Chengdu Metro)	Jiujiang North (Shuangliu)	Gaohong (Chenghua)	18 December 2020	17 September 2025	31.47	21
Line 18 (Chengdu Metro)	South Railway Station (Wuhou)	Tianfu Airport North (Jianyang)	27 September 2020	18 December 2020	69.99	12
Line 19 (Chengdu Metro)	Jinxing (Wenjiang)	Tianfu Station / Tianfu Airport North (Tianfu New Area) / (Jianyang)	18 December 2020	28 November 2023	63.31	18
Line 27 (Chengdu Metro)	Shifo (Xindu)	Shuxin Road (Qingyang)	19 December 2024	—	24.86	22
Line 30 (Chengdu Metro)	East of Terminal 2 of Shuangliu International Airport (Shuangliu)	Longquanyi Railway Station South (Longquanyi)	16 December 2025	—	27.96	22
Line S3 (Chengdu Metro)	Futian (Jianyang)	Ziyang Bei Station (Yanjiang, Ziyang)	29 September 2024	—	38.7	6
Total					721.3	449

=== Line 1 ===
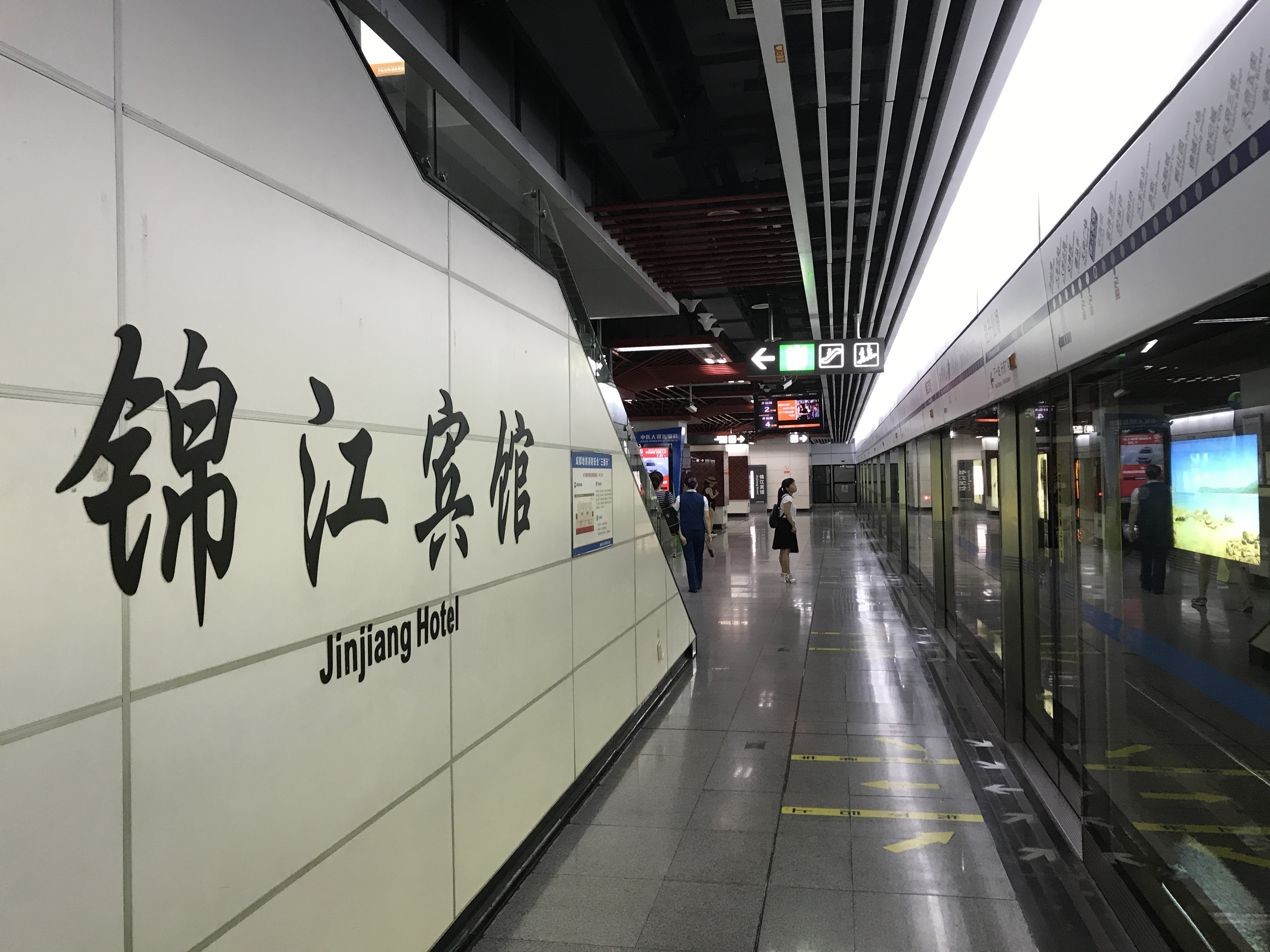
Jinjiang Hotel station of Line 1

The first phase of Line 1 cost 7 billion yuan to construct. A natural ventilation system has been used in the underground section of Line 1 on the subway system from Southern Third Ring Road to Jincheng Plaza Station. Square ventilation units are built every 30 m (98 ft 5 in) along the subway top to allow fresh air from the ground enter the construction site underground. The method is used in subway construction in other countries as it cuts the construction cost and it saves energy. The subway system is the first in China to adopt such a ventilation system during construction. Chengdu Metro is planning to set up a section for subway fire control and introduce the latest fire fighting technologies and vehicles. Line 1's color is dark blue.

=== Line 2 ===
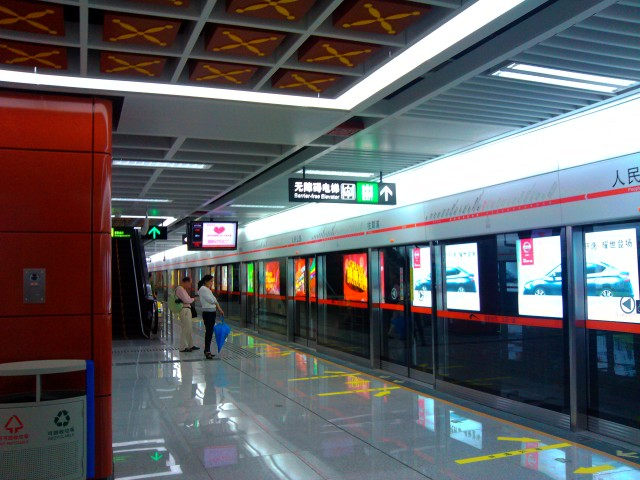
People's Park station of Line 2

Line 2 is a crosstown northwest–southeast trunk route. This line serves the Chengdu East railway station. Line 2 began operation on 16 September 2012. An 11 km (6.8 mi) long mostly elevated extension to Longquanyi began testing in April 2014 opened in October 2014. Line 2's color is orange.

=== Line 3 ===
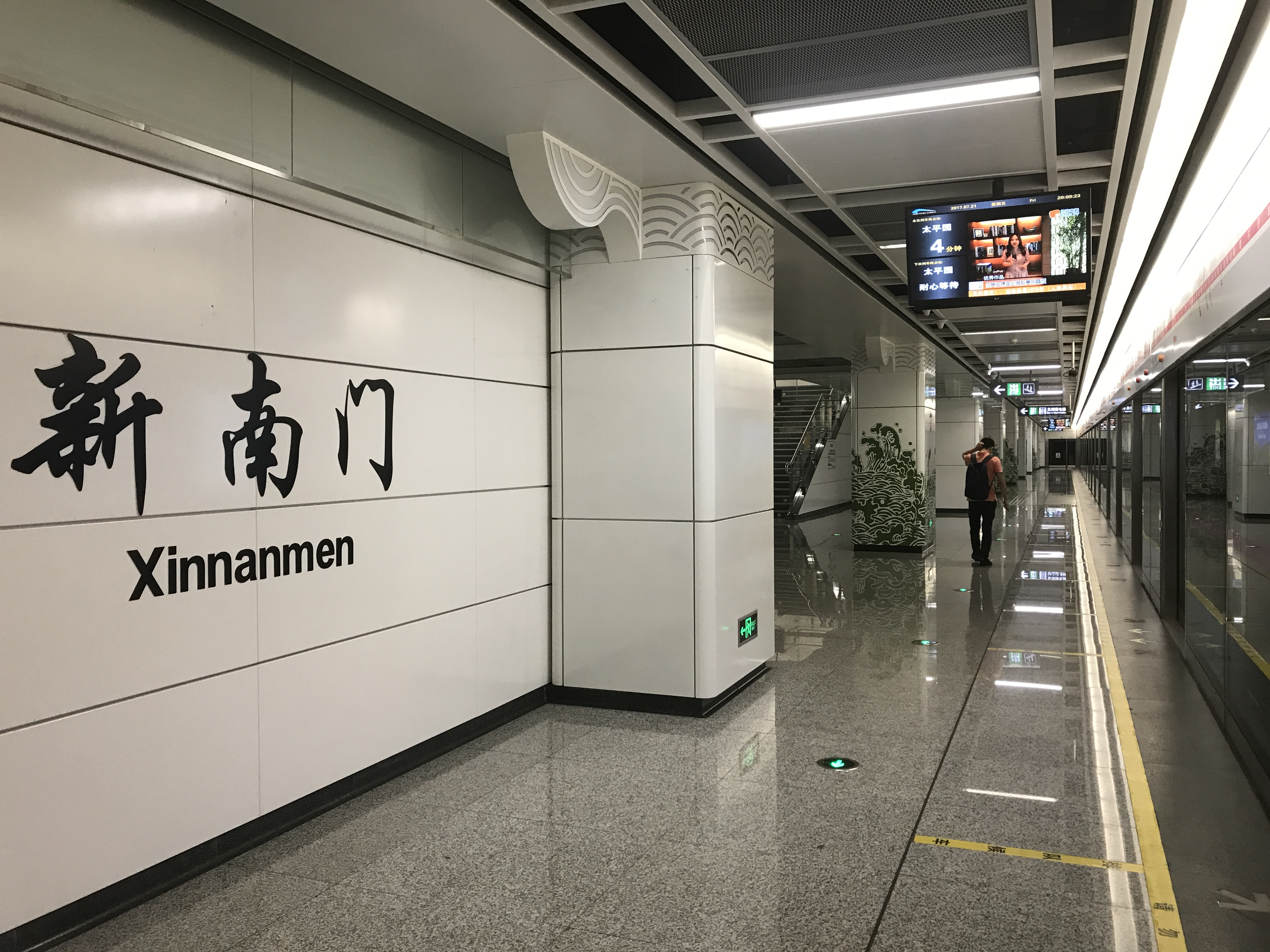
Xinnanmen station of Line 3

Line 3 runs in a northeast–southwest direction from Chengdu Medical College to Shuangliu West Station. Phase 1 of this line began construction on 28 April 2012, and opened on 31 July 2016. It was Chengdu's final line to use the lower capacity type B trains, subsequent lines favoring the longer and wider Type A cars. Line 3's color is magenta.

=== Line 4 ===
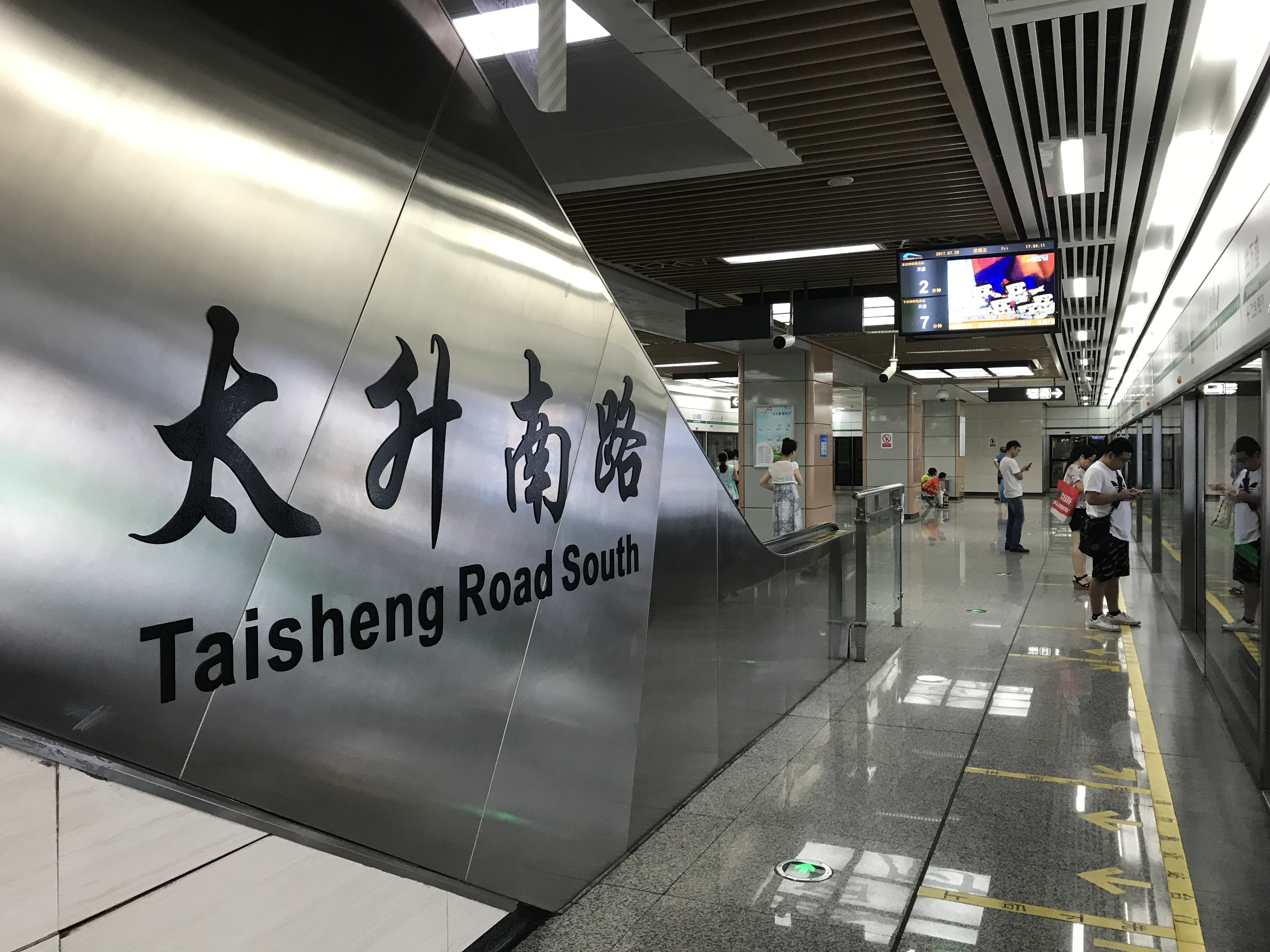
Taisheng Road South station of Line 4

Line 4 is the third line to enter revenue service on the metro network in Chengdu, Sichuan. Line 4 runs in an east–west direction, stretching from Wansheng in Wenjiang to Xihe in the Longquanyi. The first phase started construction on 22 July 2011, and began operation on 26 December 2015. Testing began on the east of west extensions of Line 4 as part of Phase II expansion on 10 December 2016. Line 4's color is green. It was the first line to use the longer and wider Type A trains, which are higher capacity.

=== Line 5 ===
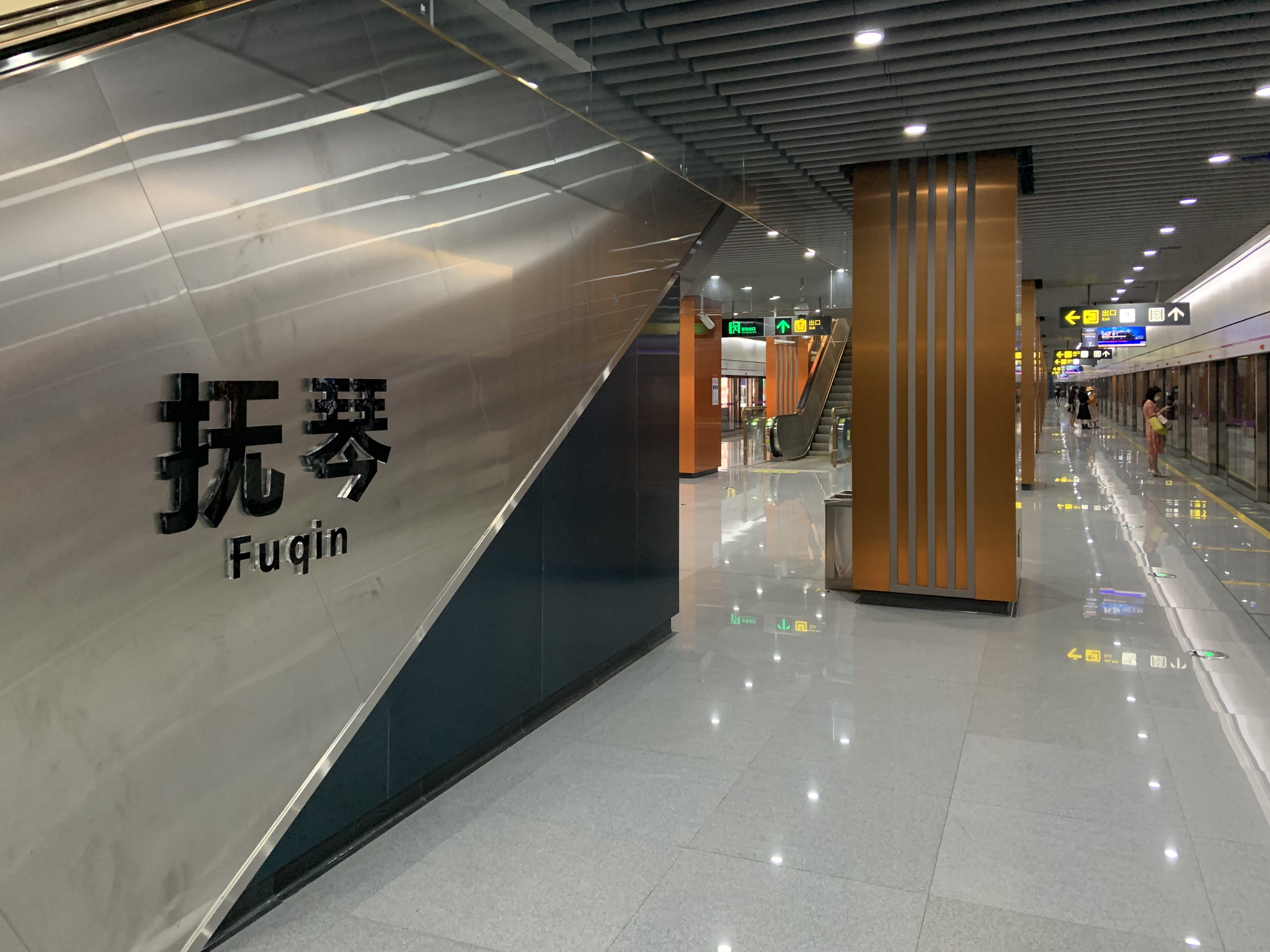
Fuqin station of Line 5

Line 5 is a crosstown north–south trunk line. Despite being numbered such, it was the seventh line to open, having started operation on 27 December 2019. Line 5's color is purple.

=== Line 6 ===
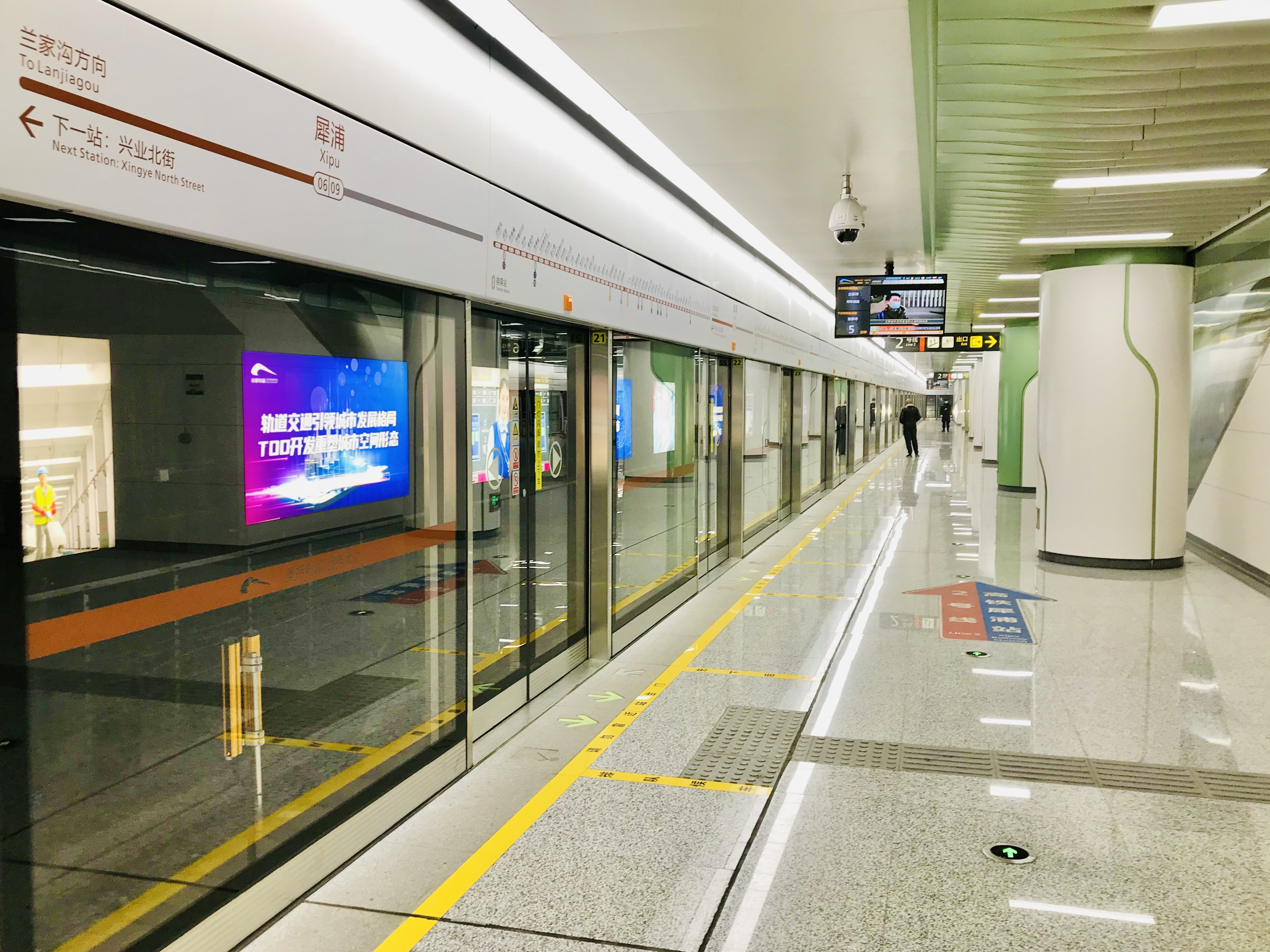
Xipu station of Line 6

Line 6 is a crosstown northwest–south-west pivotal line. It is the second longest metro line in Chengdu. It has more stations than any other metro line in China, with 54 currently plus two more infill stations coming later. It is one of the four lines to have started operation on 18 December 2020. Line 6's color is brown.

=== Line 7 ===
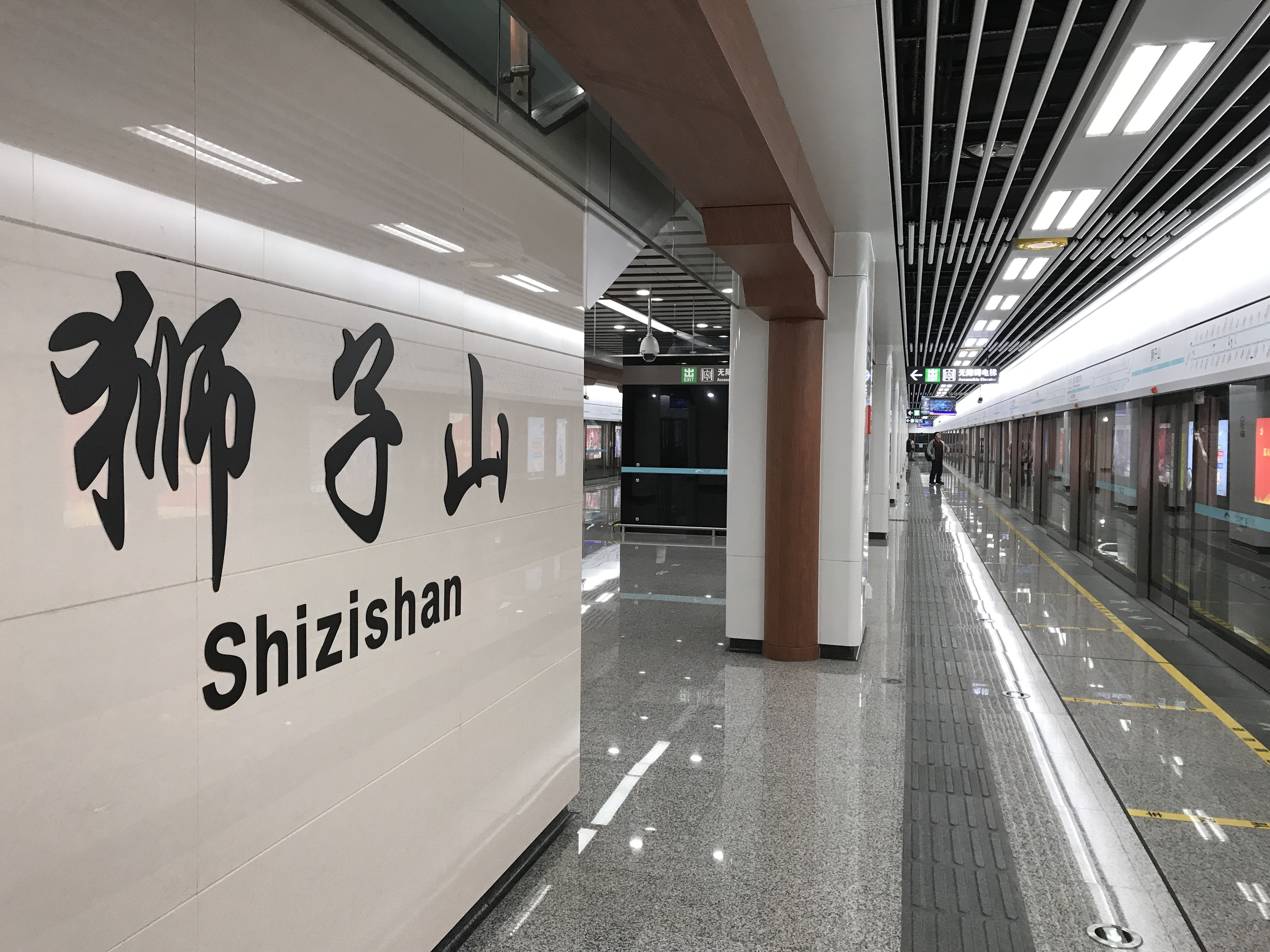
Shizishan station of Line 7

Line 7 is a loop line which runs around downtown Chengdu. Despite the number, it was actually the sixth line to open, having started operation on 6 December 2017. Line 7's color is sky blue.

=== Line 8 ===
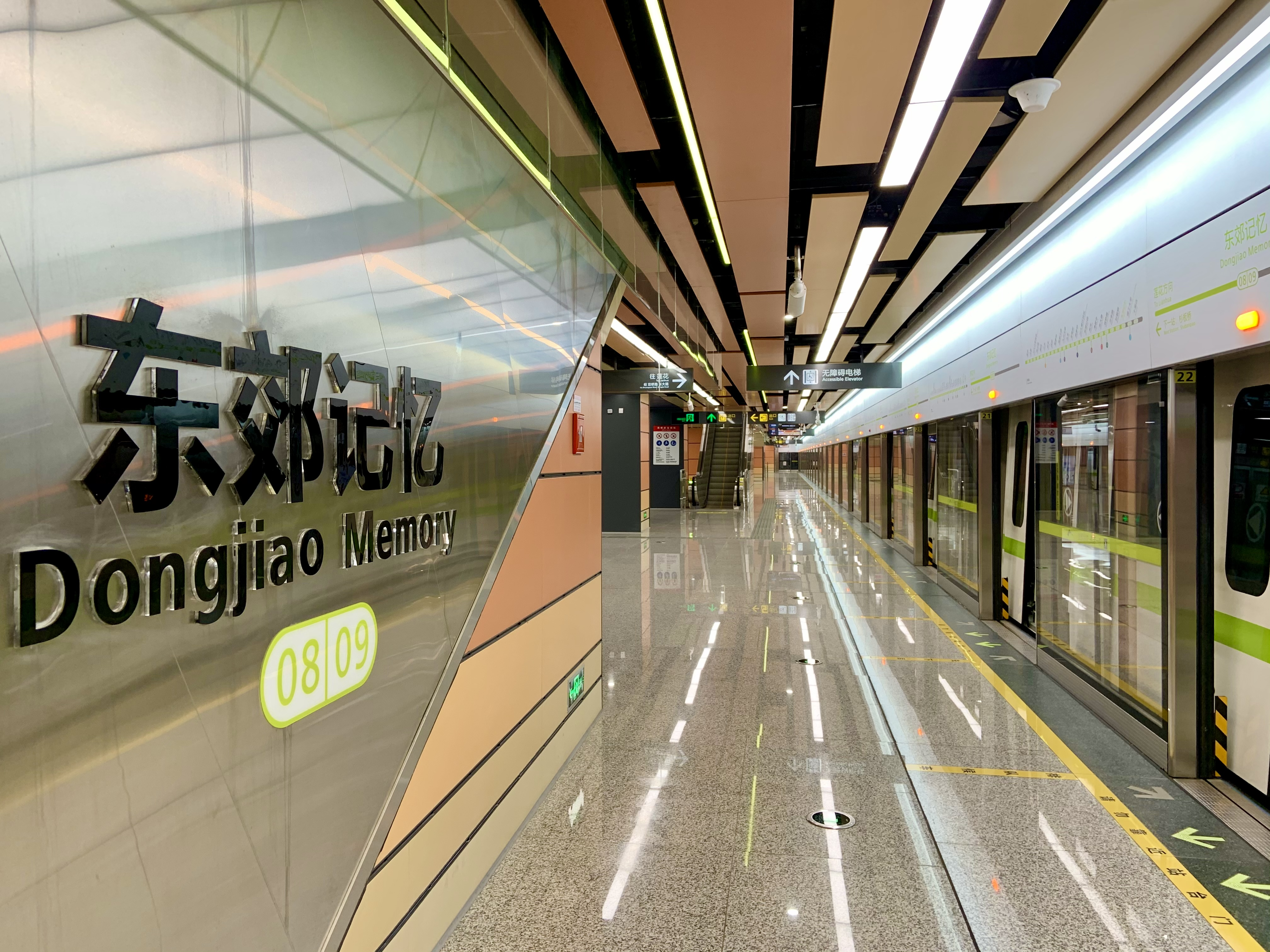
Dongjiao Memory station of Line 8

Line 8 is a crosstown northeast–southwest metro line. It connects the Wangjiang and Jiang'an campuses of Sichuan University. Phase 1 began operation on 18 December 2020, the same day as lines 6, 9, and 18. Phase 2 opened on 19 December 2024. Line 8's color is chartreuse.

=== Line 9 ===
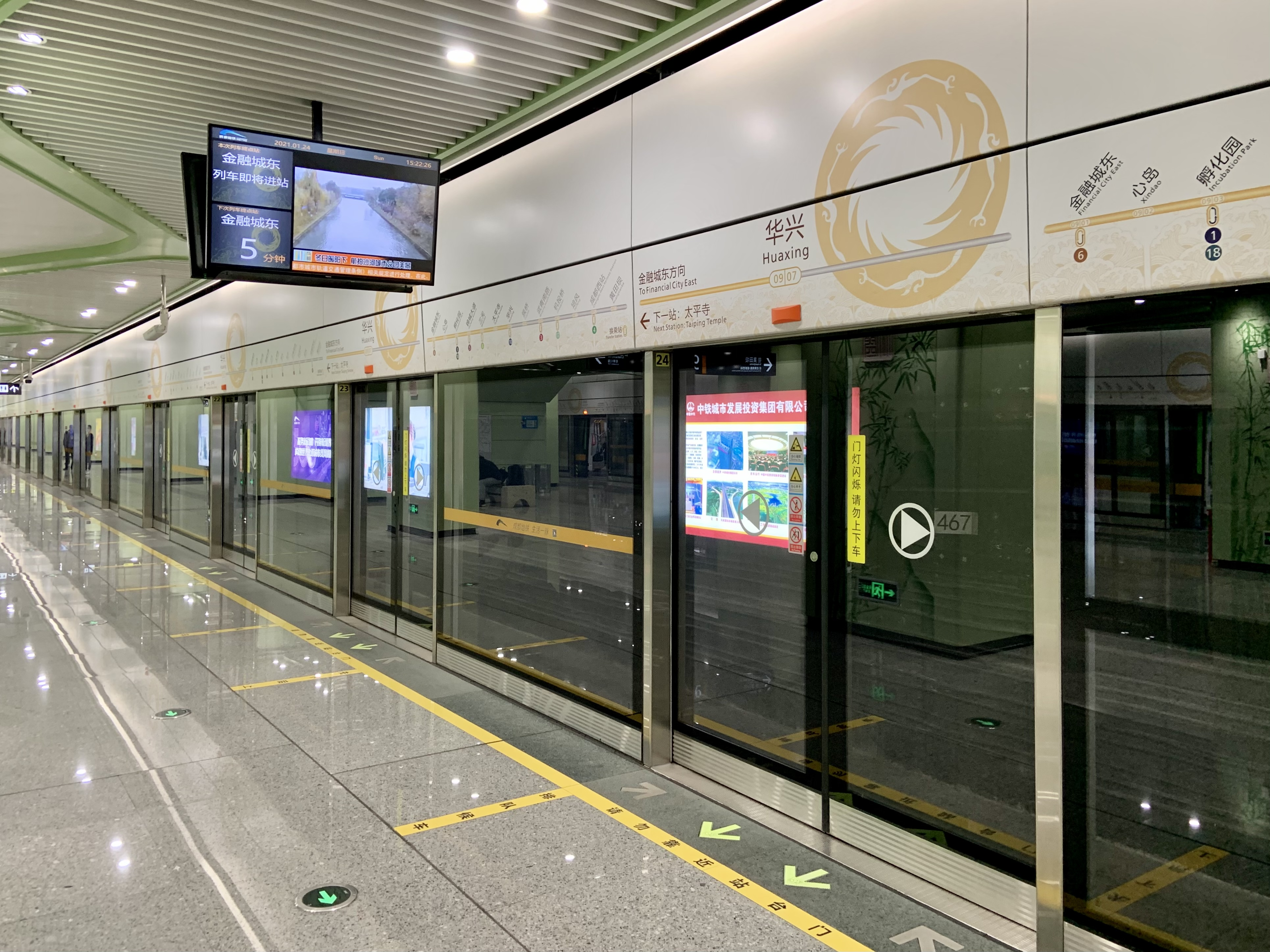
Huaxing station of Line 9

Line 9 is planned to be the system's second circle line when it is fully completed according to plan. It is the first driverless metro line in Mid/West China. Phase 1 started operation on 18 December 2020. Line 9's color is bright orange.

=== Line 10 ===
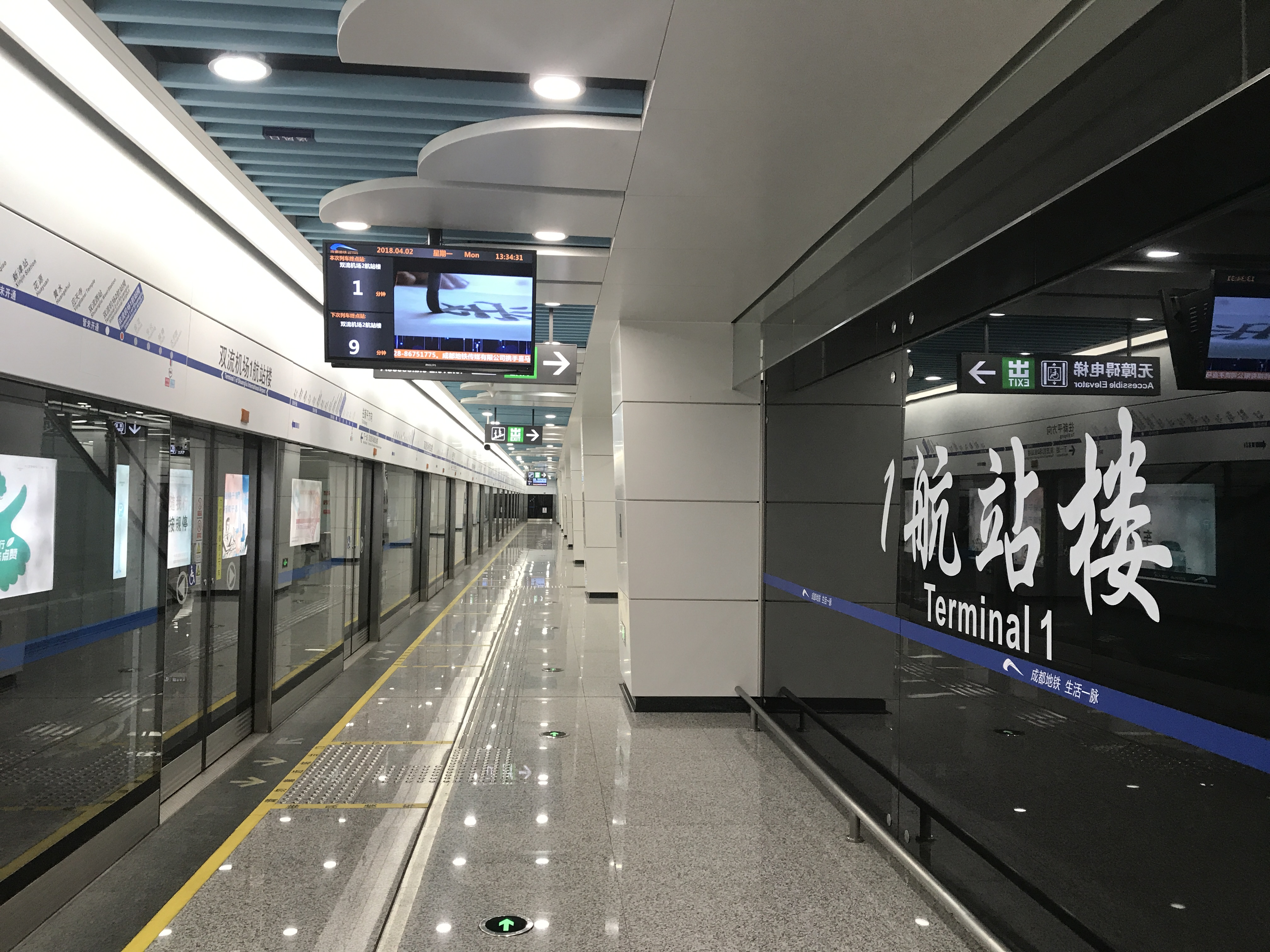
Terminal 1 of Shuangliu International Airport station of Line 10

Line 10 serves Chengdu Shuangliu International Airport. It started operation on 6 September 2017. It was also the first line in the system to use the higher-capacity type A trains. Line 10's color is blue.

=== Line 13 ===
Line 13 is a metro line in Central Chengdu. It started operation on 16 December 2025.

=== Line 17 ===
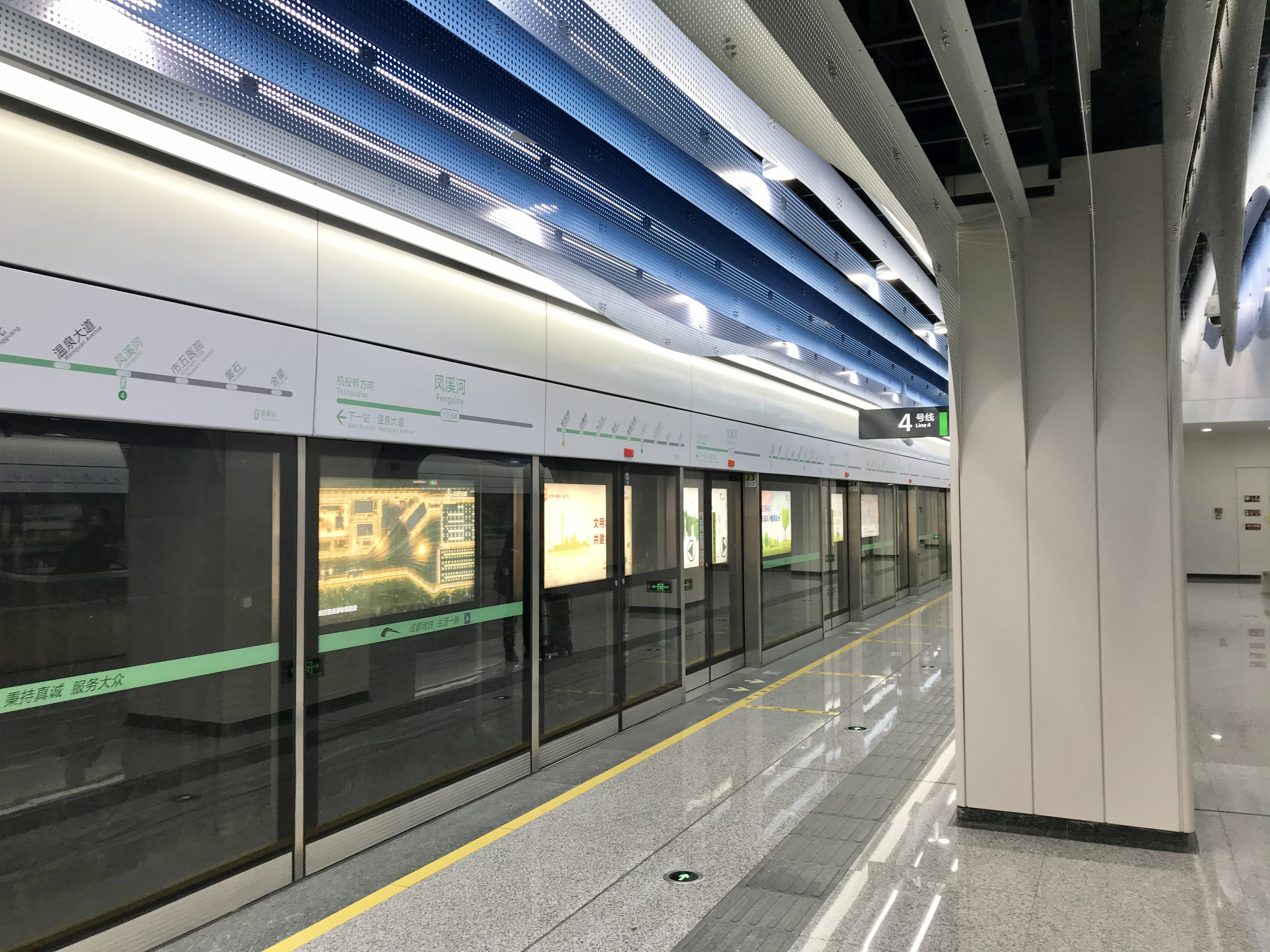
Fengxihe station of Line 17 previously (now Line 19)

Line 17 is a metro line in Central Chengdu. Phase 1, including phase 1 of line 19, started operation on 18 December 2020. On 22 September 2023, the Jinxing-Jiujiang North section was integrated into Line 19. Like line 18 is uses a special variant of Type A trains with one less door per side and using 25 kV AC overhead power, as opposed to the "standard" 1500 V DC most newer metros in China use. Line 17's color is pale green.

=== Line 18 ===
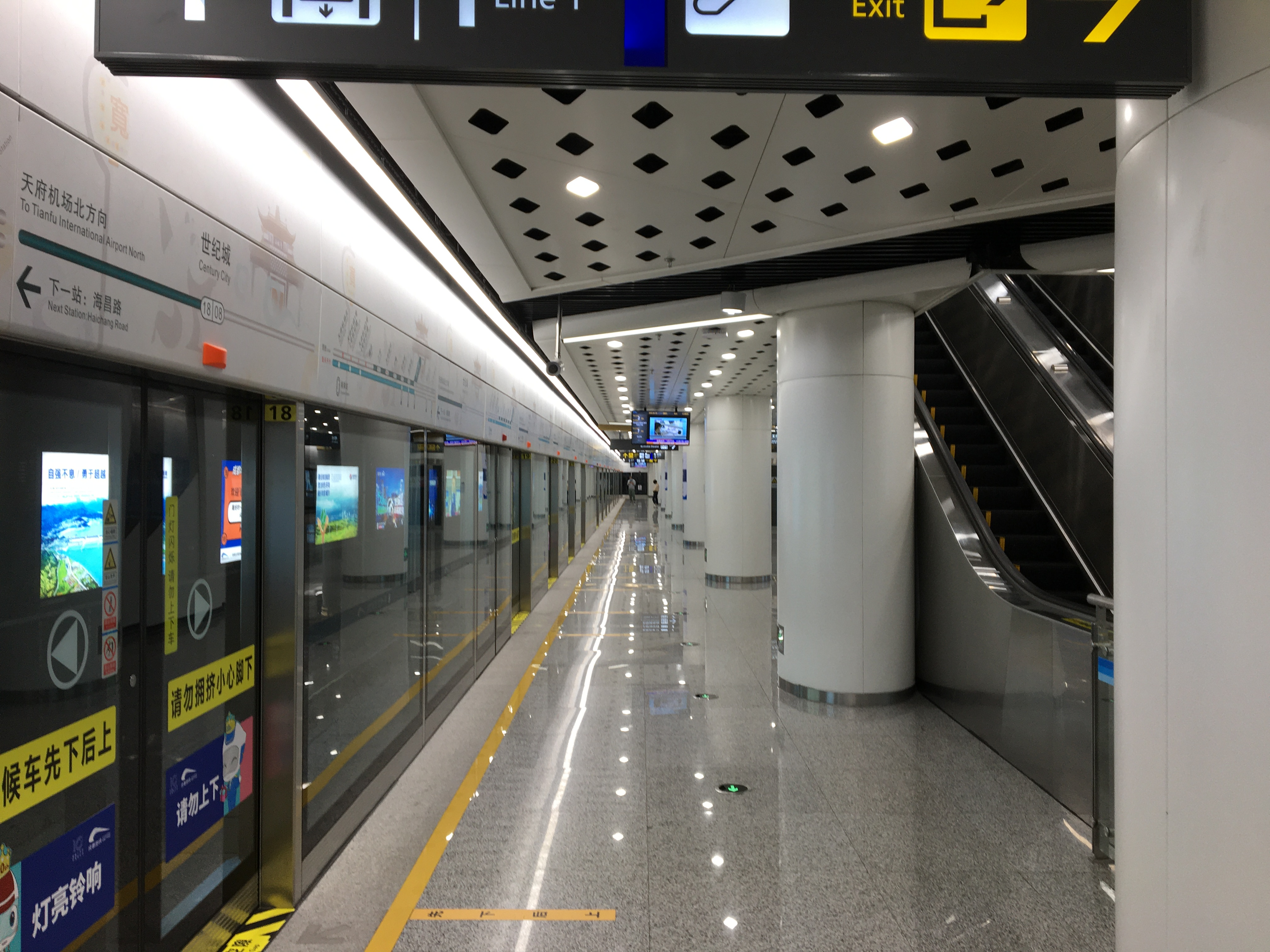
Century City station of Line 18

Line 18 is the first express metro line in the city. It parallels the southern section of Line 1 serving Tianfu New Area. It started operation on 27 September 2020. Phase 2 started operation on 18 December 2020. It is the third longest metro line in China after Chongqing Line 6 being the longest and Shanghai Line 11 in second place. It is still however the longest line that does not have any branches. Like line 17, it uses a special variant of Type A trains with one less door per side and using 25 kV AC overhead power. Line 18's color is teal.

=== Line 19 ===
Line 19 is an express metro line linking Shuangliu International Airport and Tianfu International Airport. It partly shares the track with Line 18 between Tianfu Station and Tianfu Airport North. It started operation on 22 September 2023. Line 19's color is light purple.

=== Line 27 ===
Line 27 is connects several northern regions of the city. It's the city's second metro line that use driverless trains. Line 27's color is light blue.

=== Line 30 ===
Line 30 links Shuangliu International Airport and Longquanyi Railway Station. The metro station (Longquanyi Railway Station South) is located at the south side of the Longquanyi Railway Station (formerly known as Shilingnan Railway Station). It started operation on 16 December 2025. Despite its number, it was only the sixteenth line to open.

=== Line S3 ===
Line S3 is an express metro line linking Futian in Jianyang, Chengdu to Ziyang North Railway Station in Ziyang. It is the first intercity rapid transit line of Chengdu Metro system. It started operation on 29 September 2024. Line S3's color is grey.

=== Tram Line 2 ===
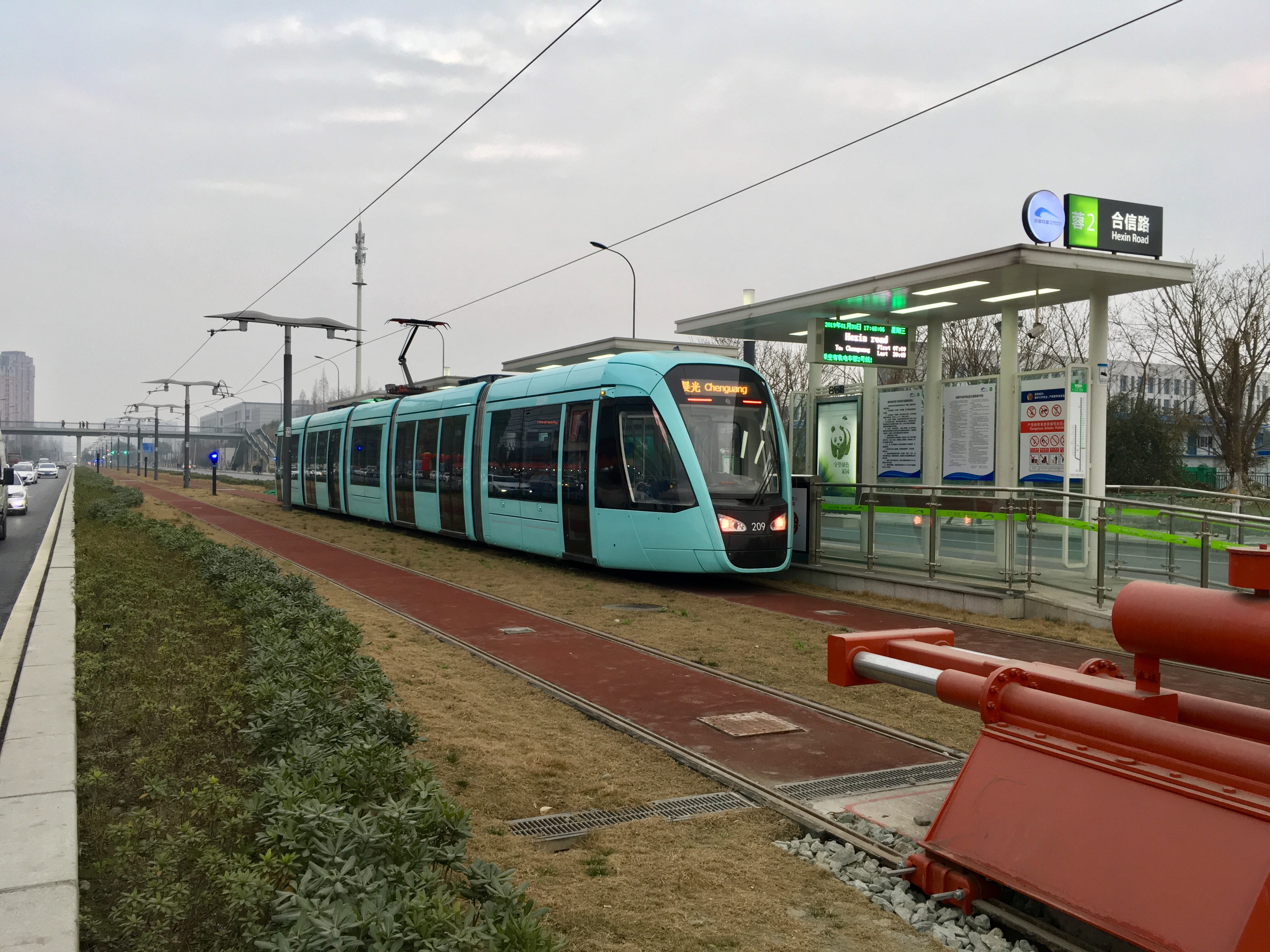
Hexin Road station of Tram Line 2

Chengdu Tram Line 2 serves the north-west part of the city without a metro line. The line uses low-floor trams derived from the Alstom Citadis. Tram Line 2's color is light green.

== History ==
Evolution of the Chengdu Metro

=== Inception ===
In 1985, the Chengdu Planning Bureau set up an integrated transportation planning office which began the process of the planning for a rapid transit network for Chengdu. By 1992, a proposal for the subway was sent to the National Planning Commission and was subsequently rejected. In 2004 before the approval of the National Development and Reform Commission Chengdu started reconstructing Tianfu Square with provisions for Tianfu Square station. The first phase of Chengdu Metro, consisting of Lines 1 and 2, were approved by the NDRC on 11 September 2005.

=== First phase projects ===
==== 2005 ====
- Line 1 construction commenced on 28 December 2005.

==== 2007 ====
- Construction of Line 2 began on 29 December 2007.

==== 2009 ====
- In May 2009, the National Development and Reform Commission (NDRC) approved western and eastern extensions of Line 2, along with the first phase of Lines 3 and 4.

==== 2010 ====
- Line 1 opened on 27 September 2010.

==== 2011 ====
- Construction of the first phase of Line 4 started on 22 July 2011.

==== 2012 ====
- On 25 April 2012, Line 3 received approval from the NDRC.
- On 16 January 2012, the NDRC officially approved the southern extension of Line 1.
- Line 3 construction began on 28 April 2012.

==== 2013 ====
- On 8 June 2013, Line 2 West Extension to Xipu and Ocean Park Station on Line 1 opened; Ocean Park was later renamed Jincheng Plaza.

==== 2014 ====
- On 26 October 2014, Line 2 East Extension to Longquanyi opened.

==== 2015 ====
- On 25 July 2015, Line 1 South Extension opened.
- On 10 December 2015, Line 4 Phase 1 opened.

==== 2016 ====
- On 31 July 2016, Line 3 Phase 1 was opened, marking the completion of the first phase.

=== Second phase projects ===
==== 2009 ====
- In May 2009, the National Development and Reform Commission (NDRC) approved the second phase of expansion for the Chengdu Metro, encompassing Line 1 Phase 3, Line 3 Phase 2 and 3, Line 4 Phase 2, Line 5 Phase 1 and 2, Line 6 Phase 1, Line 7, Line 10 Phase 1, and Line 18. The total length of Phase 2 amounted to 183.3 km (113.9 mi) of new subway infrastructure.

==== 2014 ====
- On 4 June 2014, construction commenced for Line 10 Phase 1.

==== 2015 ====
- In August 2015, construction began for Line 5 Phase 1.

==== 2017 ====
- On 28 February 2017, the first tunnel boring machine for Line 18 was launched.
- On 2 June 2017, Line 4 Phase 2 was opened.
- On 6 September 2017, Line 10 Phase 1 was opened.
- On 6 December 2017, Line 7 was opened.

==== 2018 ====
- On 18 March 2018, Line 1 Phase 3 was opened.
- On 26 December 2018, Line 3 Phase 2 and 3 were opened.

==== 2019 ====
- In November 2019, Chengdu Metro introduced new signage branding coinciding with the opening of Line 5.
- On 27 December 2019, Line 5 and Line 10 Phase 2 were opened.

==== 2020 ====
- On 27 May 2020, Line 6 began testing.
- On 2 June 2020, Line 18, the largest Public-Private Partnership (PPP) project in China, commenced its 3-month trial operation.
- On 6 August 2020, Line 18 completed its fire-prevention assessment.
- On 27 September 2020, Line 18 Phase 1 was opened.
- On 18 December 2020, Line 6 Phases 1 to 3, Line 8 Phase 1, Line 9 Phase 1, Line 17 Phase 1, and Line 18 Phase 2 were opened, marking the completion of Phase 2 and 3 projects. With these openings, Chengdu Metro updated the wayfinding in all stations, introducing alpha-numeric station identifiers, and installed new LCD passenger information systems.
- In 2020, with the opening of Line 6, Line 18 and other lines, Chengdu Metro refreshed the wayfinding in all stations with alpha-numeric station identifiers. In addition, new LCD passenger information systems, such as "comprehensive information screen" LCD, in station concourses and on screen doors at some stations.

==== 2022 ====
- On 16 February 2022, in response to noise issues on Line 5, operational speed limits were imposed on the Xingfuqiao to Beibu Shopping Mall to Liaojiawan sections, with an average speed of 60 km/h, to minimize noise impact on the environment and neighboring areas.

=== Third phase projects ===
==== 2016 ====
- On 11 July 2016, the National Development and Reform Commission (NDRC) approved the third phase of Chengdu Metro's expansion plan. This phase included Line 6 Phase 2 and 3, Line 8, Line 9, Line 10 Phase 2, Line 17 Phase 1, and Line 18. Simultaneously with the second phase, the construction of the third phase commenced.
- On 16 August 2016, Line 18's construction officially started.
- On 31 December 2016, construction began for Lines 8, Line 9, and Line 10 Phase 2.

==== 2017 ====
- On 27 February 2017, Line 17 Phase 1 construction was initiated.

==== 2019 ====
- On 19 February 2019, Chengdu received its first-ever subway train capable of GoA4 ATO for Line 9.
- On 30 July 2019, the tunnel boring machine completed tunneling for Line 9 between Chengdu West Railway and Huangtianba Stations.
- On 5 August 2019, all stations on Line 17 Phase 1 completed the construction of main structures and roofing.

==== 2020 ====
- On 14 January 2020, the last section of track was laid for all of Line 9 Phase 1, between Sanyuan Station to Jincheng Avenue Station.
- On 11 April 2020, Chengdu Metro reported the completion of track-laying for Line 8.
- On 19 June 2020, both Line 9 and Line 17 started their 3-month trial operations.
- On 24 June 2020, the construction of Wutongmiao Temple Depot for Line 17 was completed.
- On 8 July 2020, Line 6 Phase 1 and 2 were officially powered on.
- On 17 July 2020, the construction officially started for the 4 stations on Line 30 in Longquanyi District.
- On 8 August 2020, Line 8's whole line power network passed quality assessment.
- On 18 December 2020, Line 6 Phase 1/2/3, Line 8 Phase 1, Line 9 Phase 1, Line 17 Phase 1, and Line 18 Phase 2 were opened, marking the completion of Phase 2 and 3 projects. This milestone also positioned the Chengdu Metro as the fourth largest subway system globally with over 500 km of operating subway routes after 15 years of rapid growth.

=== Fourth phase projects ===
==== 2019 ====
- On 17 June 2019, the NDRC approved the fourth phase expansion for the Chengdu Metro. It includes Line 8 Phase 2, Line 10 Phase 3, Line 13 Phase 1, Line 17 Phase 2, Line 18 Phase 3, Line 19 Phase 2, Line 27 Phase 1, and Line 30 Phase 1. The Fourth Phase encompasses 176.65 km of new lines.

==== 2020 ====
- On 18 March 2020, construction commenced on Line 8 Phase 2, Line 19 Phase 2, Line 27 Phase 1, and Line 30 Phase 1.
- On 11 April 2020, construction began on Line 10 Phase 3, Line 13 Phase 1, Line 17 Phase 2, Line 18 Phase 3, and Line 19 Phase 2.
- On 18 May 2020, Line 8 Phase 2, Line 27 Phase 1, and Line 30 Phase 1 started construction, marking the commencement of all Fourth Phase projects.
- On 17 July 2020, construction officially began for the last 4 stations on Line 30 in Longquanyi District.
- On 27 November 2020, construction officially started for Line S3, a connection line between Chengdu and Ziyang.

==== 2021 ====
- On 2 April 2021, Chengdu Metro reached a ridership of 7 million per day for the first time.

==== 2022 ====
- On 16 December 2022, Line 13 Phase 1 completed the tunnel construction from Sanguantang to Jiuyanqiao Section, marking the success of the longest underwater/river tunnel work in Chengdu Metro history.
- On 22 December 2022, Line 30 Phase 1 completed the structure construction of Jiaozi Flyover.
- In December 2022, Line 30 Phase 1 completed the water/cable/pipe reroute for Financial City North station, marking the station's main structure construction entering the next stage.
- In December 2022, Chengdu Metro's deepest and first 4-line transfer station, Luomashi, finished digging. Line 18 Phase 1's platform is 45.5 meters deep, with Chengdu North to Luomashi's deepest tunnel at 48.8 meters, equivalent to 16 floors underground. Luomashi serves Line 1, Line 4, Line 10, and Line 18.

==== 2023 ====
- On 13 January 2023, all 15 stations of Line 13 Phase 1 finished structural construction. The line's tunnel is 62% complete, and the railroad is 10% complete.
- On 12 February 2023, Line 19 Phase 2 was officially powered on.
- On 17 February 2023, Line 30 Phase 1 from Terminal 2 of Shuangliu International Airport East to Sisheng section's left tunnel was finished, marking the completion of the 18th tunnel.
- On 21 February 2023, Line 19 Phase 2's signal and communication system started operational testing in Xinmiao Control Centre (新苗控制中心), and Phase 2 signal now synchronizes with Phase 1.
- On 22 February 2023, Line 17 Phase 2 finished Jinxing station's main power centre's land clearance.
- On 20 March 2023, Line 19's Changshun Villige Depot (长顺村停车场) was handed over to the operation.
- On 21 March 2023, Line 27 finished all station construction.
- On 26 March 2023, Line 18 increased express service from 6 to 16 trains to meet the increasing needs for Chengdu Tianfu International Airport and daily commuters. Line 18 also increased 58 trains daily, with 36 trains for Airport Express Service.
- On 27 March 2023, Line 8 Phase 2 finished tunnel work for the Longgang to Lianhua section. Line 8 Phase 2 entered the railroad construction, electrics, and refurbishment stage.
- On 28 March 2023, Line 19 Phase 2 finished the 160 km/h high-speed train testing, entering 1–2 months of systematic testing.
- On 28 March 2023, the Chengdu Rail Transit 2023 Annual Media Gala was held in Wenjiashan Station on Line 19.
- On 29 March 2023, construction for the left tunnel between Baotai Avenue and Changhong Square on Line S3 finished.
- On 30 March 2023, the tunnel boring machine used for the Jiuyanqiao-Xinnanmen section of Line 13 makes a breakthrough.
- On 30 March 2023, Line 19 Phase 2 finished construction and is handed over to the operation team for operational testing.
- On 30 March 2023, Chengdu Metro and Shanghai Metro's QR Code ticketing systems were officially unified and connected.
- On 31 March 2023, Line 30 Phase 1's Gaobeiba Depot (高碑坝车辆段) was powered on.
- From January to March 2023, Chengdu Metro TOD initiated four new land projects covering 200,000 square meters, along with 23 TOD projects and 38 new construction project sections.
- On 26 May 2023, all 45 trains of Line 19 Phase 2 were delivered.
- On 31 May 2023, Line S3 (Ziyang Line) began mechanical and electrical work after completing line construction.
- On 11 September 2023, Line 30 Phase 1's longest station – Terminal 2 of Shuangliu International Airport East – finished structure construction, marking the 23rd station to complete structure contraction.
- On 17 September 2023, the original Line 17 Phase 1 (Jinxing – Jitouqiao) split into Line 19 Phase 1 (Jinxing – Jiujiang North) and new Line 17 (Jiujiang North – Jitouqiao). A 4-Car A-Train started operating on Line 17, and all passengers were required to transfer at the same platform at Jiujiang North between lines 17 and 19.
- On 20 September 2023, Line 13's first train was finished. This marked Chengdu's second metro line to use driverless automatic trains.
- On 22 September 2023, Line 30 Phase 1 finished tunnel construction.
- On 26 September 2023, Line 18 and Line 19 began co-operational testing.
- On 30 September 2023, Line 17 Phase 2's People's Park Station finished structure construction.
- On 3 October 2023, Line 17 Phase 2's Qingshuihedaqiao-Huanhuali stations completed both tunnel construction.
- On 28 November 2023, Line 19 Phase 2 opens, extending the line from Jiujiang North to Tianfu Station.

==== 2024 ====
- On 8 April 2024, Line 6's Qingdao Road station was put into operation.
- On 29 September 2024, Line S3 started operation.
- On 19 December 2024, Line 27 and phase 2 of Line 8 started operation.

==== 2025 ====
- On 17 September 2025, Line 10 Phase 3 (initial section) entered service, extending the line from Taipingyuan to Wuhou Shrine. Line 17 Phase 2 entered service, extending the line from Jitouqiao to Gaohong.
- On 16 December 2025, Line 13 Phase 1 and Line 30 Phase 1 entered service.

=== Fifth phase projects ===
==== 2023 ====
- On 13 January 2023, the Chengdu Government published the fifth phase expansion and the environmental assessment for Chengdu Metro. The Fifth Phase plan consists of 199.8 km (124.1 mi) of 10 new lines, including Line 5 Phase 3, Line 9 Phase 2, Line 10 Phase 4, Line 12 Phase 1, Line 16 Phase 1, Line 18 Phase 4, Line 20 Phase 1, Line 22 Phase 1, Line 23 Phase 1, and Line 27 Phase 2.
- On 15 February 2023, Line S11 was approved by the Sichuan Development and Reform Commission.
- On 30 March 2023, Line S11 (Chengdu – Deyang Line) started construction. This line is planned to open in 2026, consisting of a 70.84 km route with a 45.30 km elevated section, a 23.91 km underground section, and a 1.63 km transit section.
- On 31 March 2023, Chengdu Metro reached 1 billion ridership, as a rider entered the gate at 15:29:16.
- On 6 September 2023, Line S11 started construction at Banzhuyuan Station in Xindu.
- On 6 September 2023, Chengdu Metro debuted Train Maintenance Bots (车辆巡检机器人), AI-Railway Maintenance Bots (轨道智能巡检机器人), and Power-line Surveillance AI (弓网在线监测装置) on Line 19. This marks the world's first AI-Maintenance Robot & System. Chengdu Metro aims to implement full AI-Operation by 2025.

== Network expansion ==
=== Lines under construction ===
Map of Chengdu Metro plan (2025)

As of December 2025, these are the lines that have been approved and are under construction.

Est. Opening	Line	Phase	Terminals		Length (km)	Stations	Notes
2027	S5	Phase 1	Honglian	Meishan East Railway Station	59.315	13	
2027	18	Phase 3 North Section	North Railway Station	South Railway Station	10.99	4	
2027	18	Phase 3 Guanyan Section	Tianfu International Airport North	Guanyan	2.57	1	
2028	S11	Phase 1	Deyang Railway Station	Weijianian	70.845	16	
2031	10	Phase 3	Wuhou Shrine	Luomashi	0.57	3	

=== Lines yet to start construction ===
The Chengdu Metro Phase 5 construction plan (2024–2029) was announced in 2023.

Line	Phase	Terminals		Length (km)	Stations
5	Phase 3	Huilong	Yongan	6.5	4
9	Phase 2	Financial City East	Huangtianba	45.0	26
10	Phase 4	People's Park	Bailianchi	10.1	8
12	Phase 1	Deyuan	Yujialaofangzi	38.75	32
16	Phase 1	Huaxiba	Shaba'er	37.5	22
18	Phase 4	North Railway Station	Fengtai 3rd Road	7.1	3
18	Phase 4	Guanyan	Jianyang South Station	7.1	3
20	Phase 1	Yinglong	Baihelin	18.3	13
22	Phase 1	Linjiangcun	Yinglong	9.7	10
23	Phase 1	Tianfu 1st Road	Panda Paradise	24.8	18
27	Phase 2	Shuxin Road	Huangtianba	2.08	3

=== Long-term planning ===
In December 2020, Chengdu Municipal Bureau of Planning and Natural Resources announced the long-term planning including Lines 1–33, D1-D6 and S1-S19.

== Fares ==
=== Single ride card ===
Single Ride Card is an IC card for one trip. Riders can buy it through attendants in station's Service Centers or use ticket-vending machines. One ticket allows only one rider in with validity of the same day. If riders have not used the Single Ride Card, they may refund it at the same day at the same station.

From its opening until 1 June 2017, Chengdu Metro used a fare system based on station counts. With a 2-hour grace period in the subway system. In October 2016, Chengdu Metro held public meeting for price changing issues and set new pricing plans.

Since 2 June 2017, Chengdu Metro has used a new fare system based on distance.

Distance (km)	Distance to next price level (km)	Total Price (CNY 元)
0～4	4	¥2
4～8	4	¥3
8～12	4	¥4
12～18	6	¥5
18～24	6	¥6
24～32	8	¥7
32～40	8	¥8
40～50	10	¥9
When the trip is longer than 50 km, each additional 20 km requires another ¥1
Each rider has a 3-hour grace period in the system.

=== Reloadable IC cards ===
The Tianfutong Pass is a reloadable IC Card accepted by the Chengdu Metro. Normal Tianfutong Passes provide 10% discounts. Student Tianfutong Passes provide 50% discounts. Senior Tianfutong Passes have special discounts depending on time of use. Additionally, passengers can pay for single rides directly using Debit IC cards offered by participating banks.

=== EMV cards ===
On 28 July 2025, Chengdu Metro started accepting EMV payments for both domestic and international bank cards on all lines. Cards issued by Visa, Mastercard, American Express, and UnionPay are supported. Only Visa, MasterCard, American Express cards issued outside Mainland China are accepted..This makes Chengdu only the third city in the mainland China (after Beijing and Shanghai) that provides this 'tap and ride' service using both domestic and international bank cards.

== Train types and technology ==
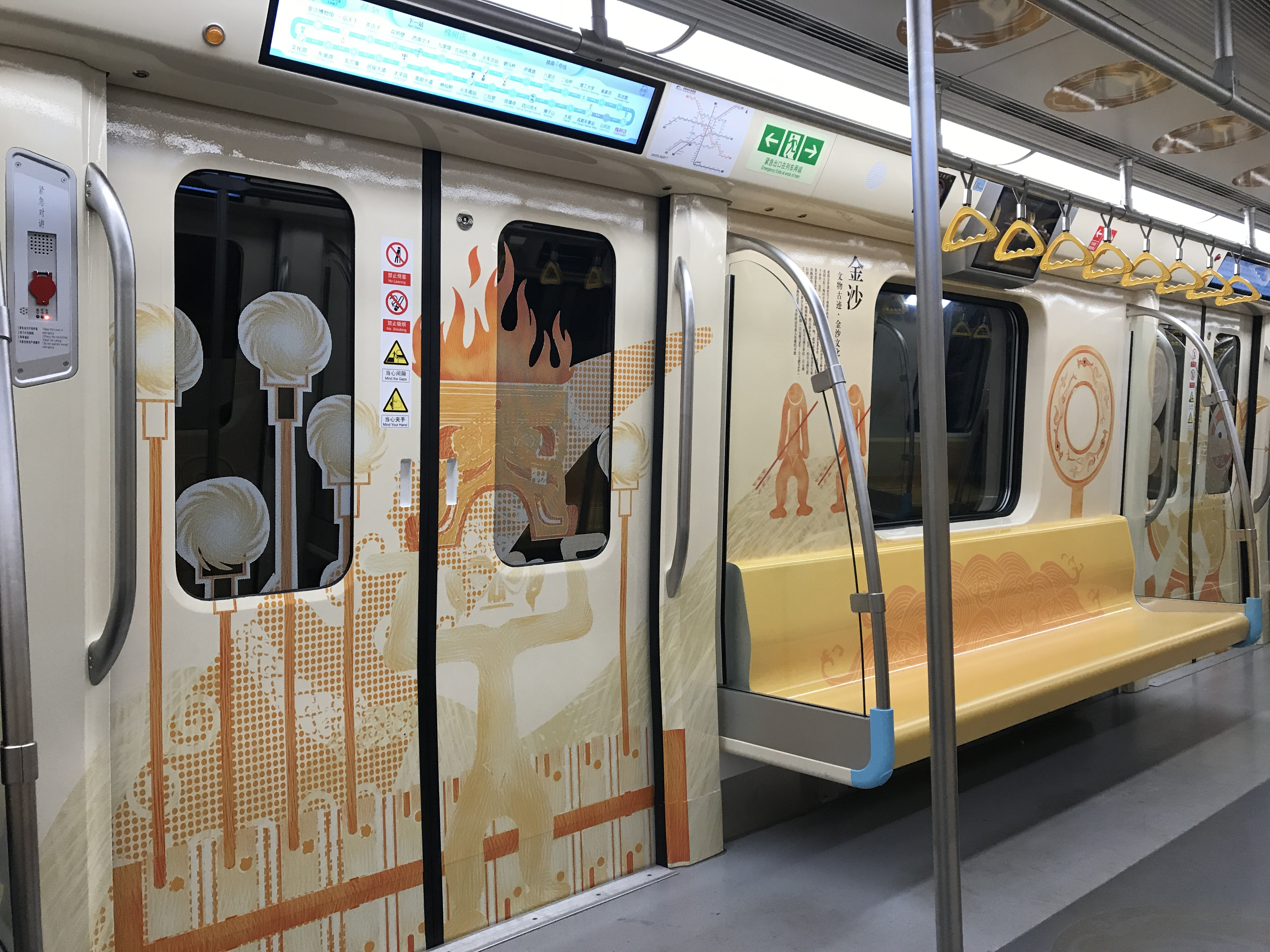
The interior of a Line 7 train showing local ancient Sanxingdui/Jinsha culture.

All "standard" Chengdu Metro lines in operation run on 1,500 V DC supplied by overhead lines. Express lines meanwhile run on 25 kV AC to get to top speed quicker. Trains on Lines 3, 4, 7, 10 and some of the newer Line 2 trains have a Golden Sun Bird insignia. New trains are equipped with LCD passenger information systems.

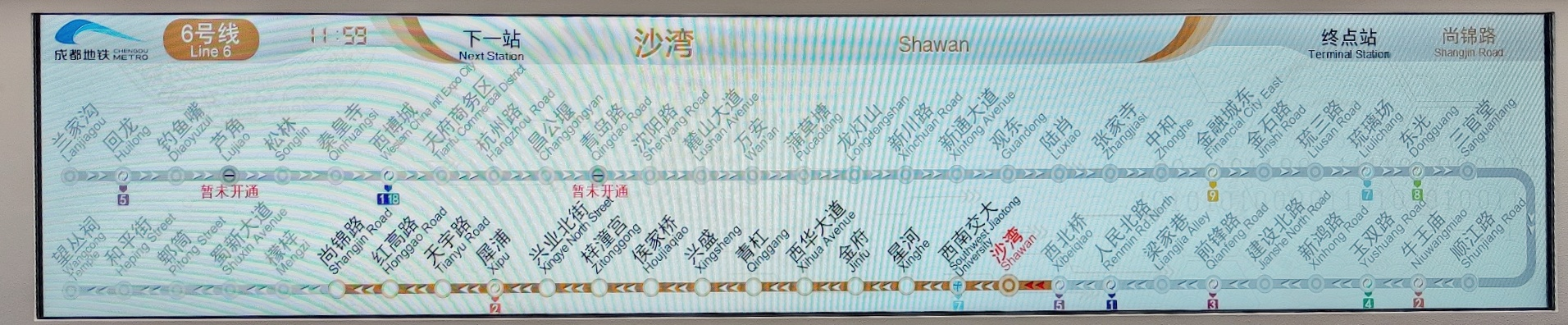
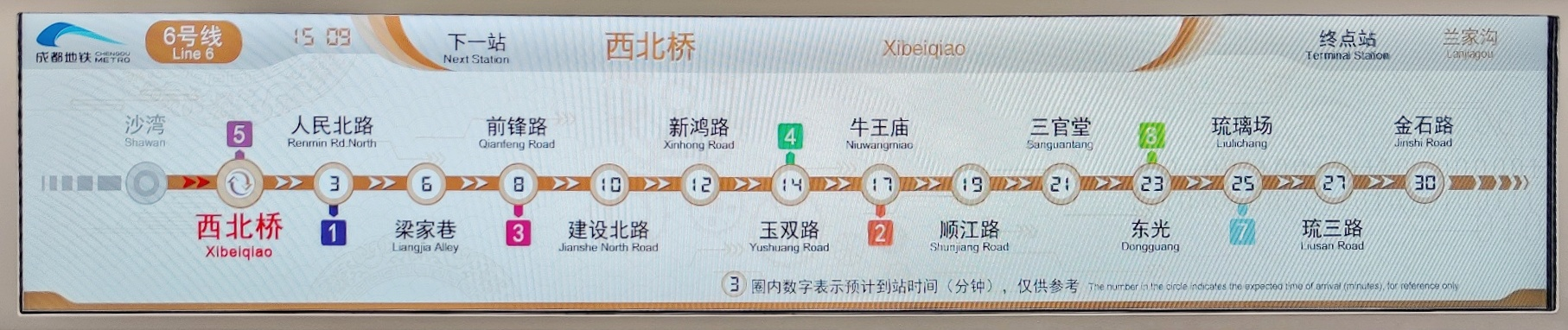
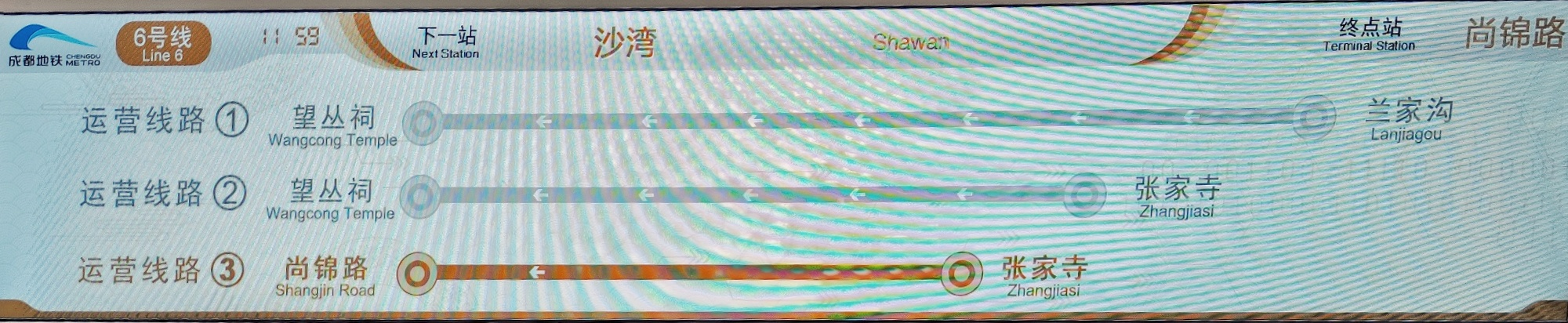

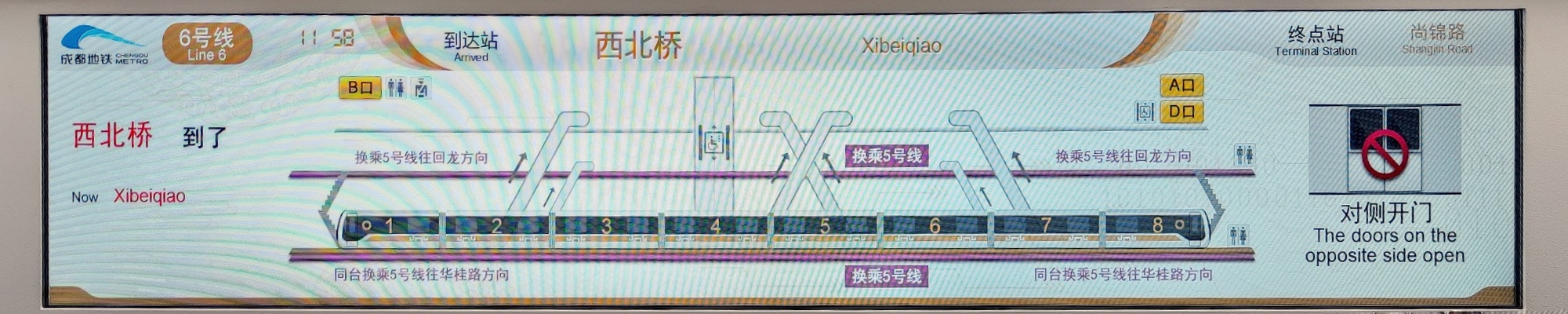
Line 6 Train LCD Passenger Information System

=== Signalling system ===
All Chengdu Metro lines are equipped with CBTC. Chengdu Metro Line 1, which opened to traffic in 2010, used a CBTC signaling system provided by Zhejiang Zhonghe Technology, a subsidiary of Zhejiang University, in collaboration with Ansaldo STS. This system is also used on Chengdu Metro Line 6 and 10. Chengdu Metro Line 3, which opened in 2016, was one of the first adoptions of a domestic CBTC signal system implementation by Beijing Traffic Control Technology. Beijing Traffic Control Technology's CBTC system is also used in Line 5. Alstom's Urbalis 888 CBTC signal system in collaboration with CASCO is used on Line 18, 19, Chengdu Light Rail Line 2 and the fully automated GoA4 Line 9.

=== Type A trains ===
In response to congestion and high ridership, Lines 7, 8 and 10 are equipped with higher capacity 6-car aluminum alloy Type A trains. The total length of 140 metres (459 ft 4 in) and width is 3 metres (9 ft 10 in). All trains have a maximum operating speed of 80 km/h (50 mph). The capacity of a 6-car train is 1,828 passengers with a crush load capacity of 2,488 passengers. Line 7 trains are designed and managed by CRRC Qingdao Sifang with CRRC Chengdu performing manufacturing and assembly. Lines 5, 6 and 9 are equipped with even higher capacity eight car aluminum alloy Type A trains. The capacity of an eight car trainset is 2,480 passengers with a crush load capacity of 3,456 passengers.

=== Type B trains ===
Lines 1, 2, 3 and 4 use six car stainless steel Type B trains with a total length of 120 metres (393 ft 8 in) and width 2.8 metres (9 ft 2 in). The capacity of each train set is 1,460 people with a crush load capacity of 1,880 passengers. All trains have a maximum operating speed of 80 km/h (50 mph). Lines 1 and 2 use CRRC Qingdao Sifang and CRRC Chengdu trains. Trains on Line 3 and 4 are manufactured by CRRC Changchun Railway Vehicles and CRRC Chengdu. In 2008, Chengdu Metro in anticipation of the opening of Line 1, purchased and initial order of 17 six car trains sets from CRRC Qingdao Sifang. In April 2011, a further order was announced for trains from CRRC for Line 2, taking the total to 59 six car sets.

=== Light rail trains ===
Currently, only Chengdu Light Rail Line 2 is in operation. Light Rail Line 2 uses low floor light rail trains provided by domestic manufacturer CRRC. The tram system uses light rail trains, of each having 5 cars and 8 doors. Chengdu Light Rail Line R2 opened to public on 26 December 2018 and extended on 27 December 2019. It is 39.3 km (24.4 mi) long, with 35 stations (47 station when completed). In early 2020, this line is included in the latest Chengdu Metro's official system map.

== Other rail transit ==
=== High-speed intercity rail ===
There are also two high-speed intercity railways in Chengdu, not part of Chengdu Metro system: the Chengdu–Dujiangyan intercity railway and Chengdu–Pujiang intercity railway. They are operated by Chengdu Metropolitan Railway Company Limited, which is China's first joint venture between a local government and China's national rail operator. The city and the Ministry of Railways worked together in building high-speed intercity rail lines.

== See also ==
- List of metro systems
- Urban rail transit in China
