= Chengdu First People's Hospital station =

Metro station in Chengdu, China

Coordinates: 30.5922°N 104.0482°E

Chengdu First People's Hospital 市一医院
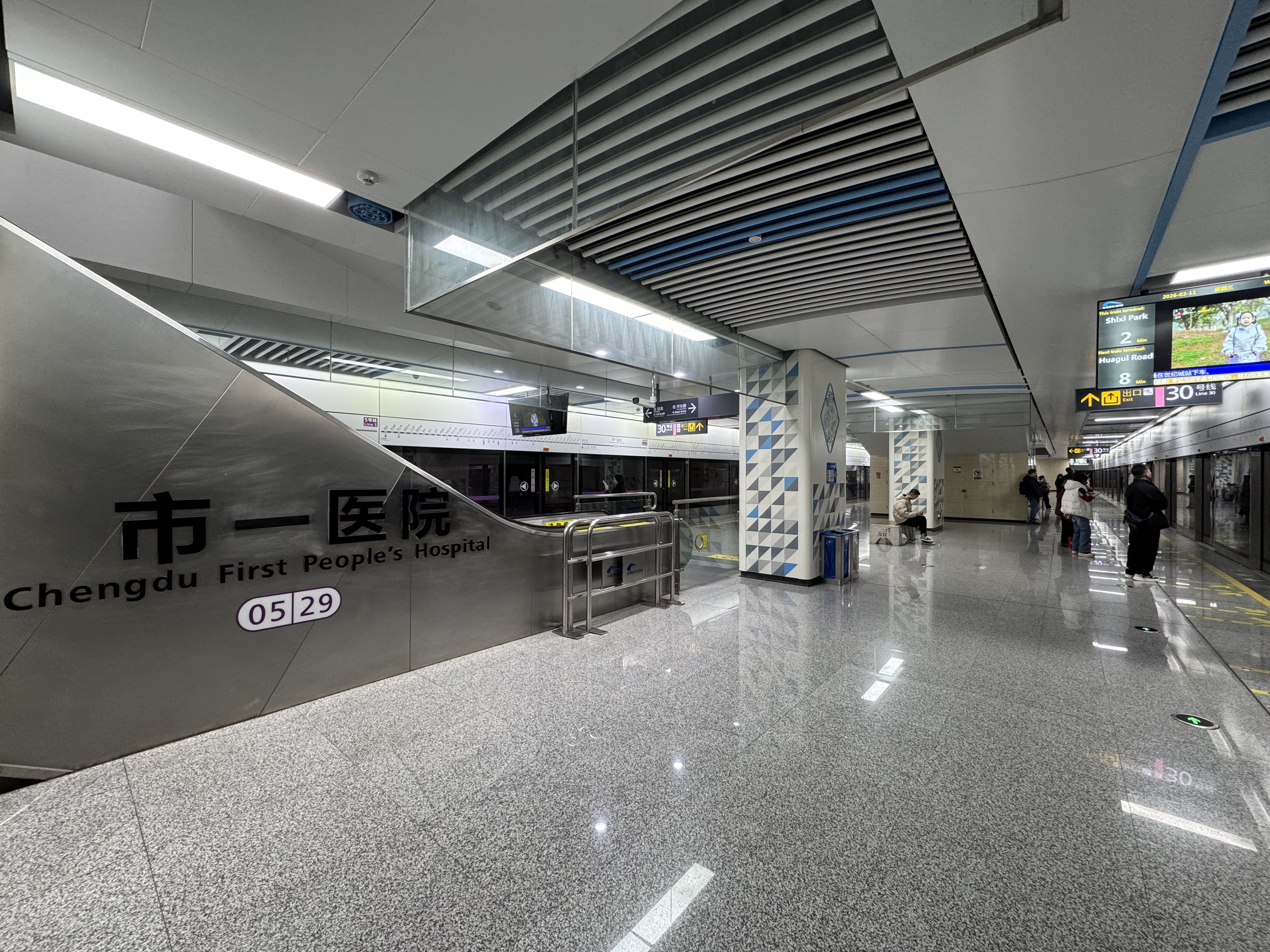
- Line 5 platform

General information
- Location: High-Tech Zone, Chengdu, Sichuan; China
- Operated by: Chengdu Metro Limited
- Lines: Line 5 Line 30
- Platforms: 4 (2 island platforms)

Other information
- Station code: 0529; 3015

History
- Opened: 27 December 2019 (Line 5); 16 December 2025 (Line 30)

Services
Preceding station	Chengdu Metro	Following station
Shiyang Flyover towards Huagui Road	Line 5	Jiaozi Avenue towards Huilong
Yizhou Avenue towards Longquanyi Railway Station South	Line 30	Xinyuan Avenue towards East of Terminal 2 of Shuangliu International Airport
Location

Chengdu First People's Hospital (Chinese: 市一医院) is a station on Line 5 and Line 30 of the Chengdu Metro in China. It was opened on 27 December 2019.

== Gallery ==
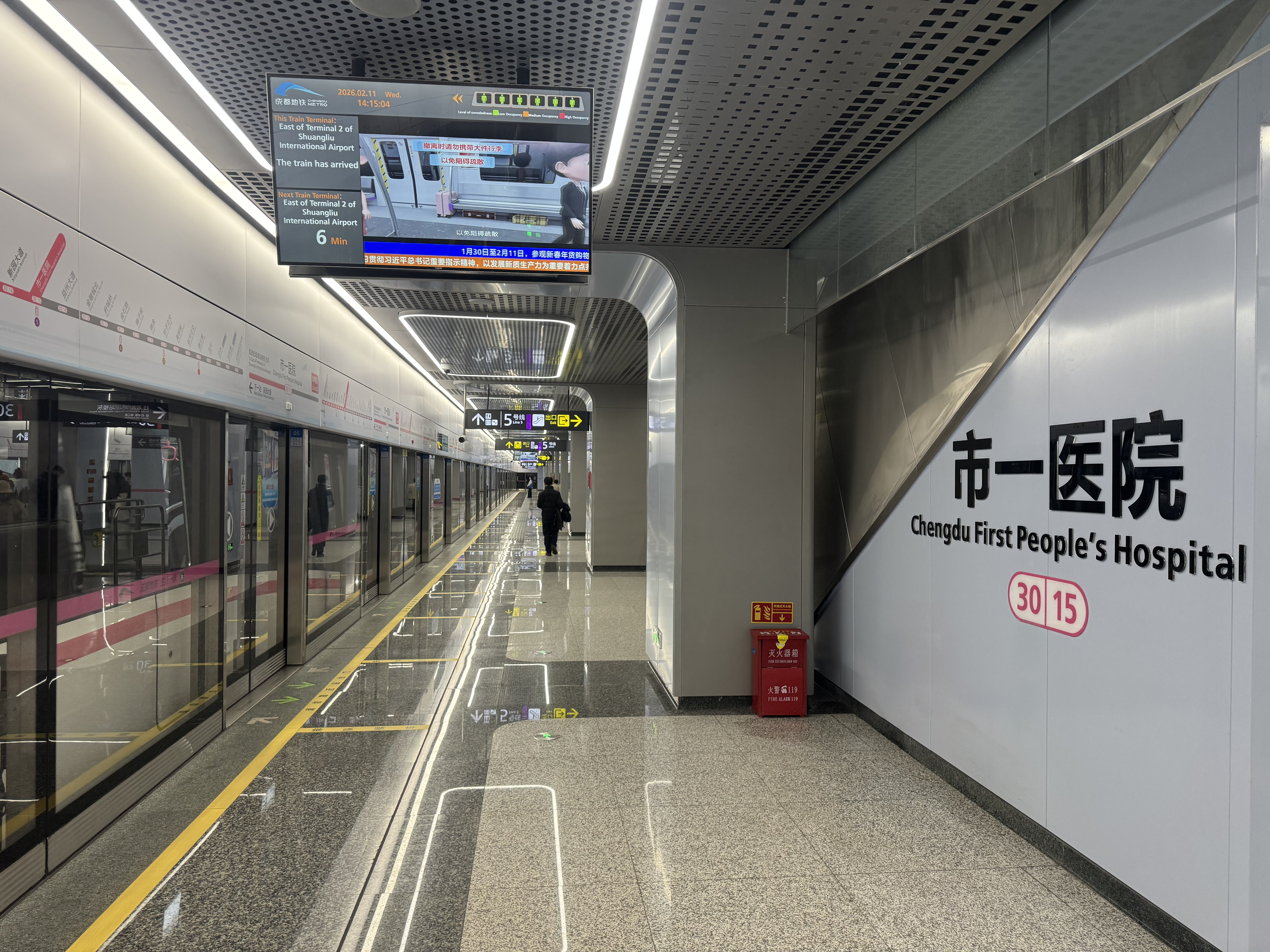
Line 30 platform
