= Daguan station =

Daguan station may refer to these stations:

- Daguan station (Chengdu Metro) (simplified Chinese: 大观站; traditional Chinese: 大觀站), a station of Line 7 (Chengdu Metro)
- Daguan station (Hangzhou Metro) (simplified Chinese: 大关站; traditional Chinese: 大關站), a station of Line 3 (Hangzhou Metro)
