= Line 30 =

Line 30 may refer to:

- CFL Line 30
- Line 30 (Chengdu Metro), a metro line of the Chengdu Metro in China
