= Shizishan station =

Shizishan station can refer to:

- Shizishan station (Chengdu Metro), a metro station in Chengdu, China
- Shizishan station (Suzhou Rail Transit), a metro station in Suzhou, China

== See also ==
- Shishan station (disambiguation)
