= Shishan station =

Shishan station may refer to:

- Shishan railway station, a railway station in Foshan, Guangdong Province, China
- Shishan station (Foshan Metro), a metro station currently under construction on Line 3 of Foshan Metro in Foshan, Guangdong Province, China
- Shishan station (Ningbo Rail Transit), a metro station on the Line 3 of the Ningbo Rail Transit in Ningbo, Zhejiang Province, China

== See also ==
- Shizishan station (disambiguation)
