= Jingjusi station =

Metro station in Chengdu, China

Jingjusi 净居寺
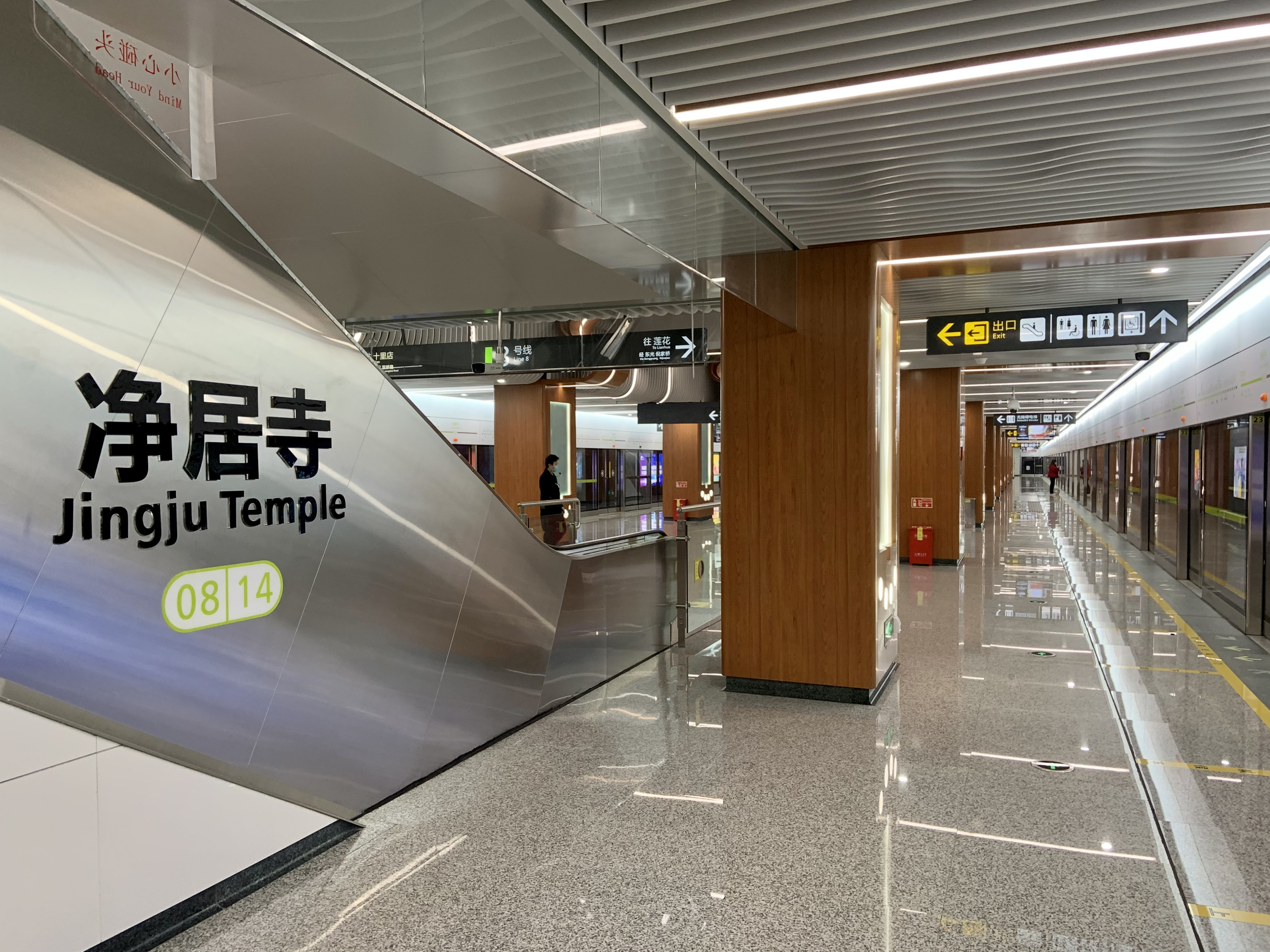

General information
- Location: Jingjusi Street West × Jingjusi Road; Jinjiang District, Chengdu, Sichuan; China
- Coordinates: 30°37′29″N 104°06′07″E
- Operated by: Chengdu Metro Limited
- Lines: Line 8 Line 13
- Platforms: 4 (2 island platforms)

Construction
- Structure type: Underground
- Accessible: Yes

Other information
- Station code: 0814 1307

History
- Opened: 18 December 2020 (Line 8); 16 December 2025 (Line 13)
- Previous names: Jingju Temple

Services
Preceding station	Chengdu Metro	Following station
Dongdalu Road towards Guilong Road	Line 8	Dongguang towards Longgang
Sichuan Normal University towards Long'an	Line 13	Sanguantang towards Wayaotan
Location

Jingju Temple Station , formerly known as Jingju Temple Station, is a metro station at Chengdu, Sichuan, China. It was opened on December 18, 2020 for Line 8 and December 16, 2025 for Line 13.

== Gallery ==
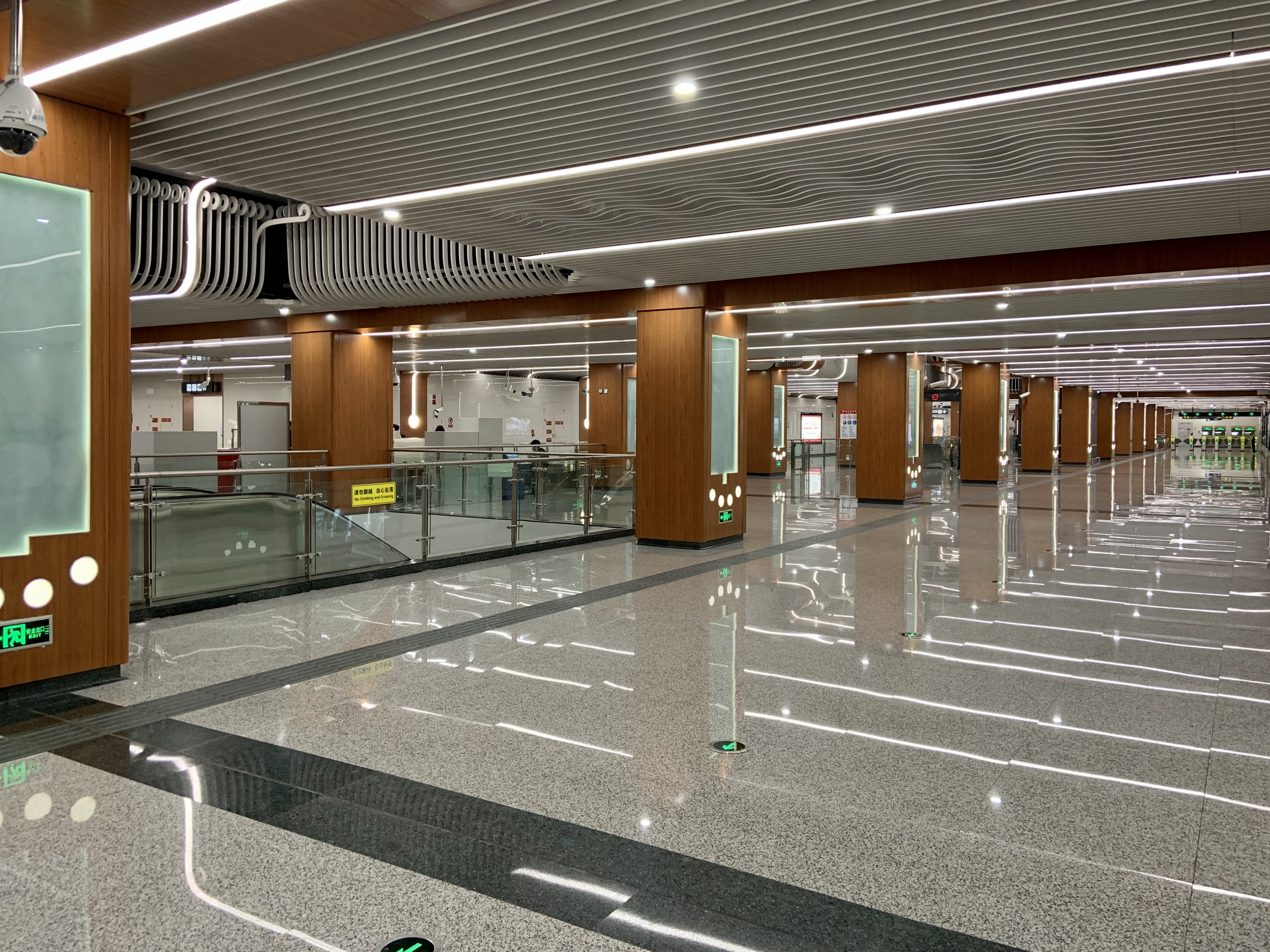
Line 8 concourse

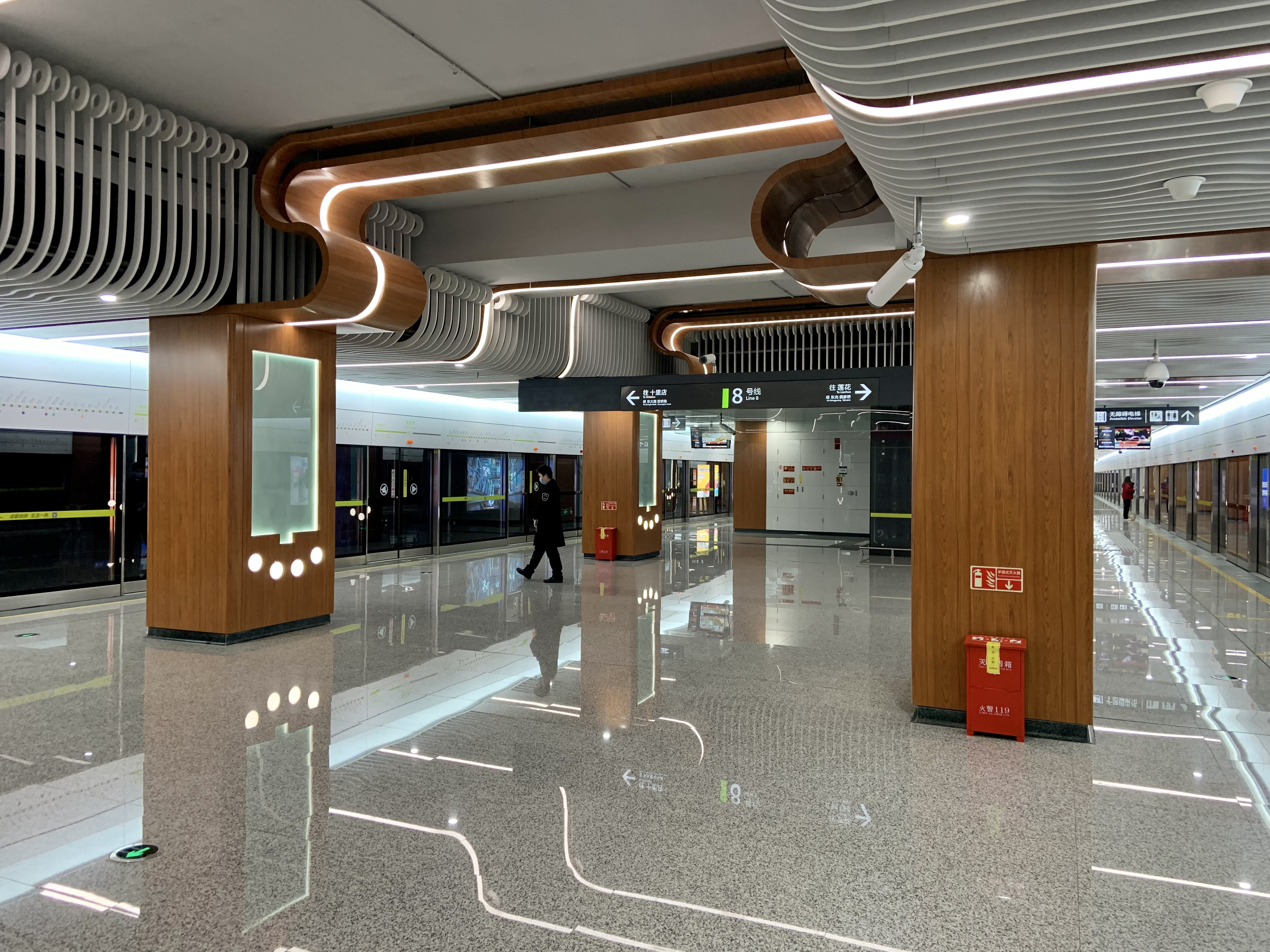
Line 8 platform
