= Qingyang Taoist Temple station =

Metro station in Chengdu, China

Qingyang Taoist Temple 青羊宫
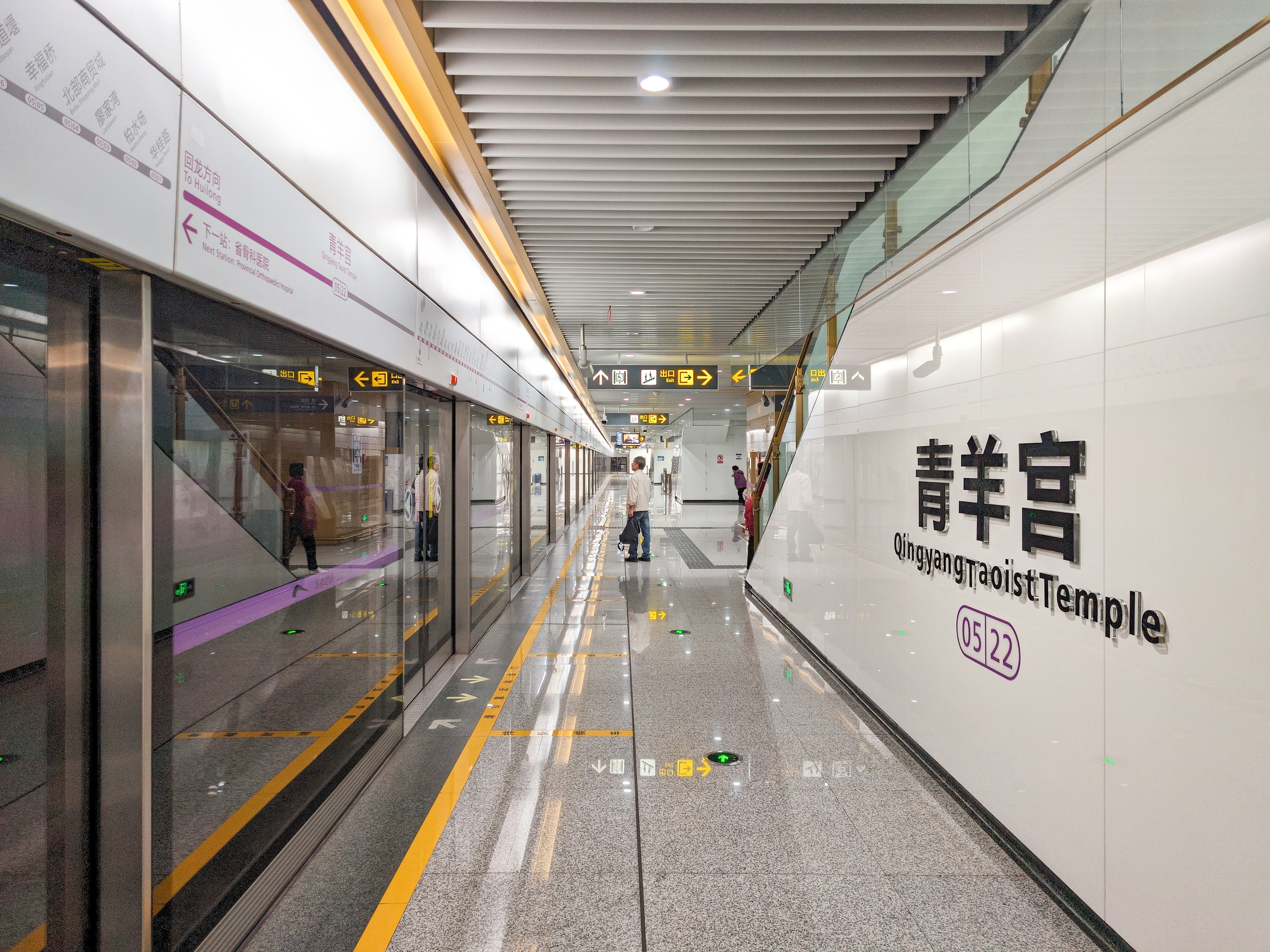

General information
- Location: Qingyang District, Chengdu, Sichuan; China
- Coordinates: 30.66307°N 104.03837°E
- Operated by: Chengdu Metro Limited
- Lines: Line 5 Line 13
- Platforms: 4 (2 island platforms)

Other information
- Station code: 0522; 1314

History
- Opened: 27 December 2019 (Line 5); 16 December 2025 (Line 13)

Services
Preceding station	Chengdu Metro	Following station
Chengdu University of TCM & Sichuan Provincial People's Hospital towards Huagui Road	Line 5	Provincial Orthopaedics Hospital towards Huilong
Xiaonan Street towards Long'an	Line 13	Du Fu Thatched College towards Wayaotan
Location

Qingyang Taoist Temple (Chinese: 青羊宫) is a station on Line 5 and Line 13 of the Chengdu Metro in China. It was opened on 27 December 2019.
