= Line 13 (Chengdu Metro) =

Metro line in Chengdu, China

Overview
- Status: Operational
- Owner: Chengdu
- Locale: Chengdu, China
- Termini: Wayaotan; Long'an
- Stations: 21

Service
- Type: Rapid transit
- System: Chengdu Metro
- Services: 1
- Operator(s): Chengdu Metro Limited
- Rolling stock: 8-car Type A (Driverless)

History
- Opened: 16 December 2025; 4 months ago

Technical
- Line length: 29.07 km (18.06 mi)
- Number of tracks: 2
- Character: Underground
- Track gauge: 1,435 mm (4 ft 8 1/2 in)
- Electrification: Overhead catenary, 25 kV AC
- Operating speed: 100 kilometres per hour (62 mph) (maximum)

Line 13 of the Chengdu Metro (Chinese: 成都地铁13号线) is a metro line in Chengdu, Sichuan, China. The first phase of the line officially opened on 16 December 2025. This entire section is underground. Line 13 is the first Chengdu Metro line using AC system fully automatic operation and Line 13 rolling stock is the first urban fully automatic train with a maximum designed speed of 140 km/h in China.

== History ==
- On 11 November 2019, construction on line 13 began.
- On 16 December 2022, Line 13 Phase 1 finished Sanguantang to Jiuyan Bridge Section tunnel construction, marking the success of the longest underwater/river tunnel work in Chengdu Metro history.
- On 13 January 2023, 15 stations finished structural construction and tunnel finished 62%, railroad finished 10%
- On 30 March 2023, Line 13 Jiuyan Bridge~Xinnanmen section's tunnel boring machine finished construction.
- On 20 September 2023, Line 13's first train is finished. This is Chengdu's second metro line to use driverless automatic trains.
- On 16 December 2025, Line 13 Phase 1 entered service.

== Incidents ==
- In June 2024 a part of Line 13 collapsed, destroying the road above.

== Opening timeline ==
Segment	Commencement	Length	Stations	Name
Wayaotan — Long'an	16 December 2025	29.07 km (18.06 mi)	21	Phase 1

== Stations ==
Station name		Connections
English	Chinese	Connections
Wayaotan	瓦窑滩	
Wanjiawan	万家湾	
Peifeng	培风	9
Wanshou Bridge	万寿桥	
Dongpo Road	东坡路	7
Guanghuacun	光华村	
Du Fu Thatched Cottage	杜甫草堂	
Qingyang Taoist Temple	青羊宫	5
Xiaonan Street	小南街	17
Wenweng Shishi	文翁石室	10
Huaxiba	华西坝	1
Xinnanmen	新南门	3
Jiuyan Bridge	九眼桥	
Sanguantang	三官堂	6
Jingjusi	净居寺	8
Sichuan Normal University	四川师大	7
Jiaozi Flyover	娇子立交	30
Xingfu Meilin	幸福梅林	
Sansheng Flower Town	三圣花乡	
Longhuasi	龙华寺	
Long'an	龙安	
