= Sanguantang station (Chengdu Metro) =

Metro station in Chengdu, China

Sanguantang 三官堂
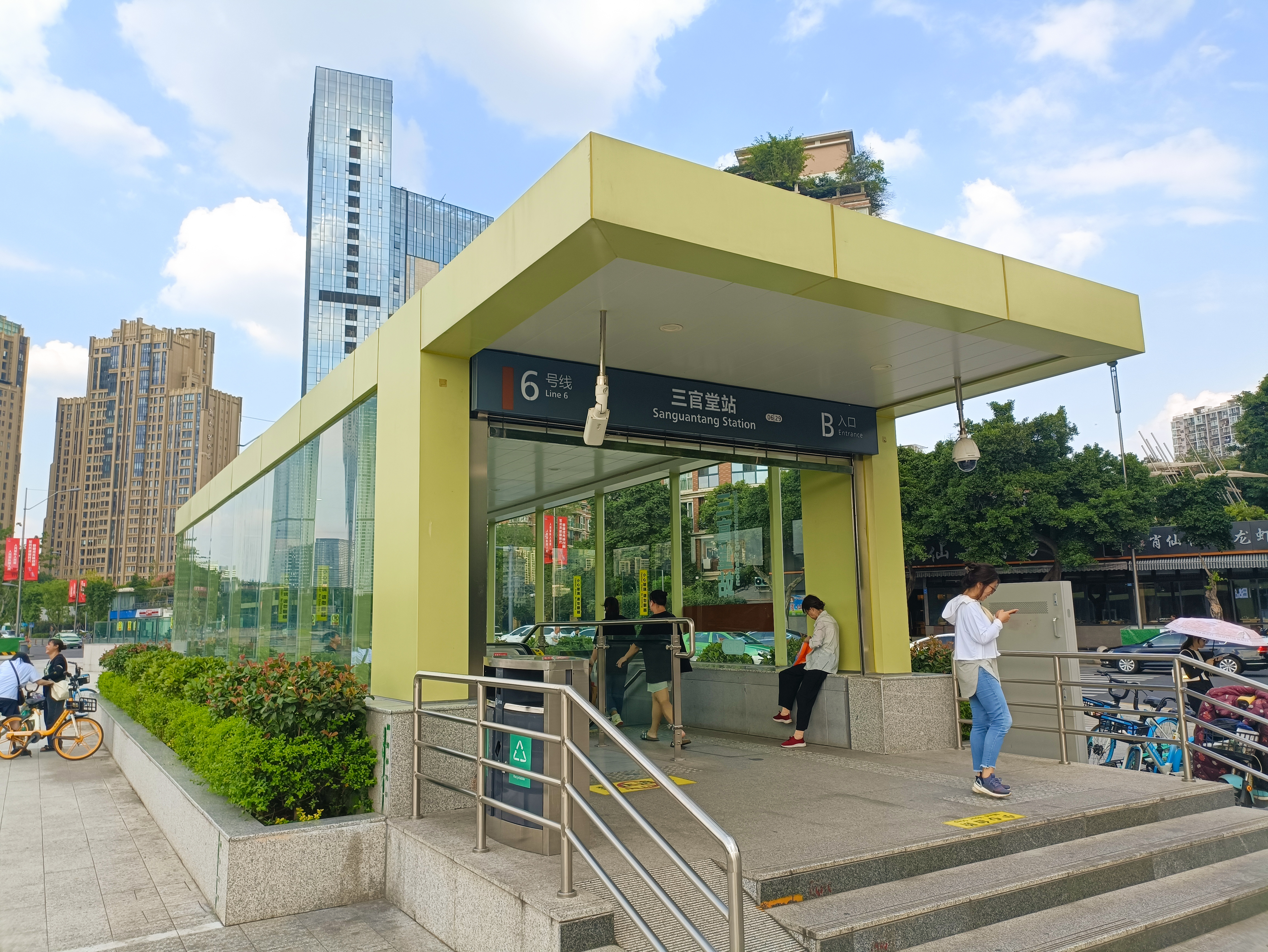
- Entrance B

General information
- Location: Jinjiang District, Chengdu, Sichuan; China
- Coordinates: 30.63082°N 104.09213°E
- Operated by: Chengdu Metro Limited
- Lines: Line 6 Line 13
- Platforms: 4 (2 island platforms)

Other information
- Station code: 0629; 1308

History
- Opened: 18 December 2020 (Line 6); 16 December 2025 (Line 13)

Services
Preceding station	Chengdu Metro	Following station
Shunjiang Road towards Wangcong Temple	Line 6	Dongguang towards Lanjiagou
Jingjusi towards Long'an	Line 13	Jiuyan Bridge towards Wayaotan
Location

Sanguantang Station is a metro station at Chengdu, Sichuan, China. It opened on December 18, 2020 for Line 6 and December 16, 2025 for Line 13.
