= Sichuan Normal University station =

Chengdu Metro station

Sichuan Normal University 四川师大
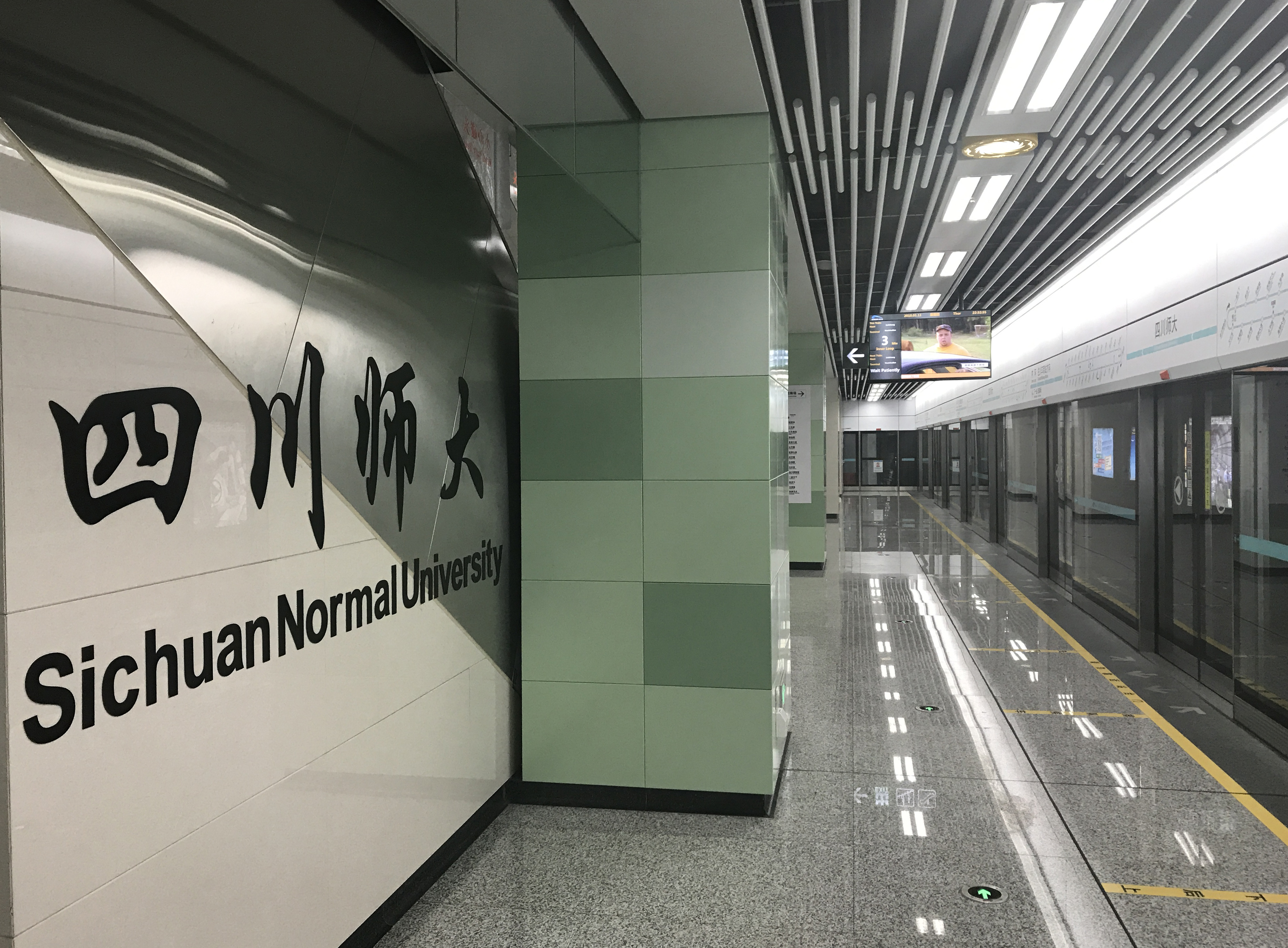

General information
- Location: Jinjiang District, Chengdu, Sichuan; China
- Operator: Chengdu Metro Limited
- Lines: Line 7 Line 13
- Platforms: 4 (2 island platforms)

Other information
- Station code: 0719 1306

History
- Opened: 6 December 2017 (Line 7); 16 December 2025 (Line 13)

Services
Preceding station	Chengdu Metro	Following station
Liulichang Clockwise	Line 7	Shizishan Anticlockwise
Jiaozi Flyover towards Long'an	Line 13	Jingjusi towards Wayaotan
Location

Sichuan Normal University (Chinese: 四川师大) is a station on Line 7 and Line 13 of the Chengdu Metro in China. It was opened on 6 December 2017. The station serves the nearby Sichuan Normal University.

== Station layout ==
G	Entrances and Exits	Exits A-C, D1, D3, E-F, G1, G2
B1	Concourse	Faregates, Station Agent
B2	Eastbound	← Line 13 to Long'an (Jiaozi Flyover)
B2	Island platform, doors open on the left
B2	Westbound	Line 13 to Wayaotan (Jingjusi) →
B3	Clockwise	← Line 7 to Cuijiadian (Liulichang)
B3	Island platform, doors open on the left
B3	Counterclockwise	Line 7 to Cuijiadian (Shizishan) →

== Gallery ==
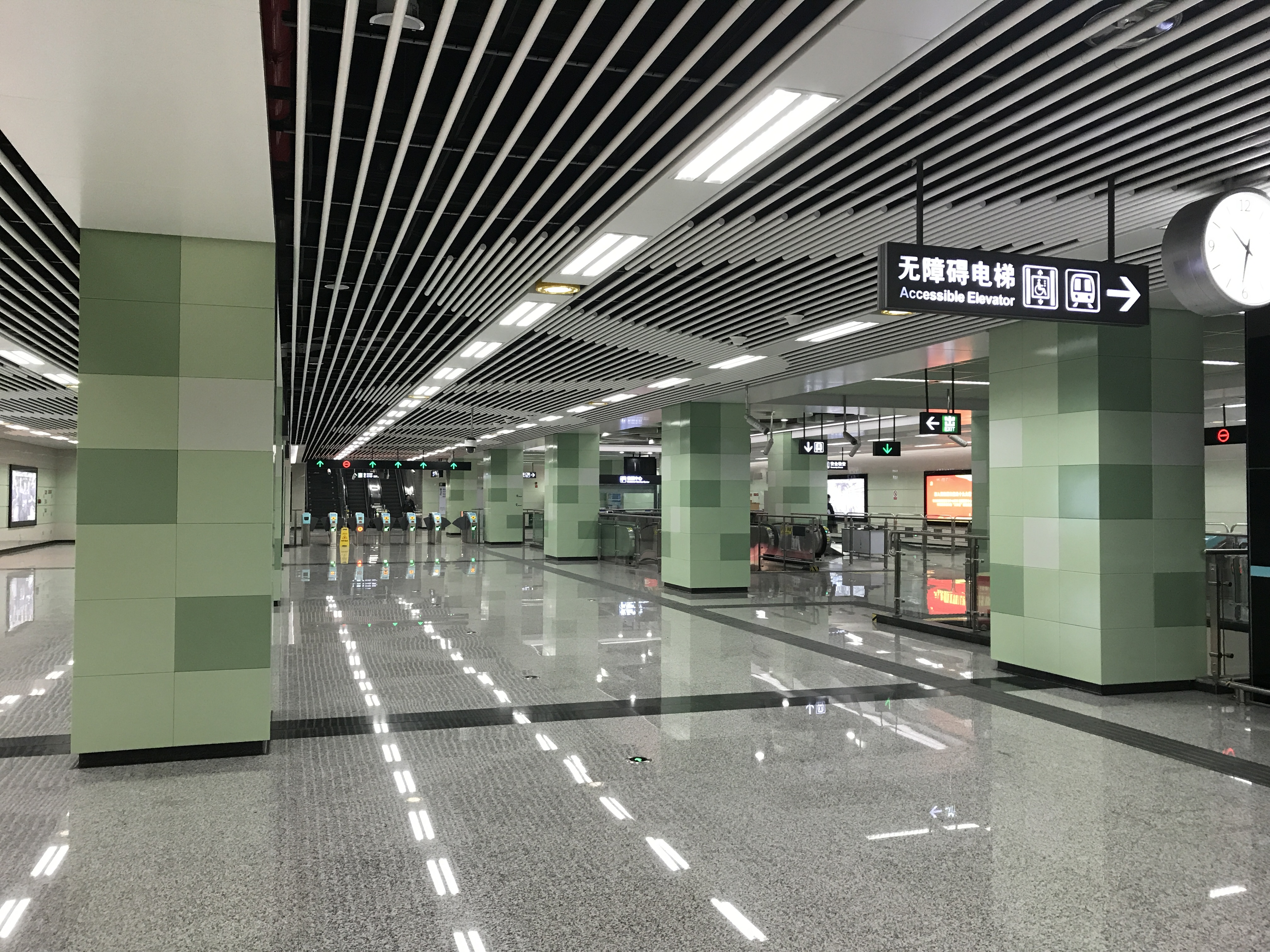
Concourse

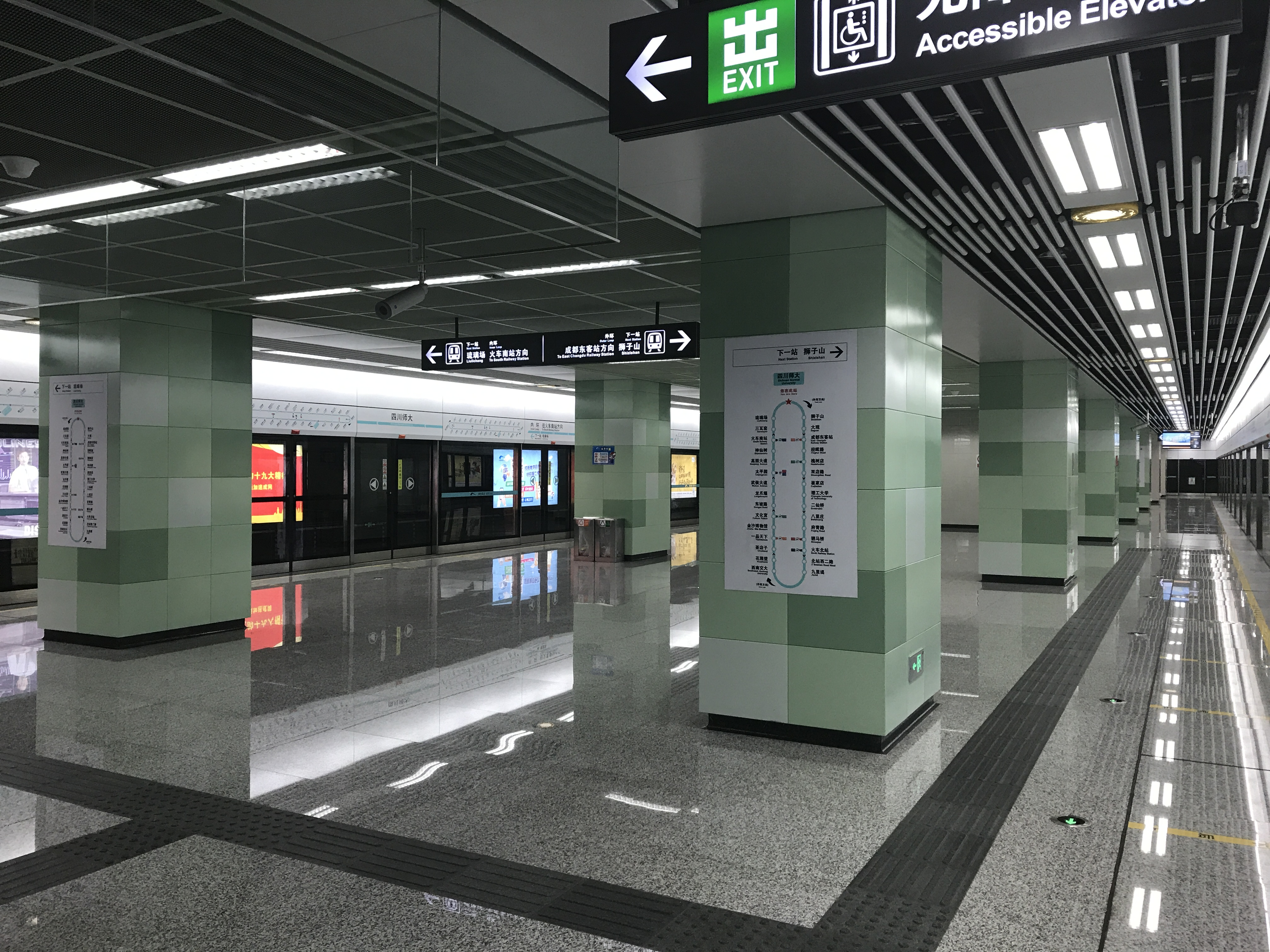
Platform
