= Liulichang station =

Chengdu Metro station

Liulichang 琉璃场
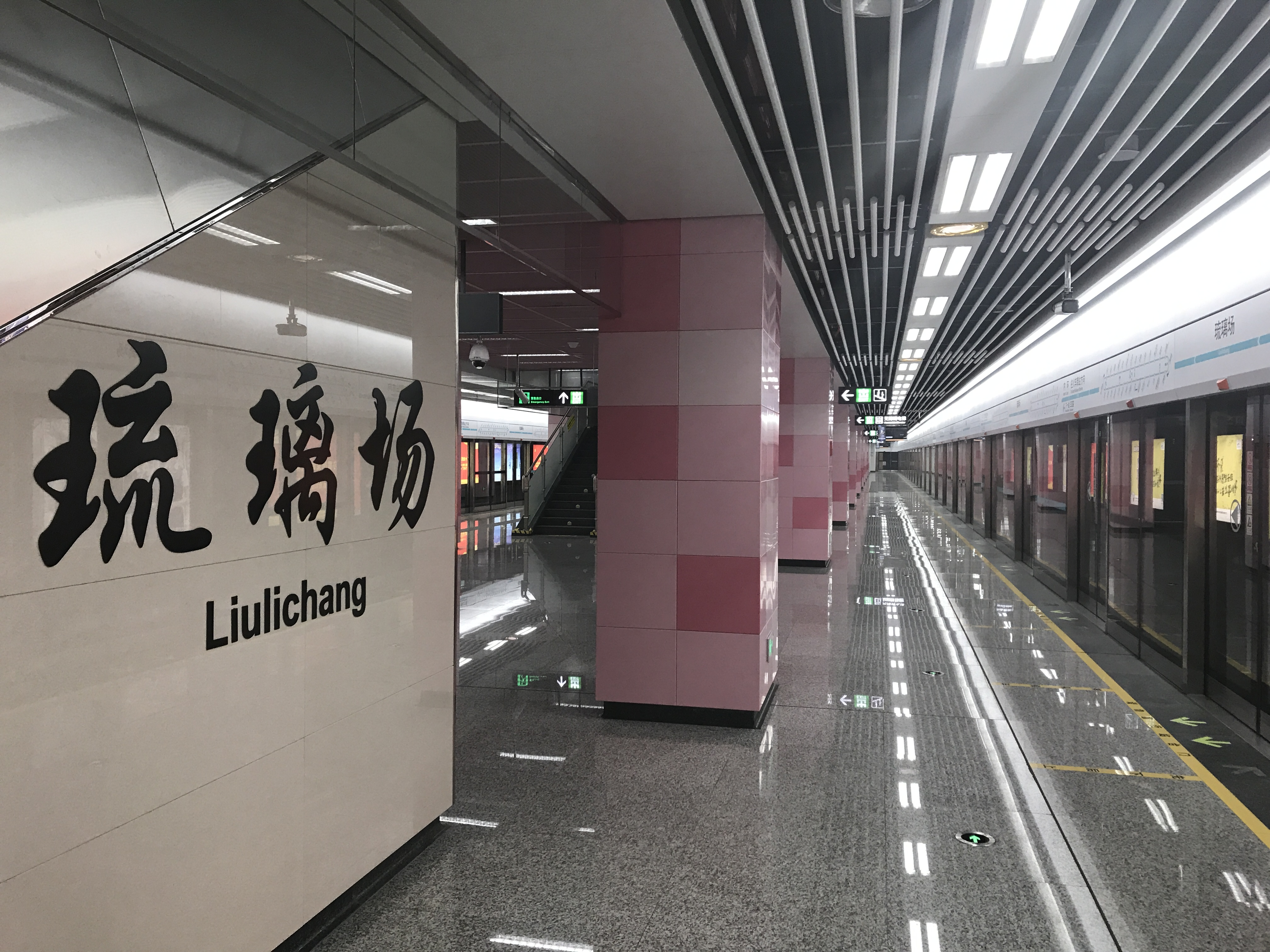
- Line 7 platform

General information
- Location: Jinjiang District, Chengdu, Sichuan; China
- Operator: Chengdu Metro Limited
- Lines: Line 6 Line 7
- Platforms: 4 (2 island platforms)

Other information
- Station code: 0631 0718

History
- Opened: 6 December 2017

Services
Preceding station	Chengdu Metro	Following station
Dongguang towards Wangcong Temple	Line 6	Liusan Road towards Lanjiagou
Sanwayao Clockwise	Line 7	Sichuan Normal University Anticlockwise
Location

Liulichang (Chinese: 琉璃场) is a station on Line 6 and Line 7 of the Chengdu Metro in China. It was opened on 6 December 2017.

== Station layout ==
G	Entrances and Exits	Exits A-F
B1	Concourse	Faregates, Station Agent
B2	Clockwise	← Line 7 to Cuijiadian (Sanwayao)
B2	Island platform, doors open on the left
B2	Counterclockwise	Line 7 to Cuijiadian (Sichuan Normal University) →
B3	Northbound	← Line 6 to Wangcong Temple (Dongguang)
B3	Island platform, doors open on the left
B3	Southbound	Line 6 to Lanjiagou (Liusan Road) →

== Gallery ==
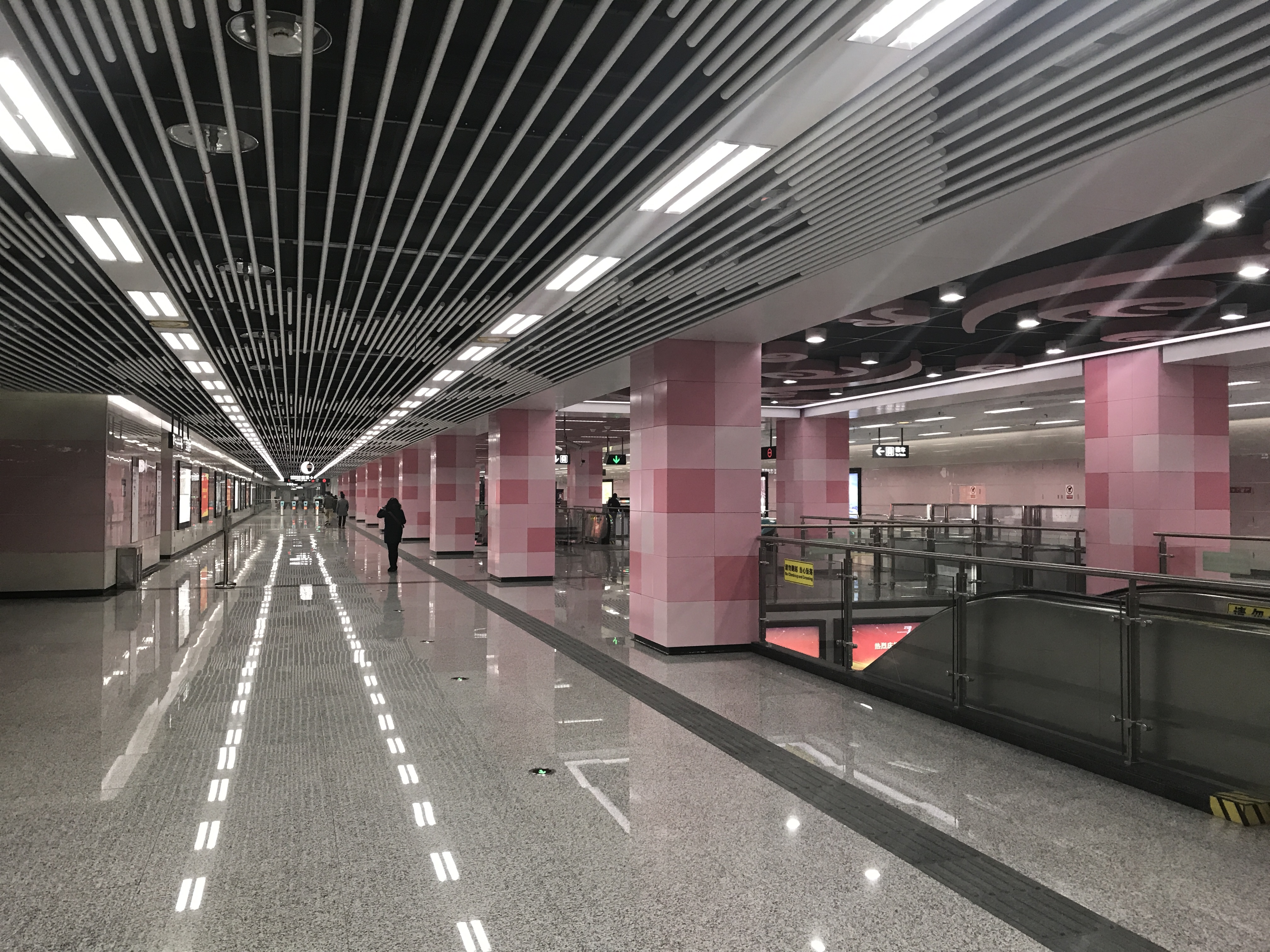
Concourse

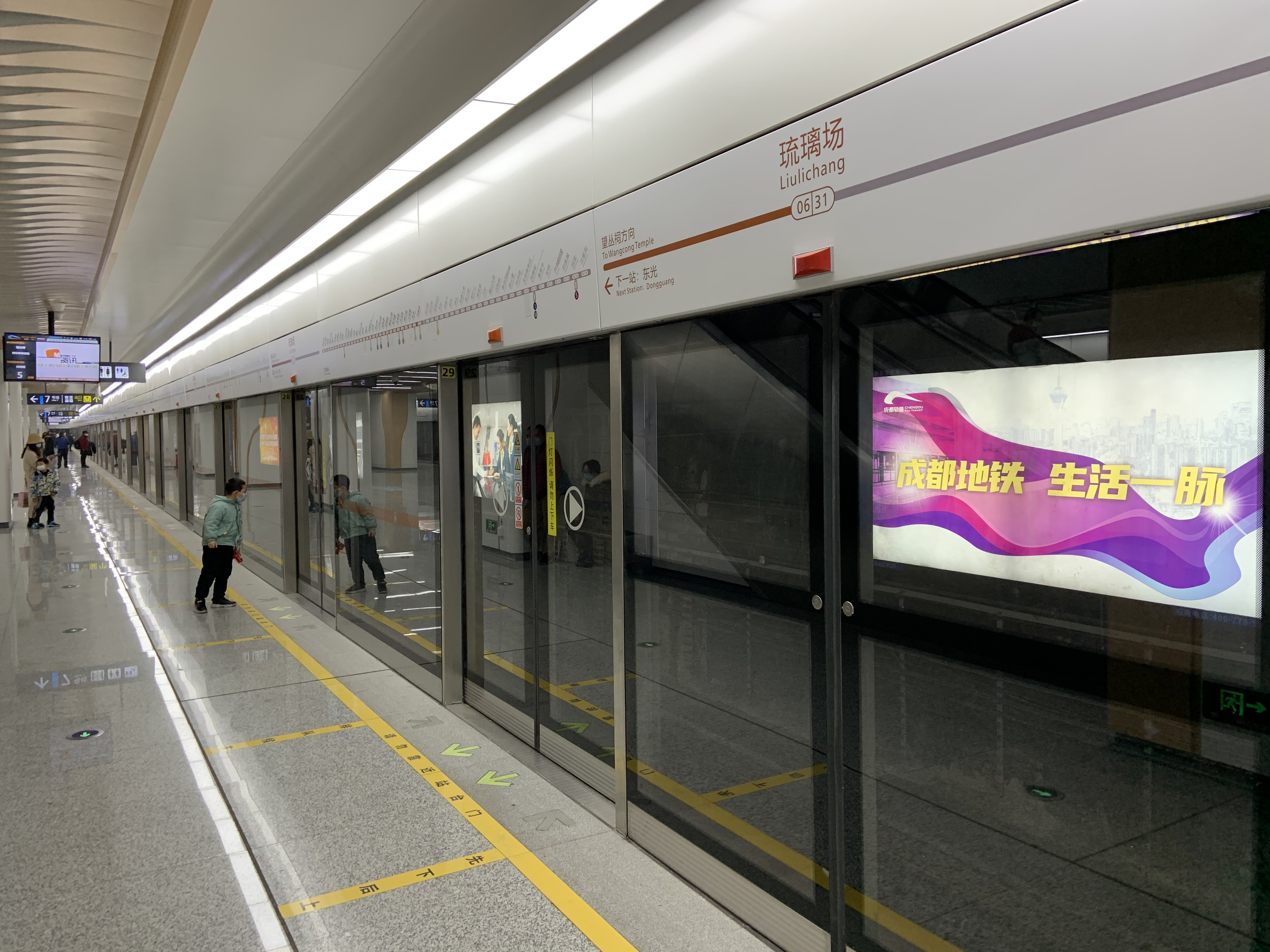
Line 6 platform

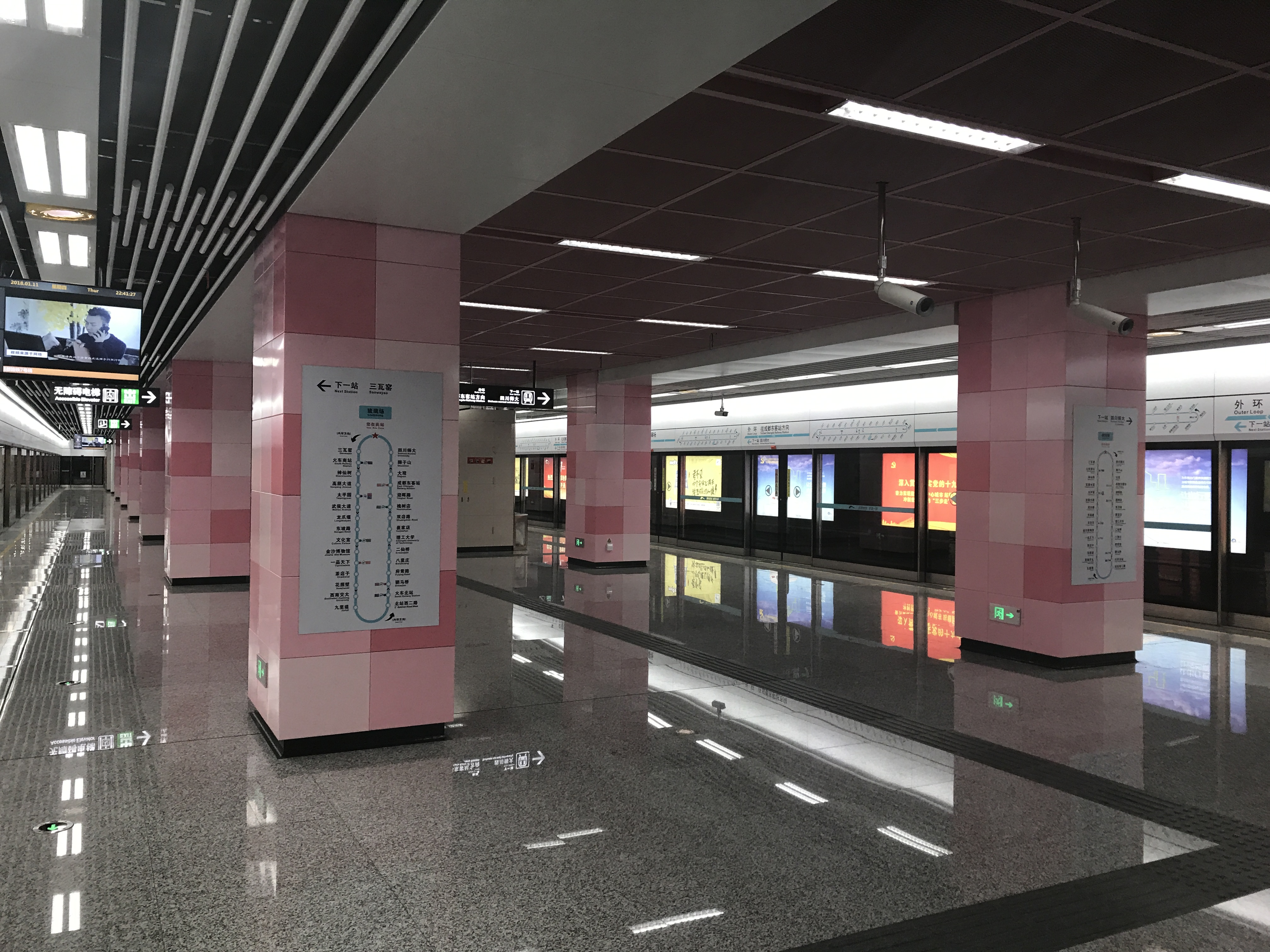
Line 7 platform
