= Zhujiang Road station =

Zhujiang Road Station (Chinese: 珠江路站) may refer to:

- Zhujiang Road station (Chengdu Metro)
- Zhujiang Road station (Guiyang Metro)
- Zhujiang Road station (Harbin Metro)
- Zhujiang Road station (Nanchang Metro)

== See also ==
- Zhujianglu station
