= Provincial Orthopaedics Hospital station =

Metro station in Chengdu, China

Provincial Orthopaedics Hospital 省骨科医院
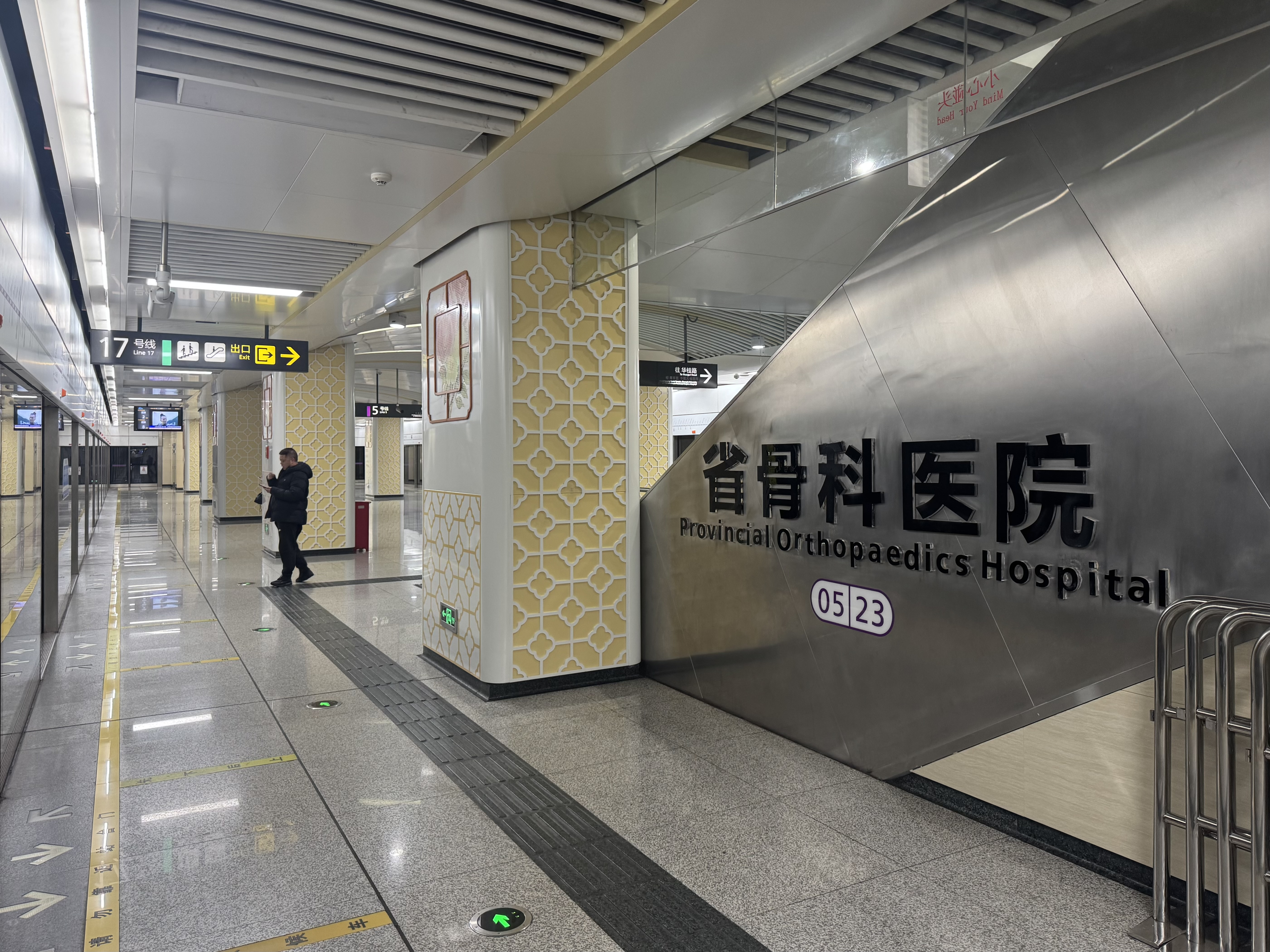
- Line 5 platform

General information
- Location: Qingyang District, Chengdu, Sichuan; China
- Operated by: Chengdu Metro Limited
- Lines: Line 5 Line 17
- Platforms: 4 (2 island platforms)

Other information
- Station code: 0523 1714

History
- Opened: 27 December 2019 (Line 5); 17 September 2025 (Line 17)

Services
| Preceding station | Chengdu Metro | Following station |
|---|---|---|
| Qingyang Taoist Temple towards Huagui Road | Line 5 | Gaoshengqiao towards Huilong |
| Huanhua Lane towards Jiujiang North | Line 17 | Xiaonan Street towards Gaohong |
Location

Provincial Orthopaedics Hospital (Chinese: 省骨科医院) is a station on Line 5 and Line 17 of the Chengdu Metro in China. It was opened on 27 December 2019 for Line 5, and 17 September 2025 for Line 17.

== Gallery ==
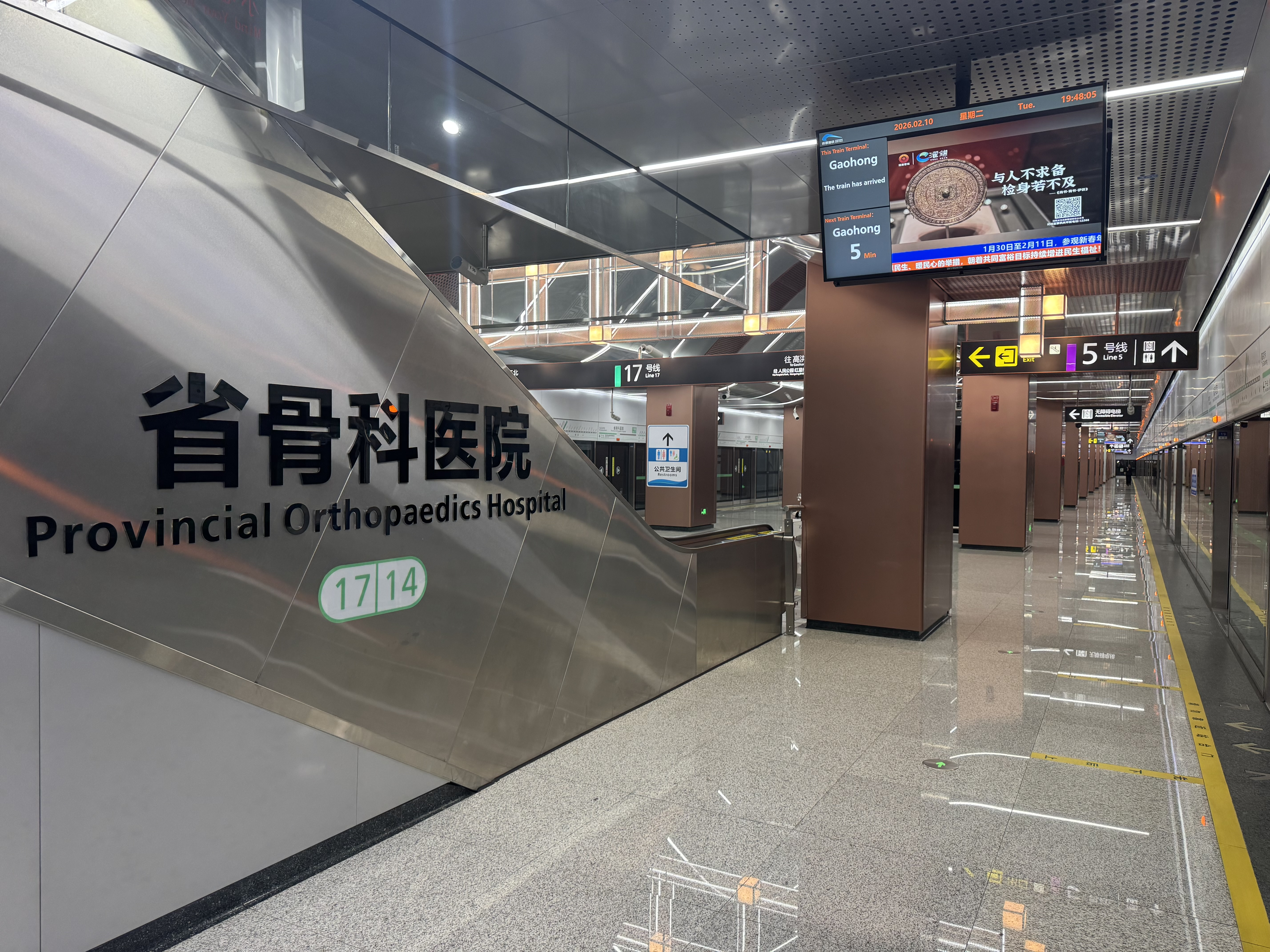
Line 17 platform
