= Sanwayao station =

Chengdu Metro station

Sanwayao 三瓦窑
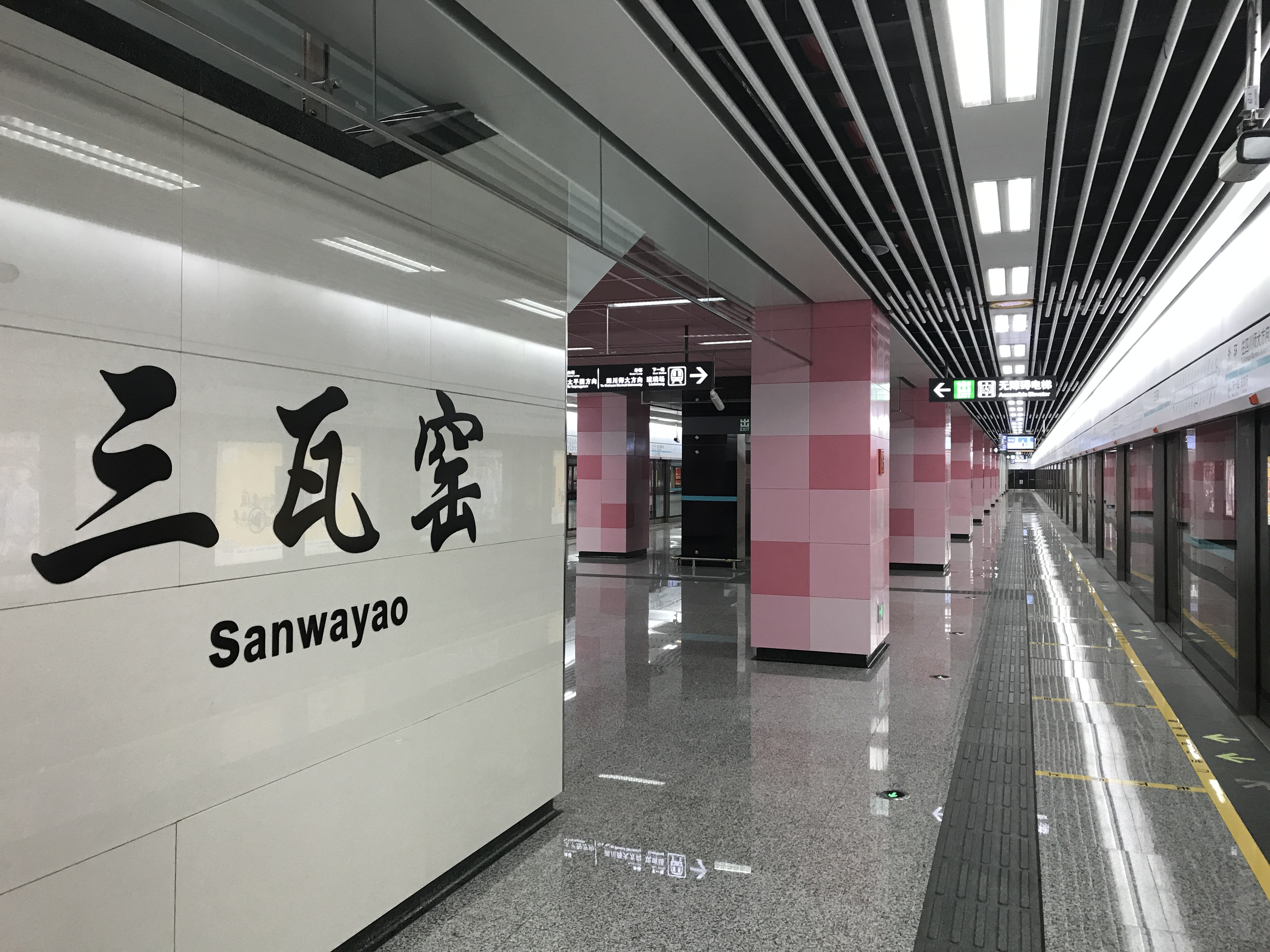

General information
- Location: Wuhou District, Chengdu, Sichuan; China
- Coordinates: 30°36′22″N 104°5′1″E
- Operator: Chengdu Metro Limited
- Line: Line 7
- Platforms: 2 (1 island platform)

Other information
- Station code: 0717

History
- Opened: 6 December 2017

Services
Preceding station	Chengdu Metro	Following station
South Railway Station Clockwise	Line 7	Liulichang Anticlockwise
Location

Sanwayao (Chinese: 三瓦窑) is a station on Line 7 of the Chengdu Metro in China. It was opened on 6 December 2017.

== Station layout ==
G	Entrances and Exits	Exits A-C
B1	Concourse	Faregates, Station Agent
B2	Clockwise	← Line 7 to Cuijiadian (South Railway Station)
B2	Island platform, doors open on the left
B2	Counterclockwise	Line 7 to Cuijiadian (Liulichang) →

== Gallery ==
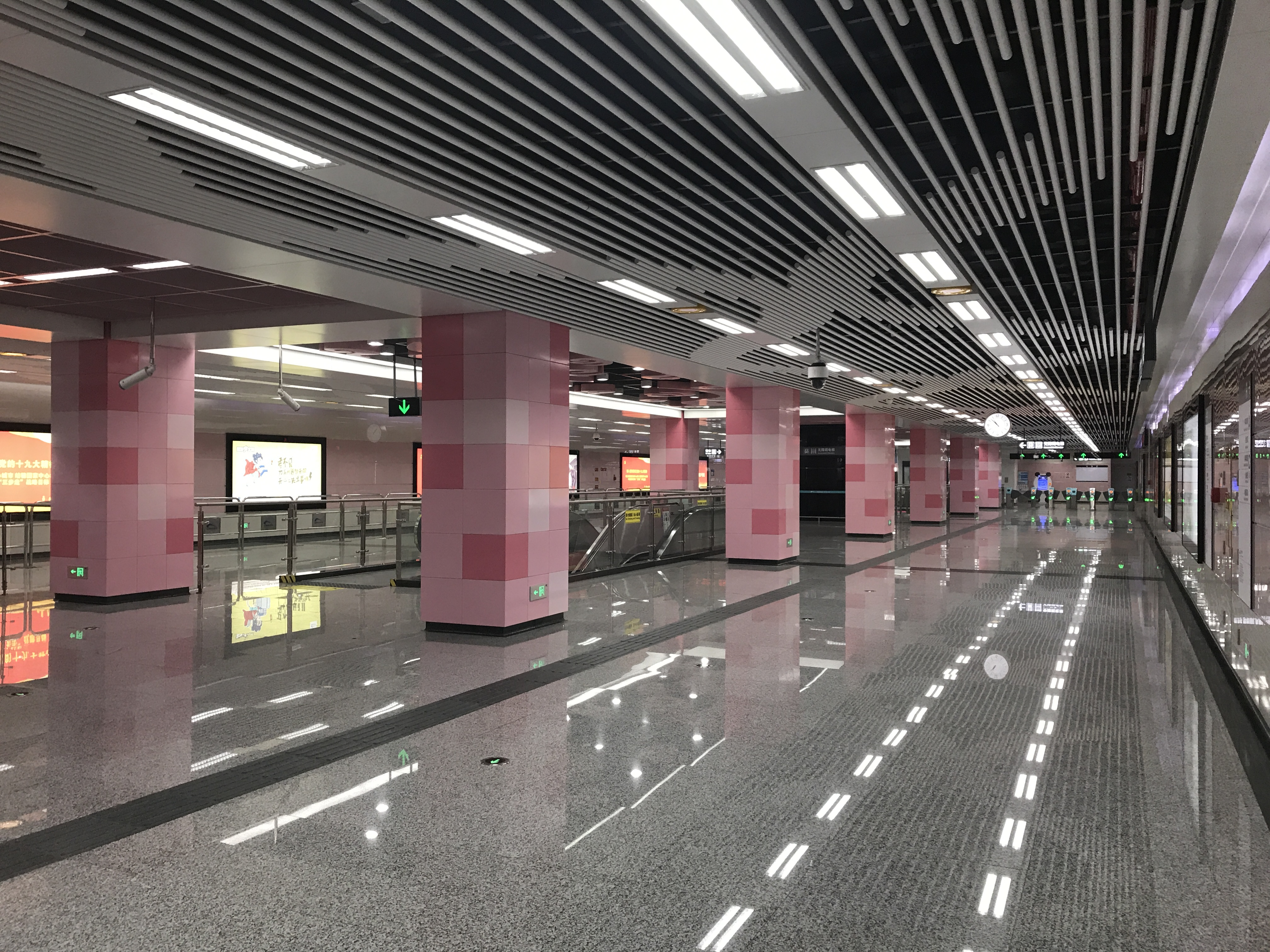
Concourse

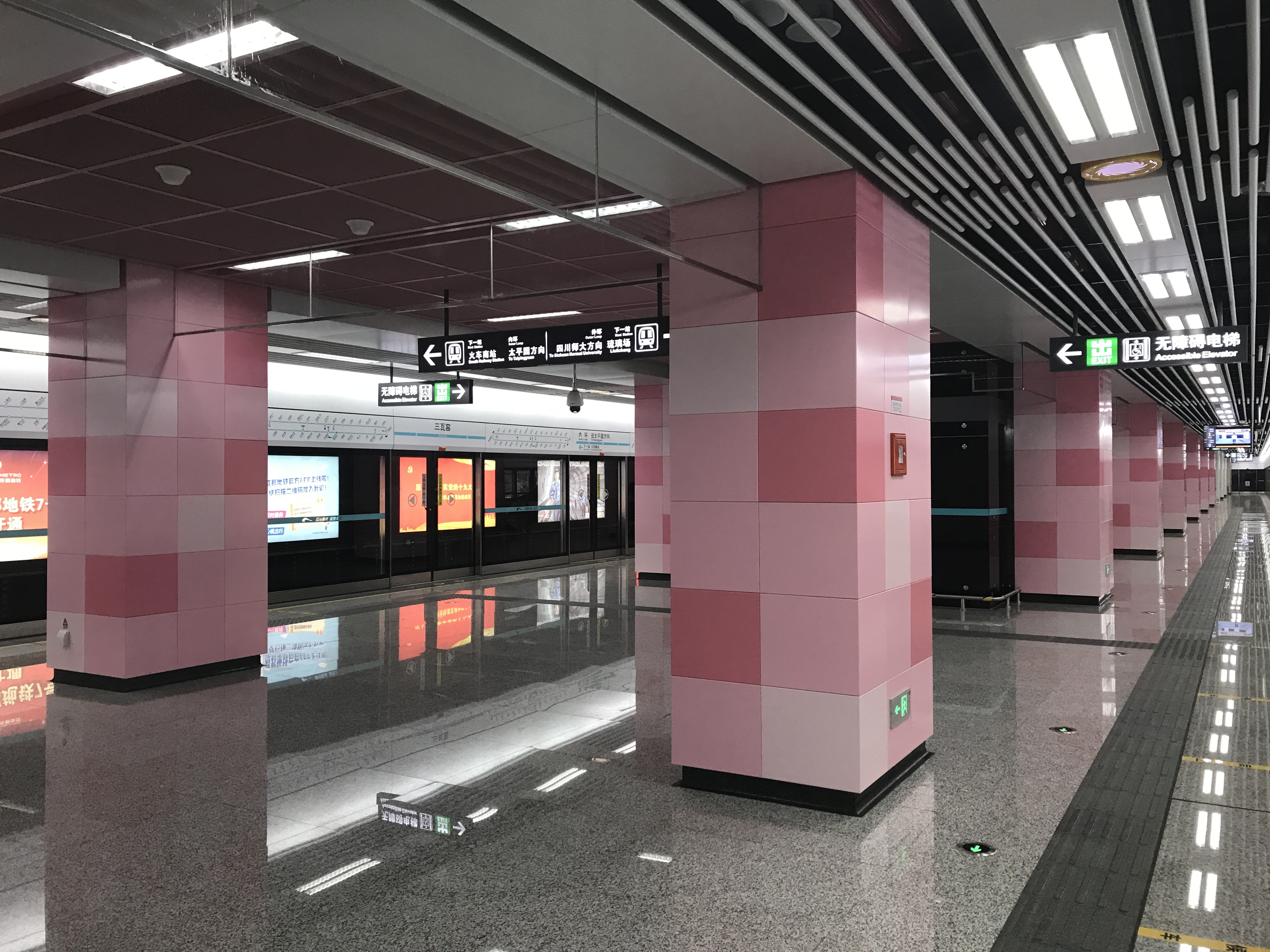
Platform
