= Daguan station (Chengdu Metro) =

Chengdu Metro station

Daguan 大观
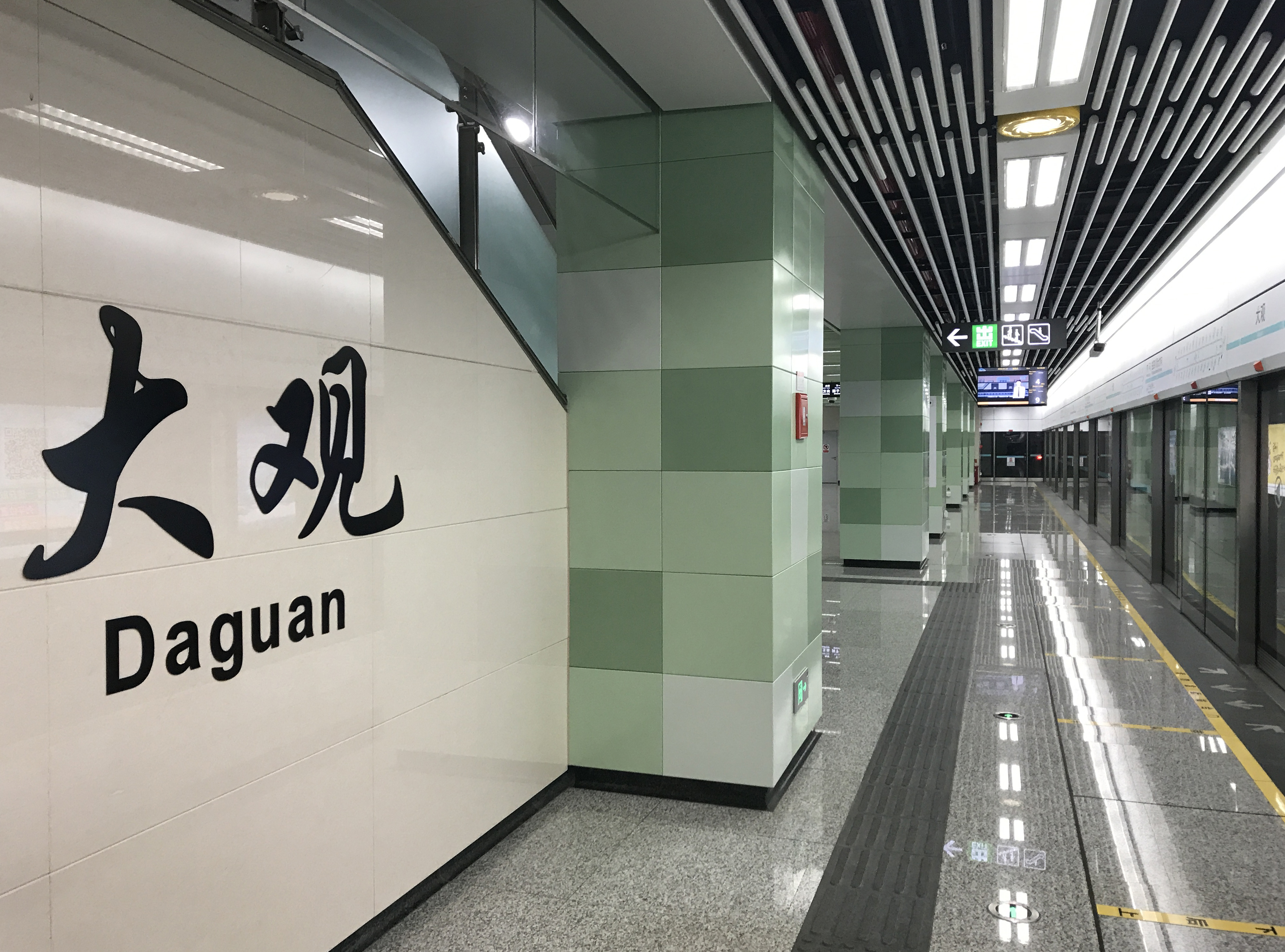

General information
- Location: Chenghua District, Chengdu, Sichuan; China
- Coordinates: 30.62387°N 104.13017°E
- Operator: Chengdu Metro Limited
- Line: Line 7
- Platforms: 2 (1 island platform)

Other information
- Station code: 0721

History
- Opened: 6 December 2017

Services
| Preceding station | Chengdu Metro | Following station |
|---|---|---|
| Shizishan Clockwise | Line 7 | Chengdu East Railway Station Anticlockwise |
Location

Daguan (Chinese: 大观) is a station on Line 7 of the Chengdu Metro in China. It was opened on 6 December 2017.

== Station layout ==
| G | Entrances and Exits | Exits A-D |
| B1 | Concourse | Faregates, Station Agent |
| B2 | Clockwise | ← Line 7 to Cuijiadian (Shizishan) |
| B2 | Island platform, doors open on the left |
| B2 | Counterclockwise | Line 7 to Cuijiadian (Chengdu East Railway Station) → |

== Gallery ==
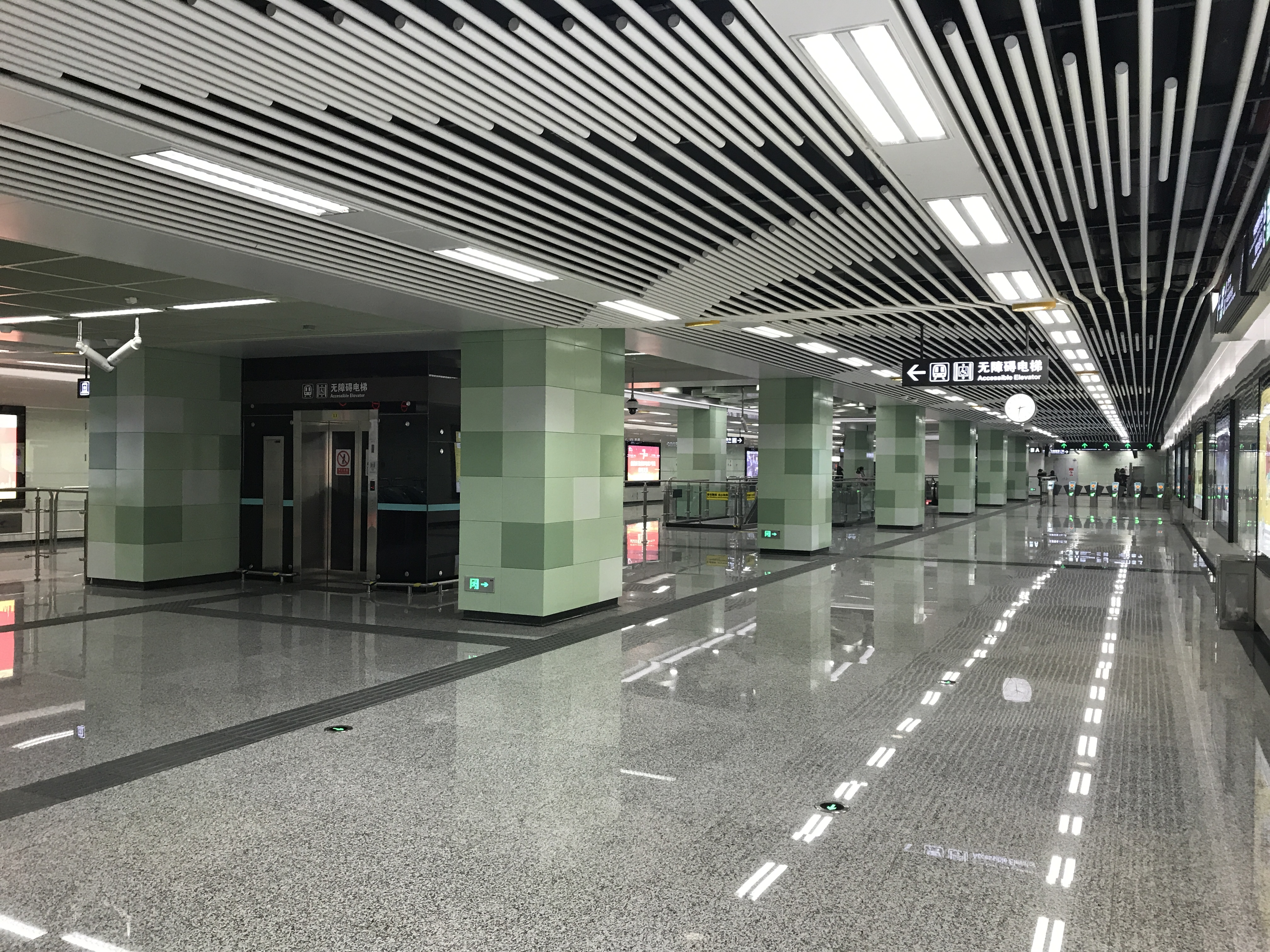
Concourse

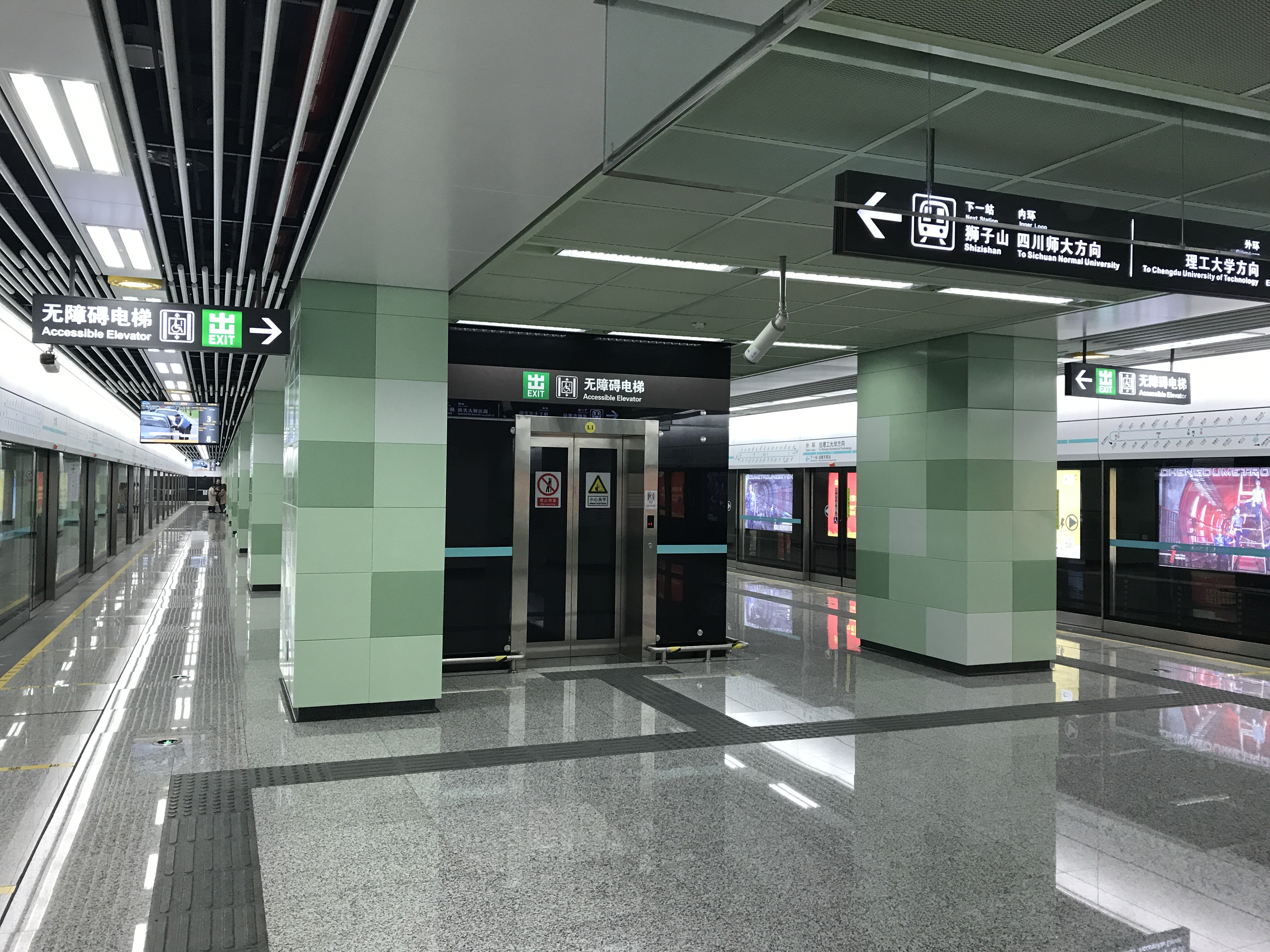
Platform
