= Shizishan station (Chengdu Metro) =

Metro station in Chengdu, China

Shizishan 狮子山
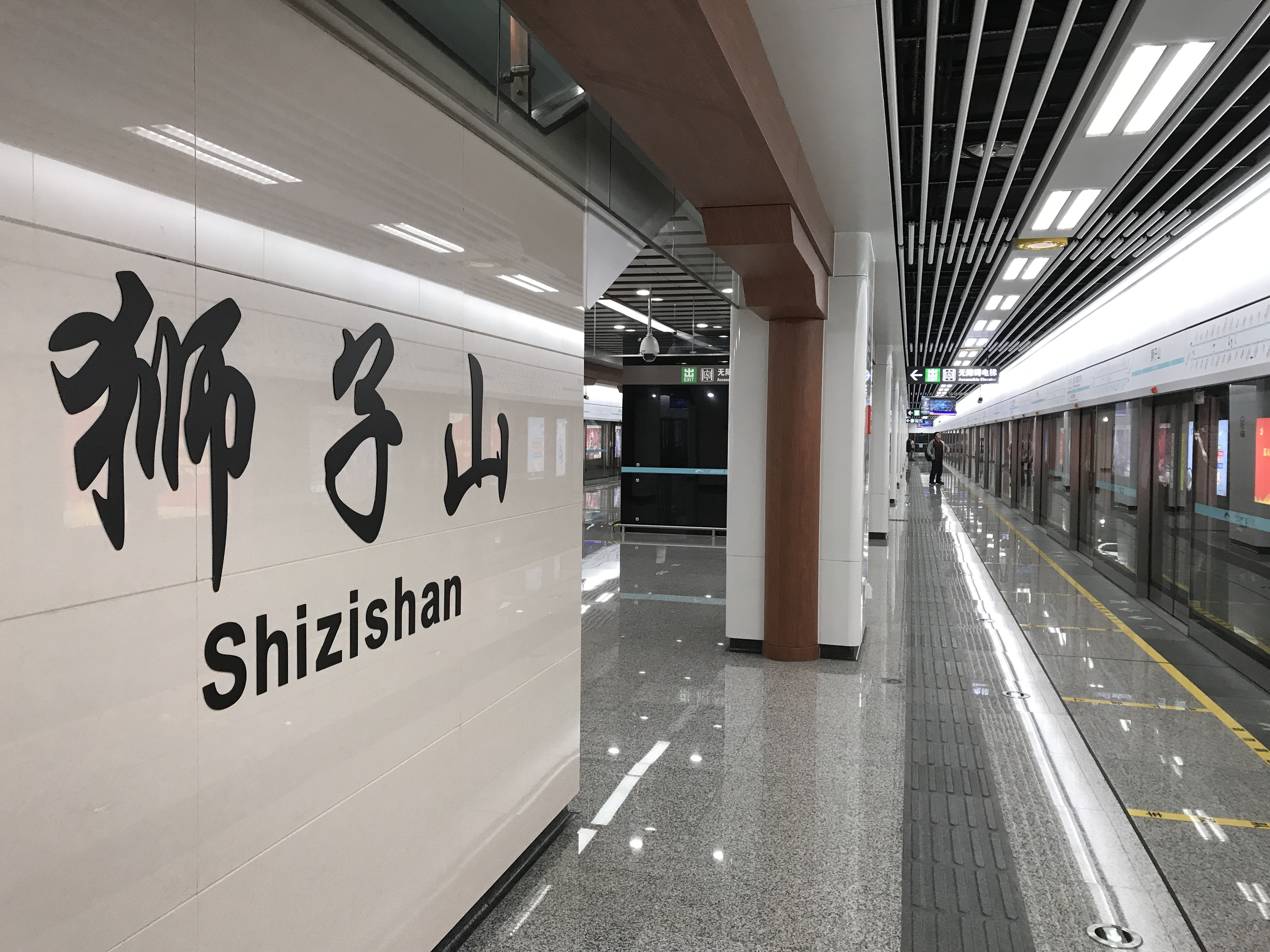

General information
- Location: Jinjiang District, Chengdu, Sichuan; China
- Operator: Chengdu Metro Limited
- Line: Line 7
- Platforms: 2 (1 island platform)

Other information
- Station code: 0720

History
- Opened: 6 December 2017

Services
Preceding station	Chengdu Metro	Following station
Sichuan Normal University Clockwise	Line 7	Daguan Anticlockwise
Location

Shizishan station (Chinese: 狮子山站; pinyin: Shīzǐshān zhàn) is a station on Line 7 of the Chengdu Metro in China. It was opened on 6 December 2017.

== Station layout ==
G	Entrances and Exits	Exits A-D
B1	Concourse	Faregates, Station Agent
B2	Clockwise	← Line 7 to Cuijiadian (Sichuan Normal University)
B2	Island platform, doors open on the left
B2	Counterclockwise	Line 7 to Cuijiadian (Daguan) →

== Gallery ==
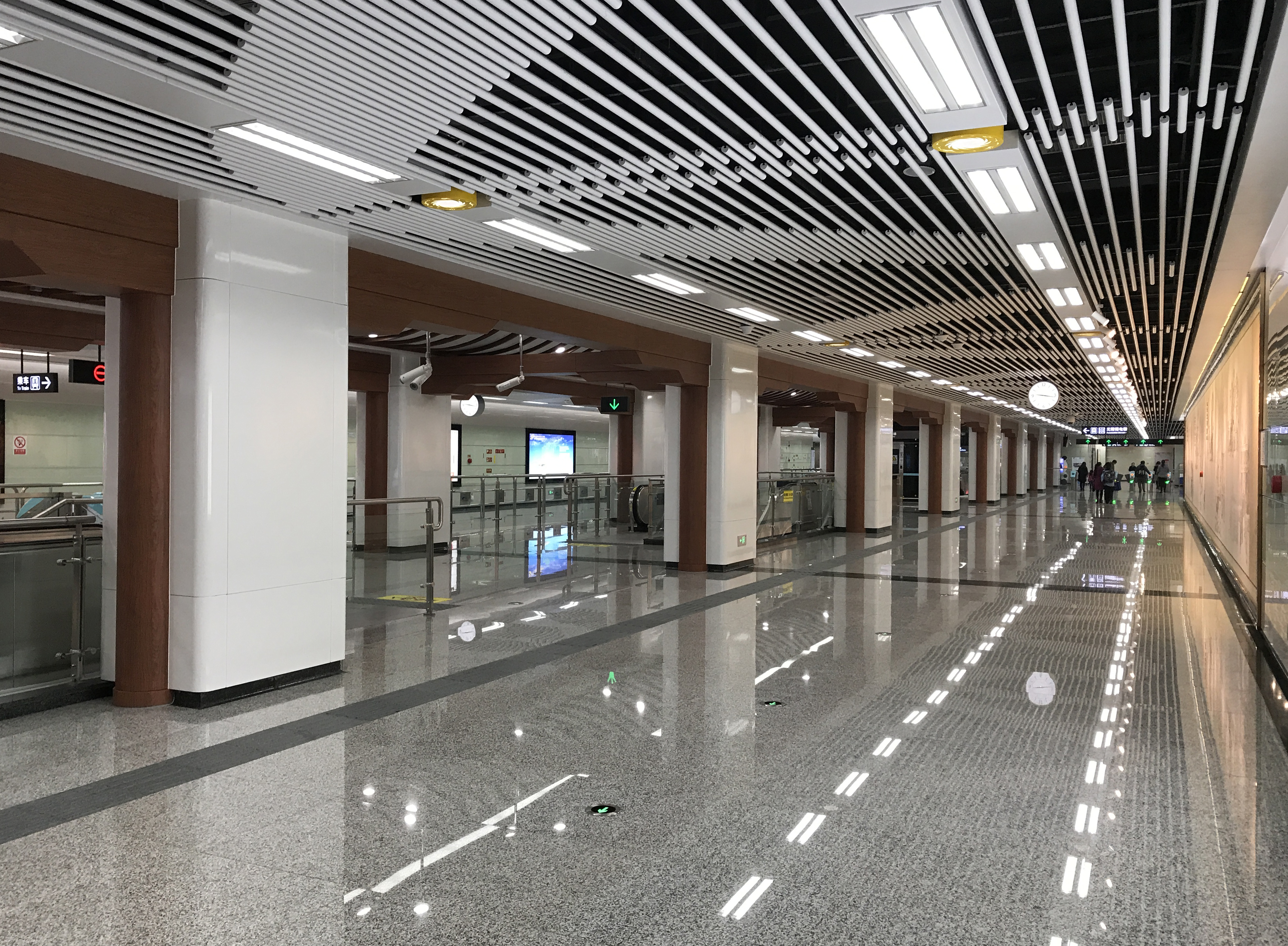
Concourse

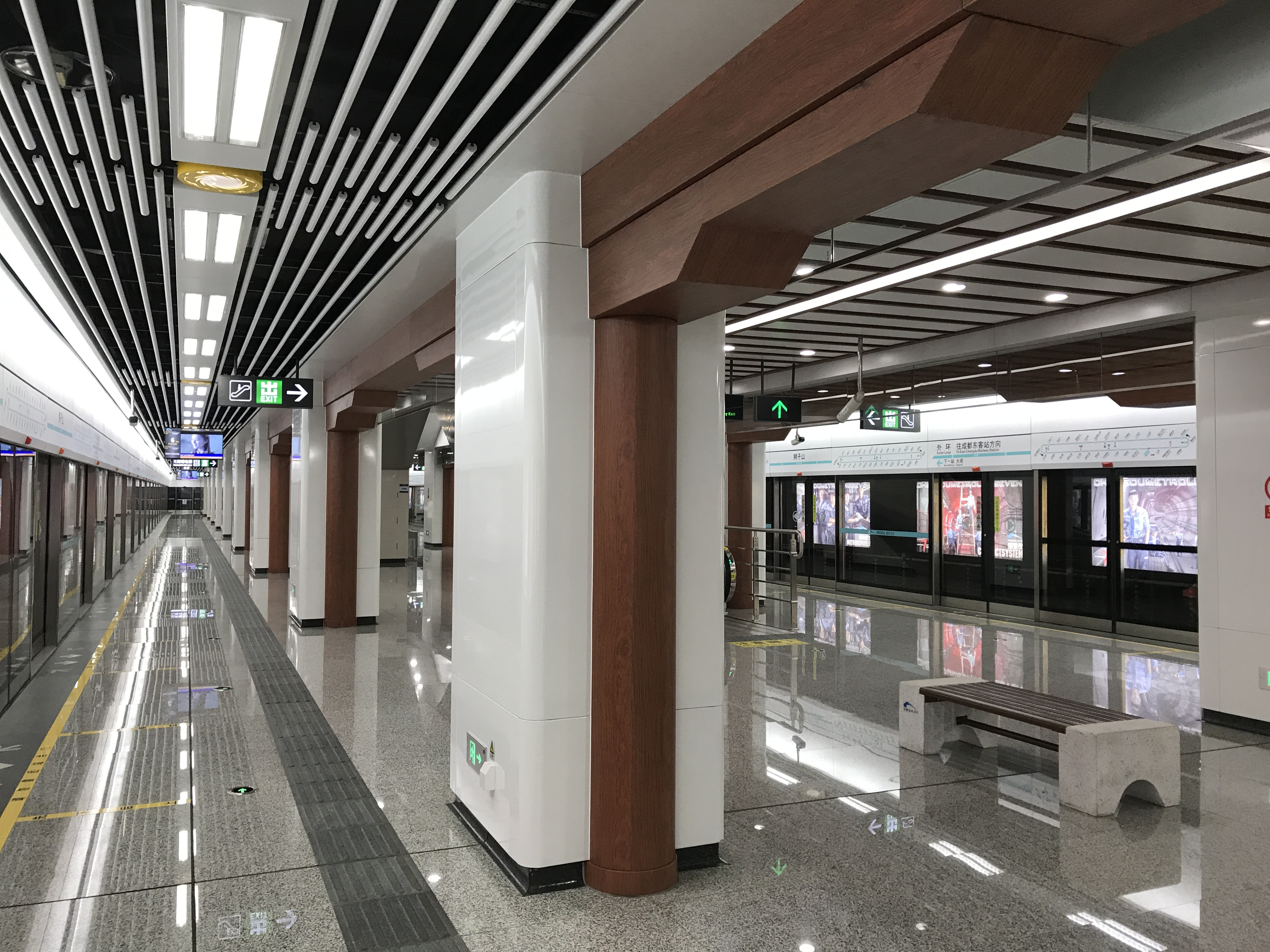
Platform
