= East of Terminal 2 of Shuangliu International Airport station =

Metro station in Chengdu, China

East of Terminal 2 of Shuangliu International Airport 双流机场2航站楼东
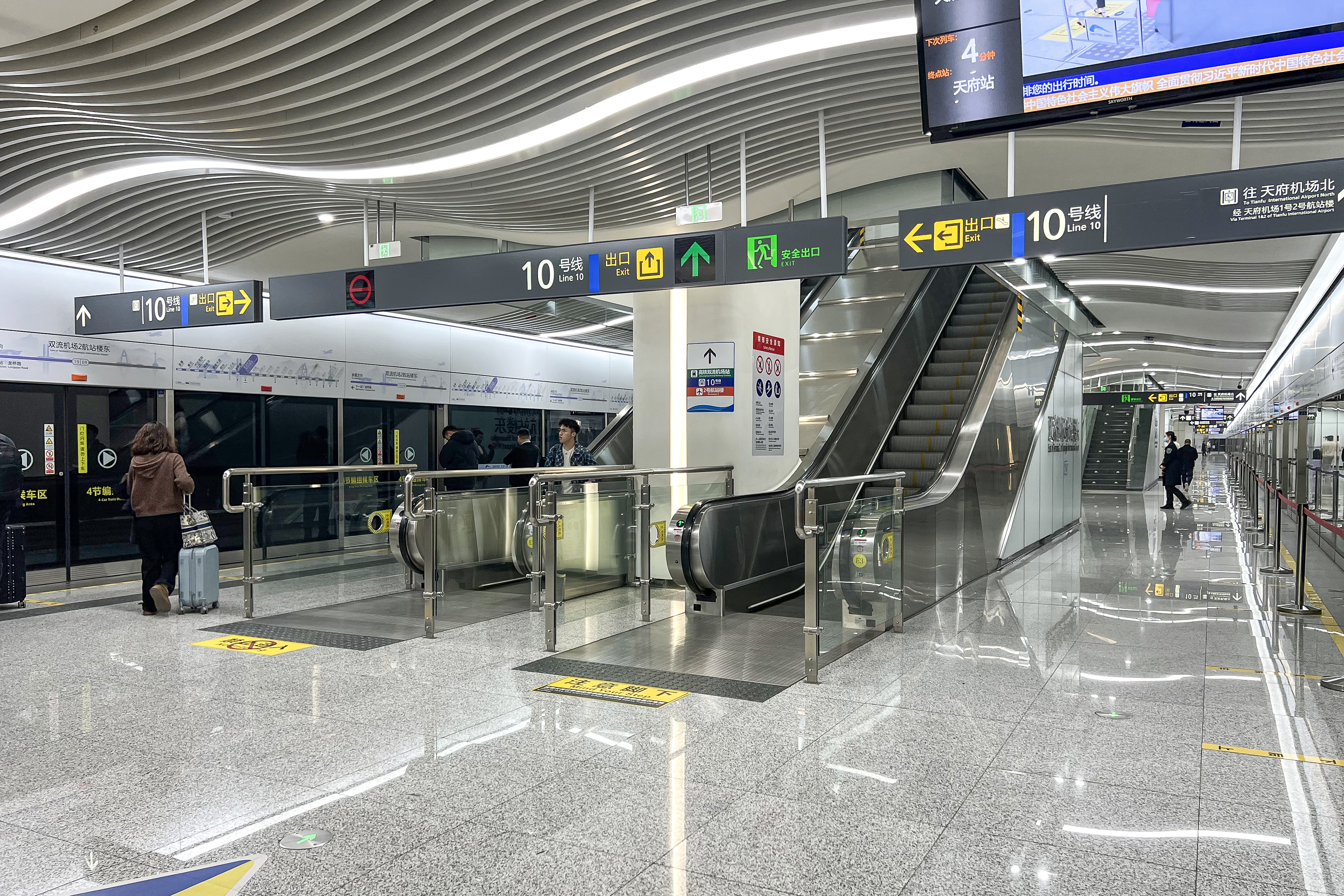
- Platform of Line 19

Chinese name
- Simplified Chinese: 双流机场2航站楼东站
- Traditional Chinese: 雙流機場2航站樓東站
Transcriptions
Standard Mandarin
- Hanyu Pinyin: Shuāngliújīchǎng Érhángzhànlóu Dōng Zhàn

General information
- Location: Parking in Terminal 2 of Chengdu Shuangliu International Airport; Shuangliu District, Chengdu, Sichuan; China
- Coordinates: 30°34′18″N 103°57′21″E
- System: Chengdu Metro
- Operator: Chengdu Metro Limited
- Lines: Line 19; Line 30
- Platforms: 4 (1 island platform and 2 side platforms)
- Tracks: 4
- Connections: 10 Terminal 2 of Shuangliu International Airport; Chengdu Shuangliu International Airport; Shuangliu Airport

Construction
- Structure type: Underground
- Platform levels: 2
- Accessible: Yes

Other information
- Station code: 1909 3024

History
- Opened: 28 November 2023 (Line 19); 16 December 2025 (Line 30)
- Former names: Terminal 2 of Shuangliu International Airport

Services
Preceding station	Chengdu Metro	Following station
Longqiao Road towards Jinxing	Line 19	Longgang towards Tianfu Station
Terminus	Line 19 Direct	Terminal 1 & 2 of Tianfu International Airport towards Terminal 1 & 2 of Tianfu International Airport via Tianfu Station
Sisheng towards Longquanyi Railway Station South	Line 30	Terminus
Route map
B3 (Line 19)
B2 (Line 30)
Location

East of Terminal 2 of Shuangliu International Airport (Chinese: 双流机场2航站楼东) is a metro station on Line 19 and Line 30 of Chengdu Metro at Chengdu, Sichuan, China. It was opened on 28 November 2020 for Line 19 and 16 December 2025 for Line 30.

== History ==
In the initial plan, the station was a part of Terminal 2 of Shuangliu International Airport station. Lines 10, 19, and 30 can be interchange within the station. However, because the China Railway Shuangliu Airport railway station lies between the Line 10 station and the Line 19/30 station, and the China Railway Chengdu Group did not permit the construction of transfer passage in the area on its station, the Line 19/30 station was separated and became the East of Terminal 2 of Shuangliu International Airport station now. As a result, only virtual transfer is provided between Lines 19/30 and Line 10.

== Structure ==
East of Terminal 2 of Shuangliu International Airport has three floors: basement 1 is the concourse, basement 2 is the Line 30 platforms, and basement 3 is the Line 19 platform. Line 19 is consist with an island platform and Line 30 are two side platforms. The platform of Line 19 is completely perpendicular to the western platform of Line 30. Passengers transferring from Line 19 to Line 30 can move directly between two platforms, but those transferring from Line 30 to Line 19 need to detour via the concourse.

Plus, two sidings are exist on the north side of Line 19's platform, which can be used for derict train to reverse direction. Crossovers are also installed at both side of Line 30's platform.

=== Entrances/exits ===
There are four entrances with code in use. In addition, an elevator exit without code is located between exits C and D. On the west side of concourse, an underground passageway extends from here to China Railway Shuangliu Airport railway station. After passing through the CR station, passengers can also reach the East of Terminal 2 of Shuangliu International Airport station on Line 10, as well as the Terminal 2 of Shuangliu Airport.

- A: 2nd Jichang Road South (机场南二路), 2nd Jichang Road East
- B: 2nd Jichang Road South, 2nd Jichang Road East
- C: 3rd Jichang Road East
- D: 1st Jichang Road East
- (Elevator exit without code)

== Gallery ==
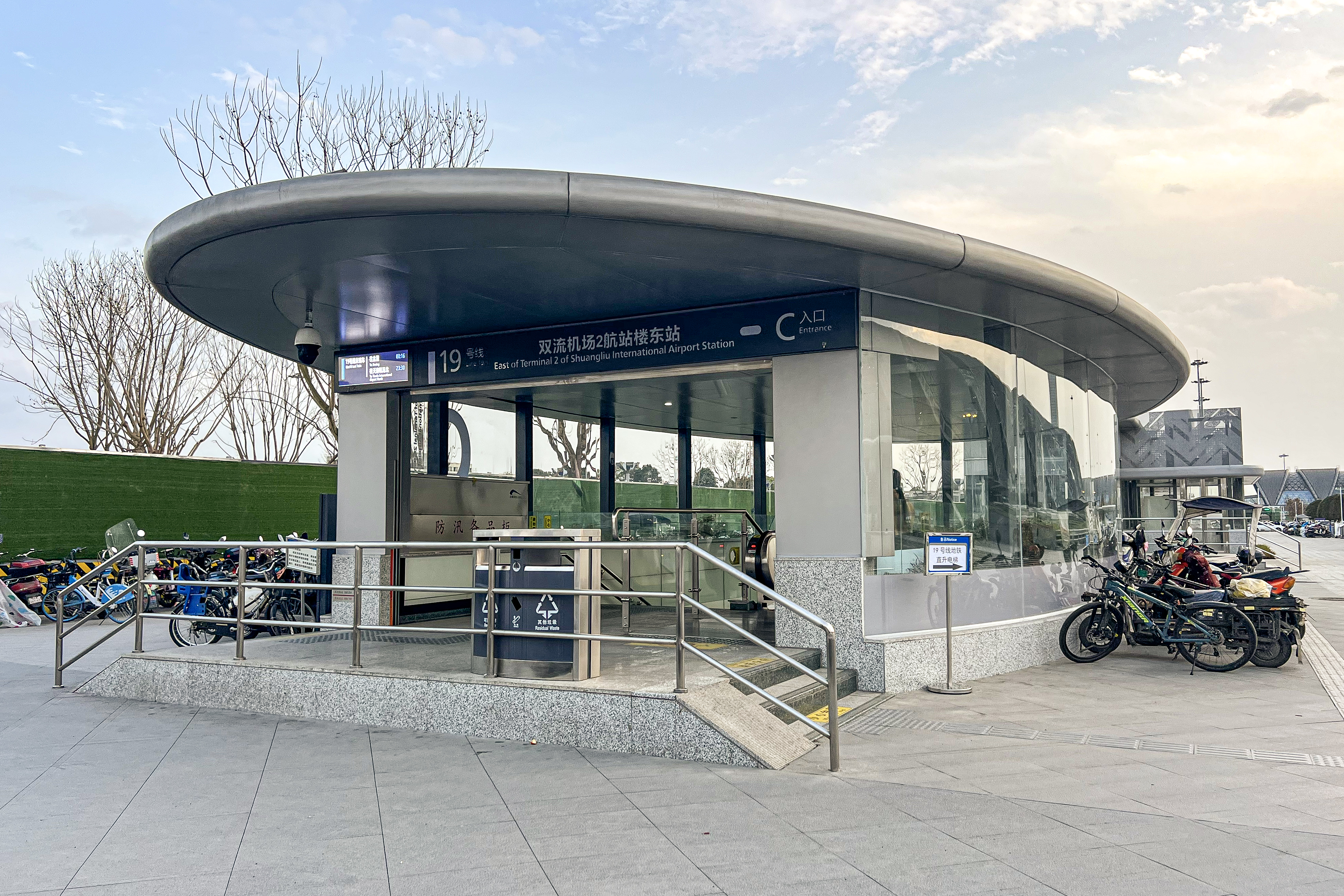
Entrance C (before Line 30 opened)

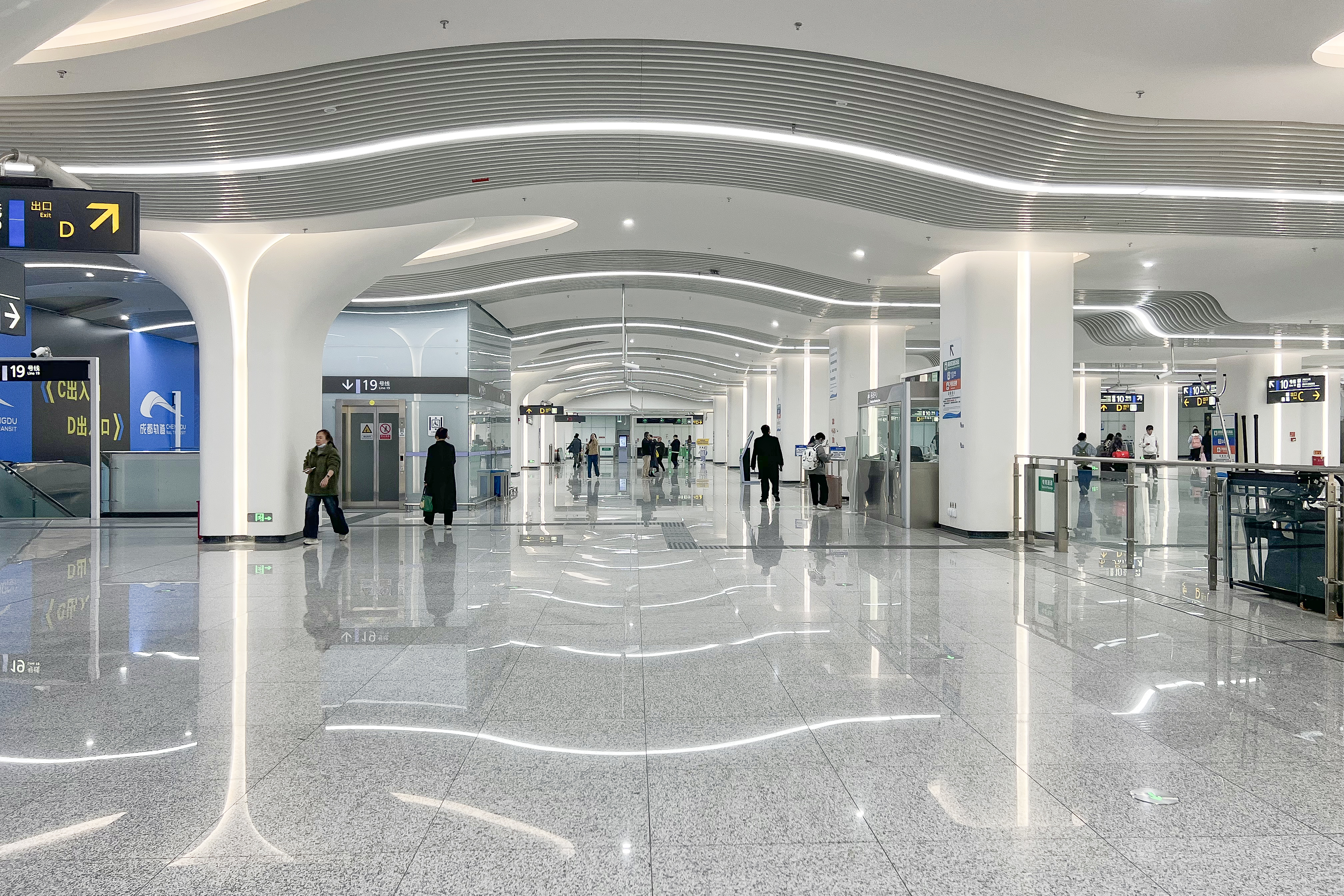
Concourse (before Line 30 opened)

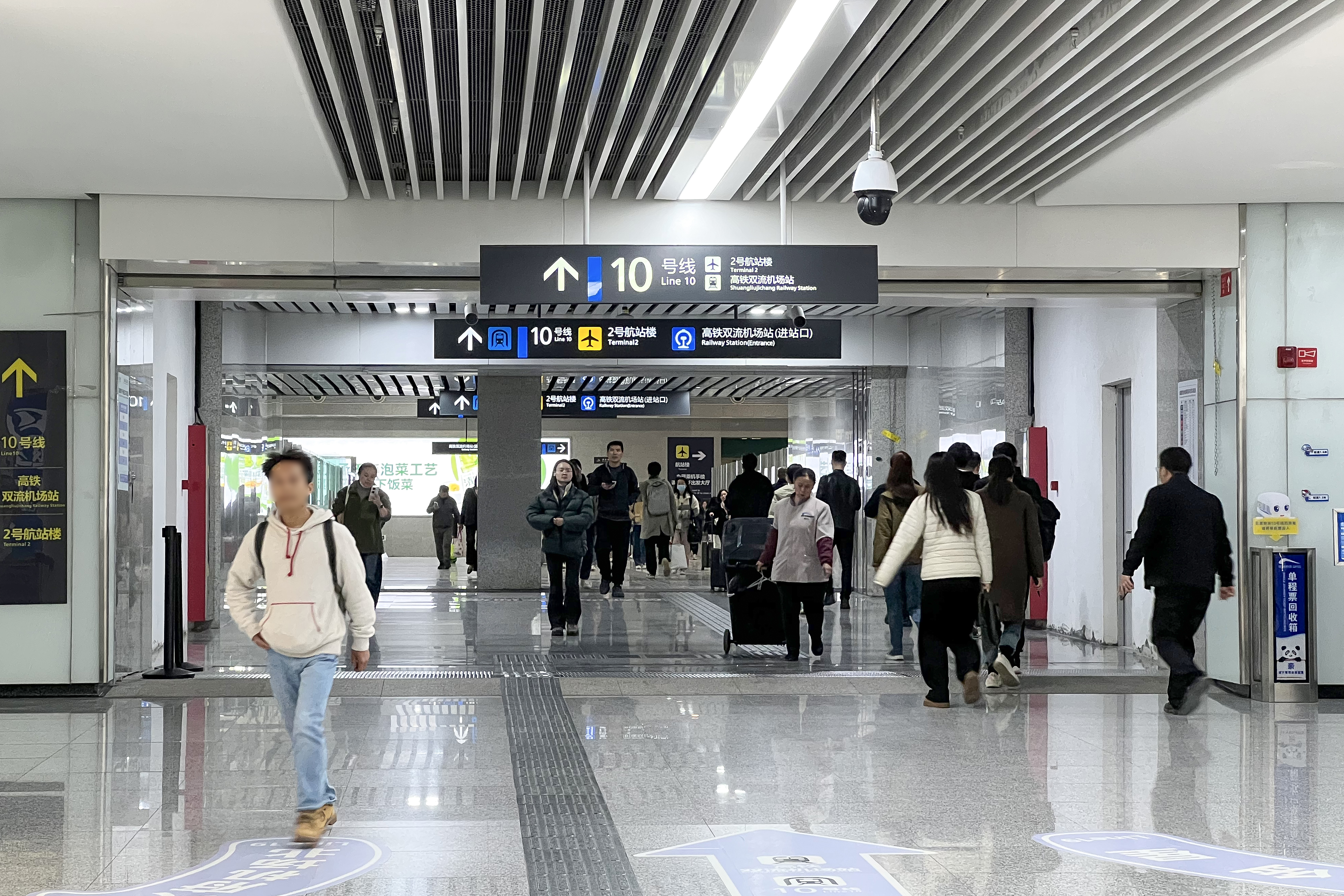
Passageway for Shuangliu Airport railway station
