= Line 30 (Chengdu Metro) =

Metro line in Chengdu, China

Chengdu Metro Line 30

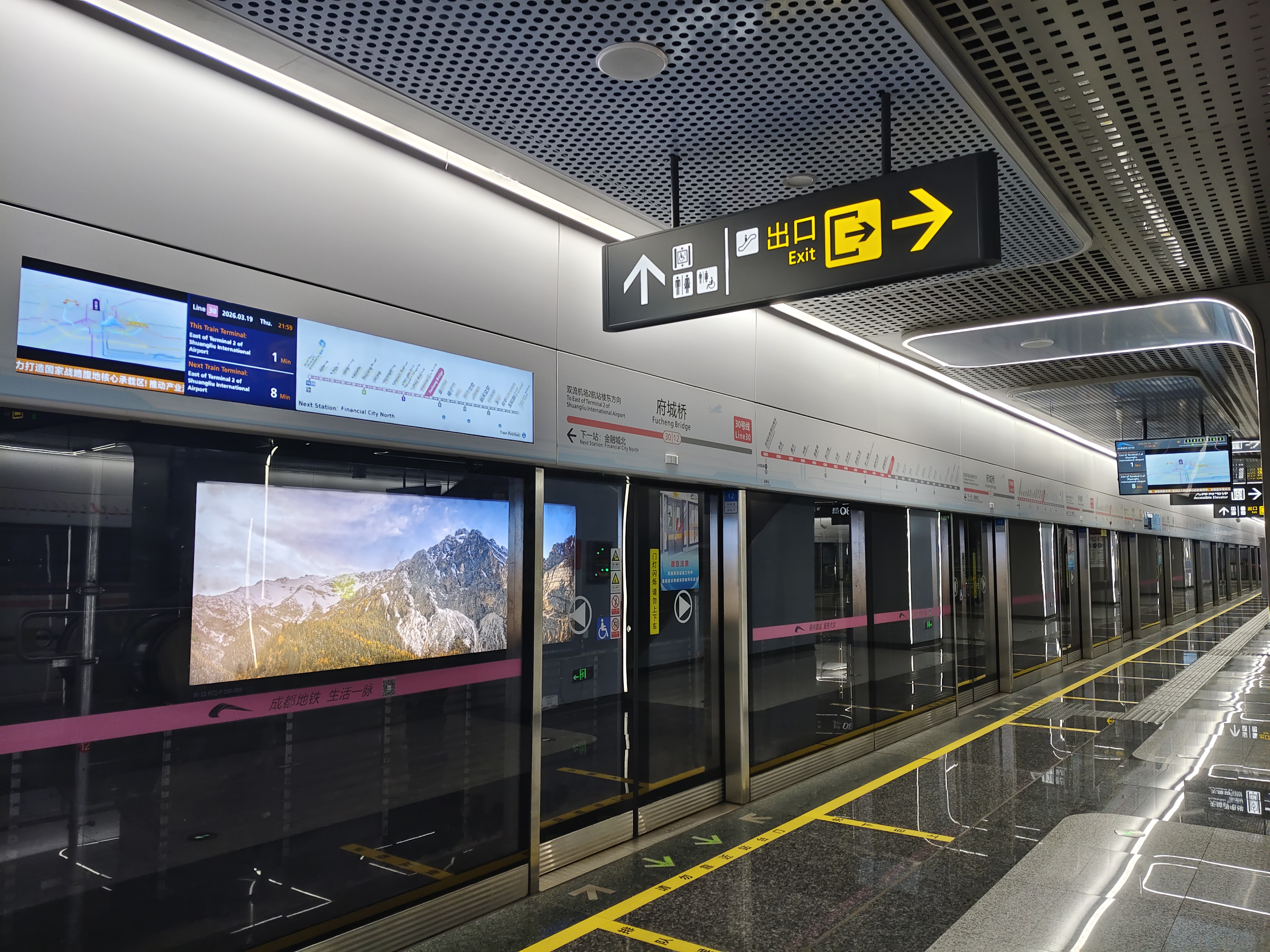
- Platform of Fucheng Bridge station, towards East of Terminal 2 of Shuangliu International Airport

Overview
- Status: Operational
- Owner: City of Chengdu
- Locale: Chengdu, Sichuan
- Termini: East of Terminal 2 of Shuangliu International Airport; Longquanyi Railway Station South
- Stations: 24(22 in operation)

Service
- Type: Rapid transit
- System: Chengdu Metro
- Operator: Chengdu Metro
- Depot(s): Gaobeiba Depot (高碑坝车辆段); Hongjiaqiao Depot (洪家桥停车场)

History
- Opened: 16 December 2025

Technical
- Line length: 27.96 km (17.4 mi)
- Num of tracks: 2
- Character: Underground
- Track gauge: 1,435 mm (4 ft 8 1/2 in)
- Electrification: Overhead lines, 1,500 V DC
- Operating speed: 80 km/h (50 mph)

Line 30 of the Chengdu Metro is a metro line currently in operation in Chengdu. Line 30's color is Light Pink. Phase 1 runs tangentially on the Southern Chengdu from East of Terminal 2 of Shuangliu International Airport to Longquanyi Railway Station South, totalling 27.96 km and 24 stations, of which 22 are currently in operation, all underground. Line 30 uses 6-car Type-B rolling stock operating up to 80 km/h. and is served by two depots at Gaobeiba and Hongjiaqiao.

== History ==
- On August 21, 2019, Line 30 is approved officially as part of the fourth phase expansion for the Chengdu Metro by the National Development and Reform Commission, confirming it for 2019–2024's subway construction plan.
- On March 18, 2020, construction started on Line 8 Phase 2, Line 19 Phase 2, Line 27 Phase 1, and Line 30 Phase 1.
- On July 17, 2020, Construction officially started for the 4 stations on Line 30 in Longquanyi District.
- In Dec 2022, Phase 1 finished Financial City North's water/cable/pipe reroute, marking station's main structure construction enters next stage.
- On Dec 22 2022, Phase 1 finished Jiaozi Flyover's structure construction.
- On 17 Feb 2023, Phase 1 East of Terminal 2 of Shuangliu International Airport～Sisheng section's left tunnel is finished, marking the completion of the 18th tunnel.
- On 31 March 2023, Gaobeiba Depot (高碑坝车辆段) is powered on.
- On 11 September 2023, Phase 1's longest station - East of Terminal 2 of Shuangliu International Airport finished structure construction, marking the 23rd station to finish structure contraction.
- On 22 September 2023, Phase 1 finished tunnel construction.
- On 16 December 2025, Phase 1 entered service.

== Stations ==
- OSI: Out-of-Station Interchange

Station number	Station name		Transfer	Distance km		Location
Station number	English	Chinese	Transfer	Distance km		Location
3024	East of Terminal 2 of Shuangliu International Airport	双流机场2航站楼东	19; 10 (OSI via Terminal 2 of Shuangliu International Airport); IPW; CTU	0.00	0.00	Shuangliu
3023	Sisheng	寺圣		2.09	2.09	Shuangliu
3022	Xingyue	星月		0.81	2.90	Shuangliu
3021	Guangming	光明		0.92	3.82	Shuangliu
3020	Xiejiadu	谢家渡		1.31	4.13	Shuangliu
3019	Zhujiang Road	珠江路	8	0.66	5.79	Shuangliu
3018	Datong	大同		1.34	7.13	Shuangliu
3017	Shiyangdong	石羊东		1.99	9.12	High-Tech Zone
3016	Xinyuan Avenue	新园大道		0.87	9.99	High-Tech Zone
3015	Chengdu First People's Hospital	市一医院	5	1.15	11.14	High-Tech Zone
3014	Yizhou Avenue	益州大道		0.84	11.98	High-Tech Zone
3013	Financial City North	金融城北		0.86	12.84	High-Tech Zone
3012	Fucheng Bridge	府城桥		0.61	13.44	High-Tech Zone
3011	Jinshi Road	金石路	6	1.25	14.69	Jinjiang
3010	Juanzishu	棬子树		1.59	16.28	Jinjiang
3009	Jinyi	锦逸		0.99	17.27	Jinjiang
3008	Jiaozi Flyover	娇子立交	13	1.70	18.97	Jinjiang
3007	Haitong Street	海桐街		0.90	19.87	Jinjiang
3006	Hangtian Flyover	航天立交		1.01	20.87	Jinjiang
3005	Huiwangling	惠王陵	2	1.07	21.94	Longquanyi
3004	Yushi	玉石		1.37	23.31	Longquanyi
3003	Fenshui	分水		1.09	24.40	Longquanyi
3002	Yuhong Road	玉虹路				Longquanyi
3001	Longquanyi Railway Station South	龙泉驿火车站南	2 (OSI via Longquanyi Railway Station); CEE			Longquanyi
