= Nijiaqiao station =

Metro station in Chengdu, China

Nijiaqiao 倪家桥
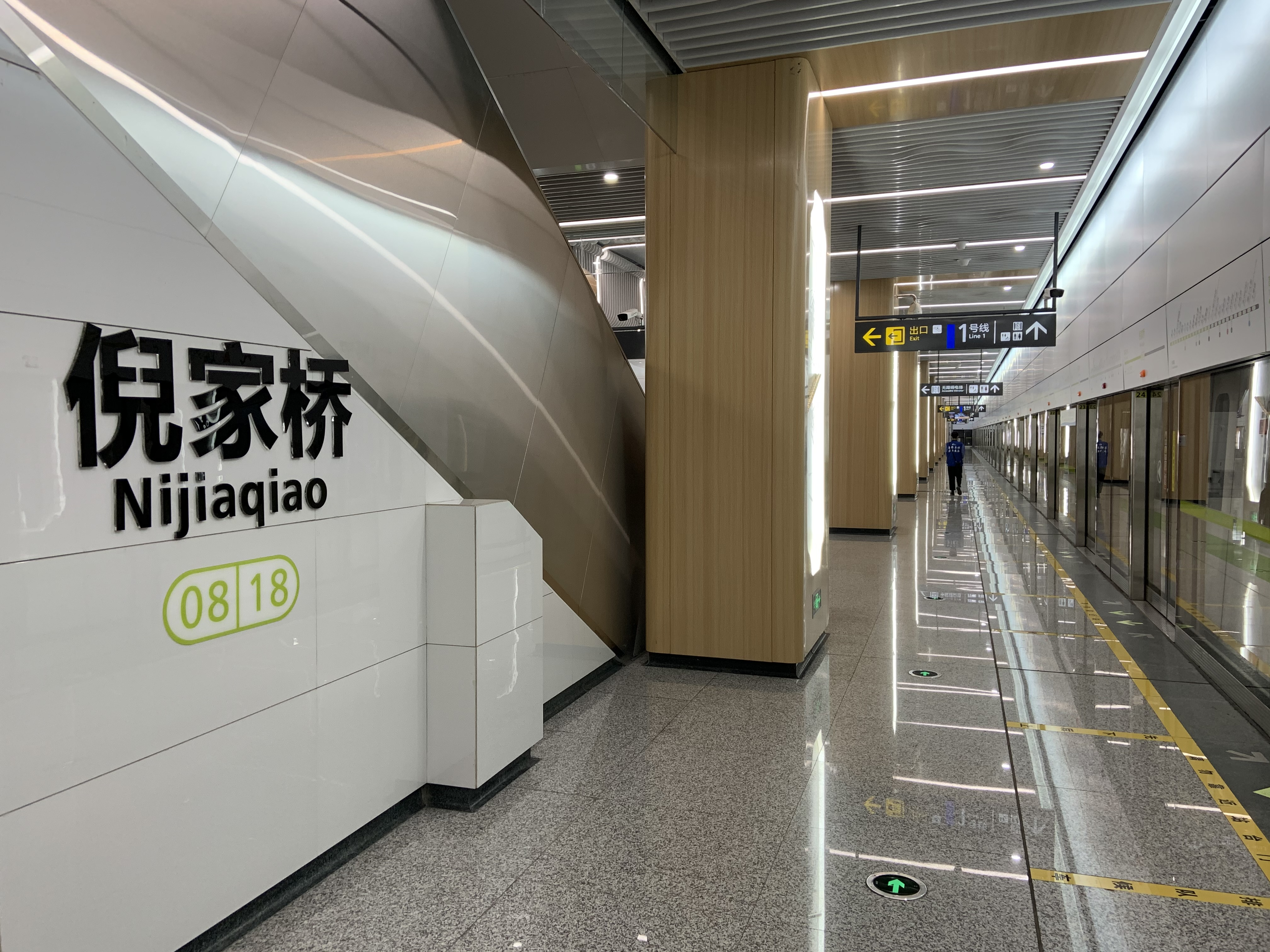
- Line 8 platform

General information
- Location: Wuhou District, Chengdu, Sichuan; China
- Coordinates: 30.6249°N 104.0610°E
- Operator: Chengdu Metro Limited
- Lines: Line 1 Line 8
- Platforms: 4 (2 island platforms)

Other information
- Station code: 0111 0818

History
- Opened: 27 September 2010

Services
Preceding station	Chengdu Metro	Following station
Sichuan Gymnasium towards Weijianian	Line 1	Tongzilin towards Science City or Wugensong
Sichuan University Wangjiang Campus towards Guilong Road	Line 8	Fangcao Street towards Longgang
Location

Nijiaqiao (Chinese: 倪家桥) is an interchange station on Line 1 and Line 8 of the Chengdu Metro in China.

== Station layout ==
G	Entrances and Exits	Exits A, B, D-F
B1	Concourse	Faregates, Station Agent
B2	Northbound	← Line 1 towards Weijianian (Sichuan Gymnasium)
B2	Island platform, doors open on the left
B2	Southbound	Line 1 towards Science City (Tongzilin) →
B3	Northbound	← Line 8 towards Guilong Road (Sichuan University Wangjiang Campus)
B3	Island platform, doors open on the left
B3	Southbound	Line 8 towards Lianhua (Fangcao Street) →

== Gallery ==
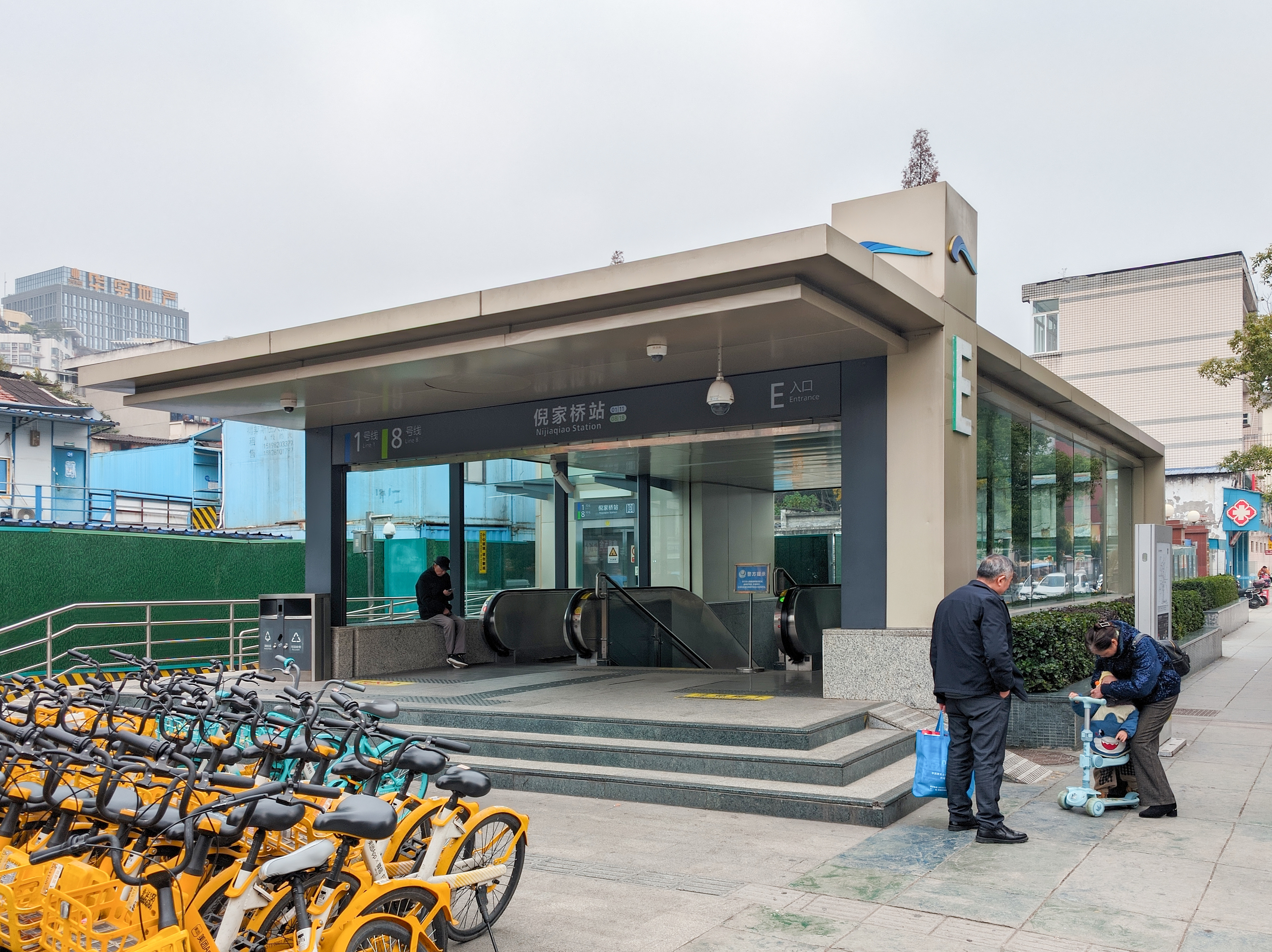
Entrance E

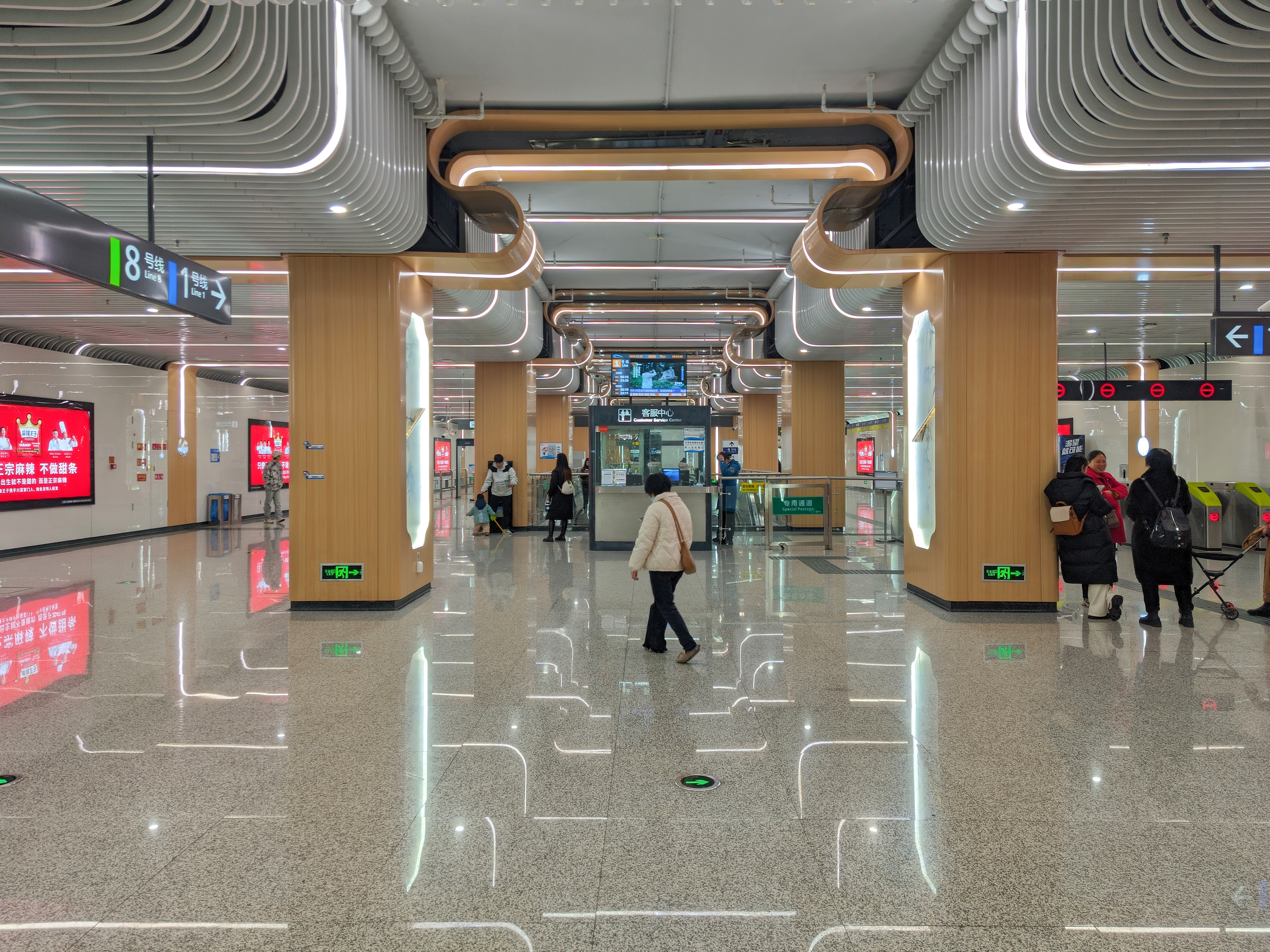
Concourse

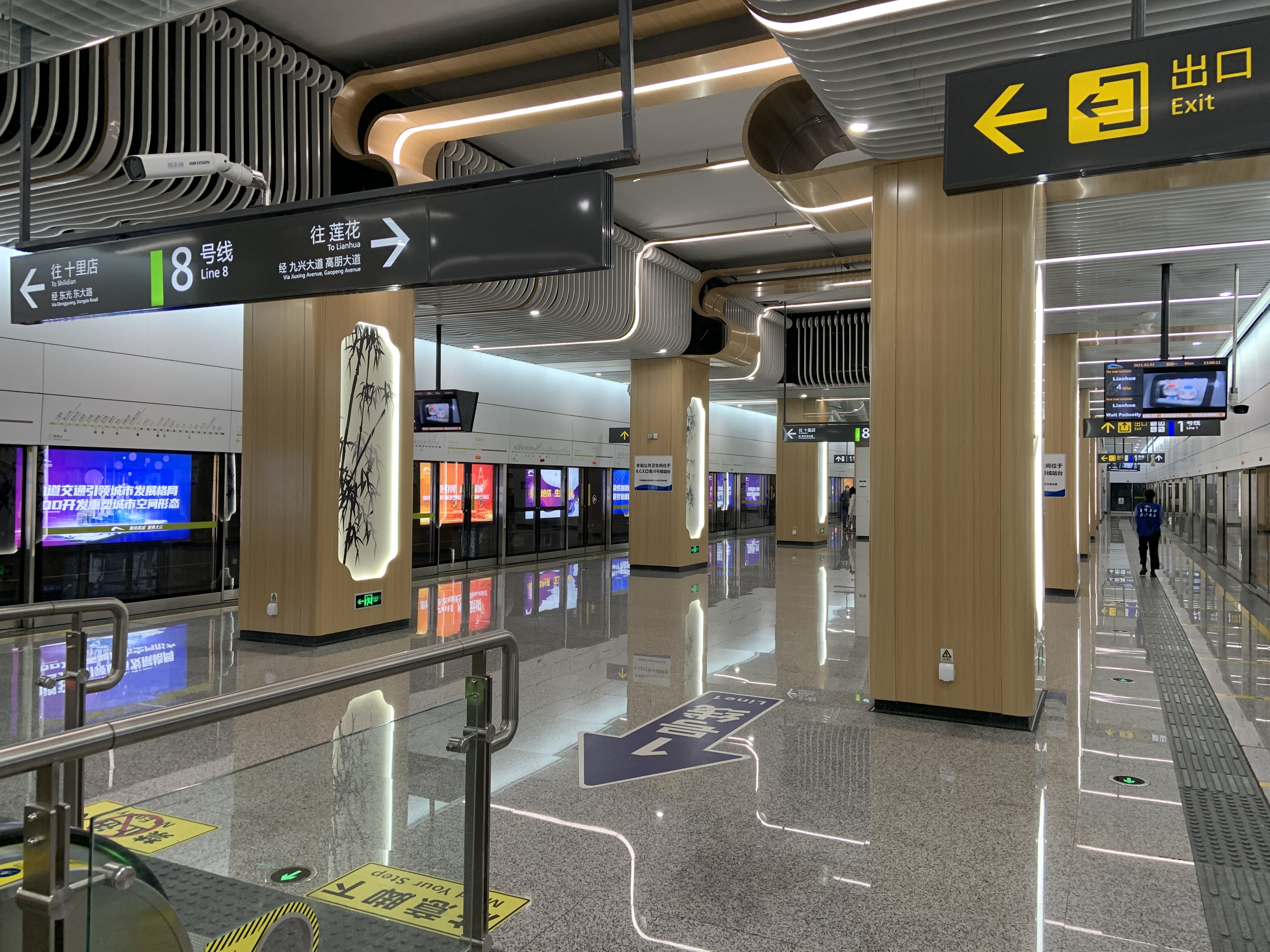
Line 1 platform

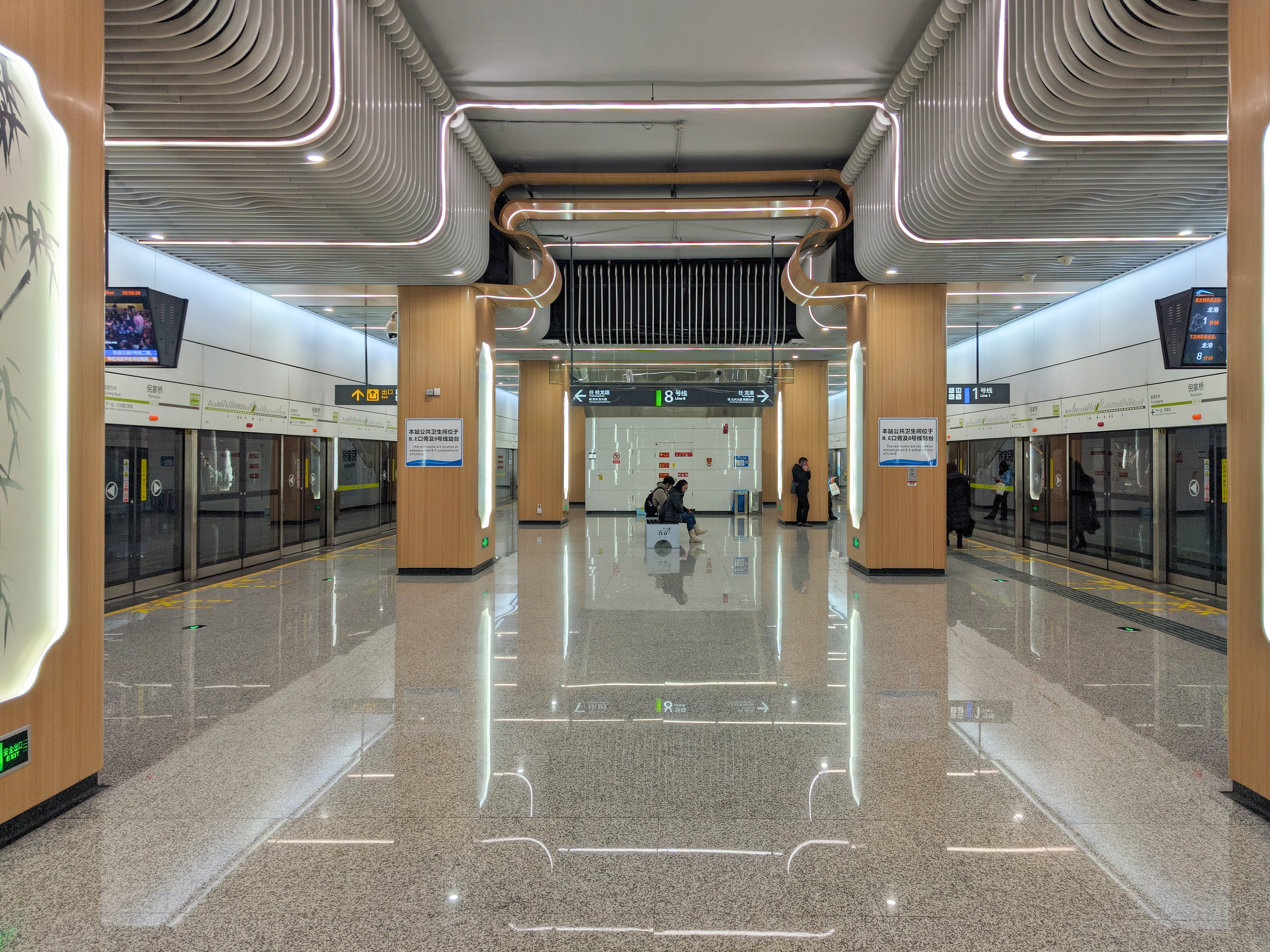
Line 8 platform
