= Zhujiang Road station (Chengdu Metro) =

Metro station in Chengdu, China

Zhujiang Road 珠江路
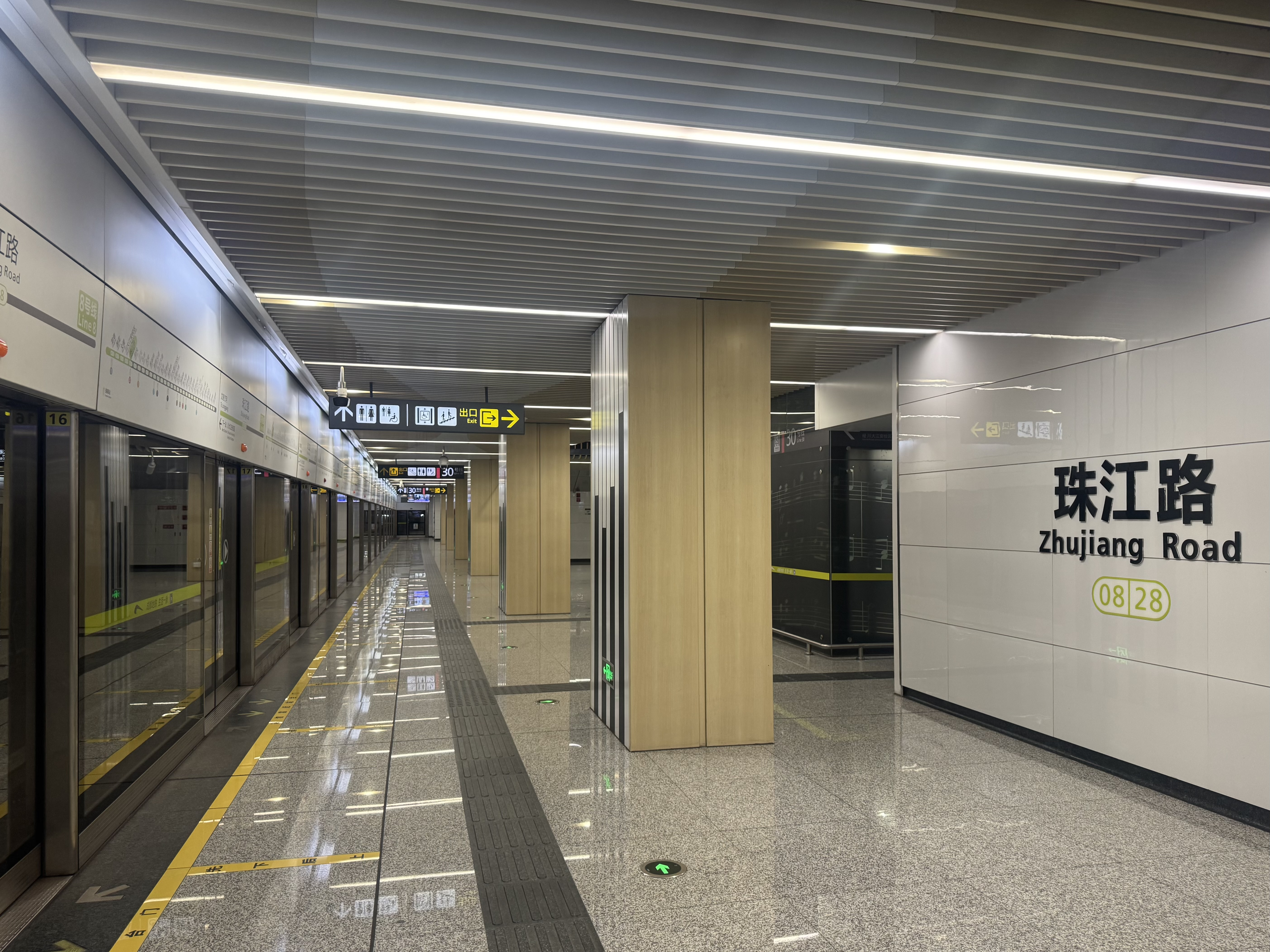
- Line 8 platform

General information
- Location: Shuangliu District, Chengdu, Sichuan; China
- Coordinates: 30.5689°N 104.0057°E
- Operated by: Chengdu Metro Limited
- Lines: Line 8 Line 30
- Platforms: 4 (2 island platforms)

Other information
- Station code: 0828; 3019

History
- Opened: 18 December 2020 (Line 8); 16 December 2025 (Line 30)

Services
Preceding station	Chengdu Metro	Following station
Shunfeng towards Guilong Road	Line 8	Sichuan University Jiang'an Campus towards Longgang
Datong towards Longquanyi Railway Station South	Line 30	Xiejiadu towards East of Terminal 2 of Shuangliu International Airport
Location

Zhujiang Road Station is a metro station at Chengdu, Sichuan, China. It was opened on December 18, 2020 with the opening of Chengdu Metro Line 8 and December 16, 2025 with the opening of Chengdu Metro Line 30.

== Gallery ==
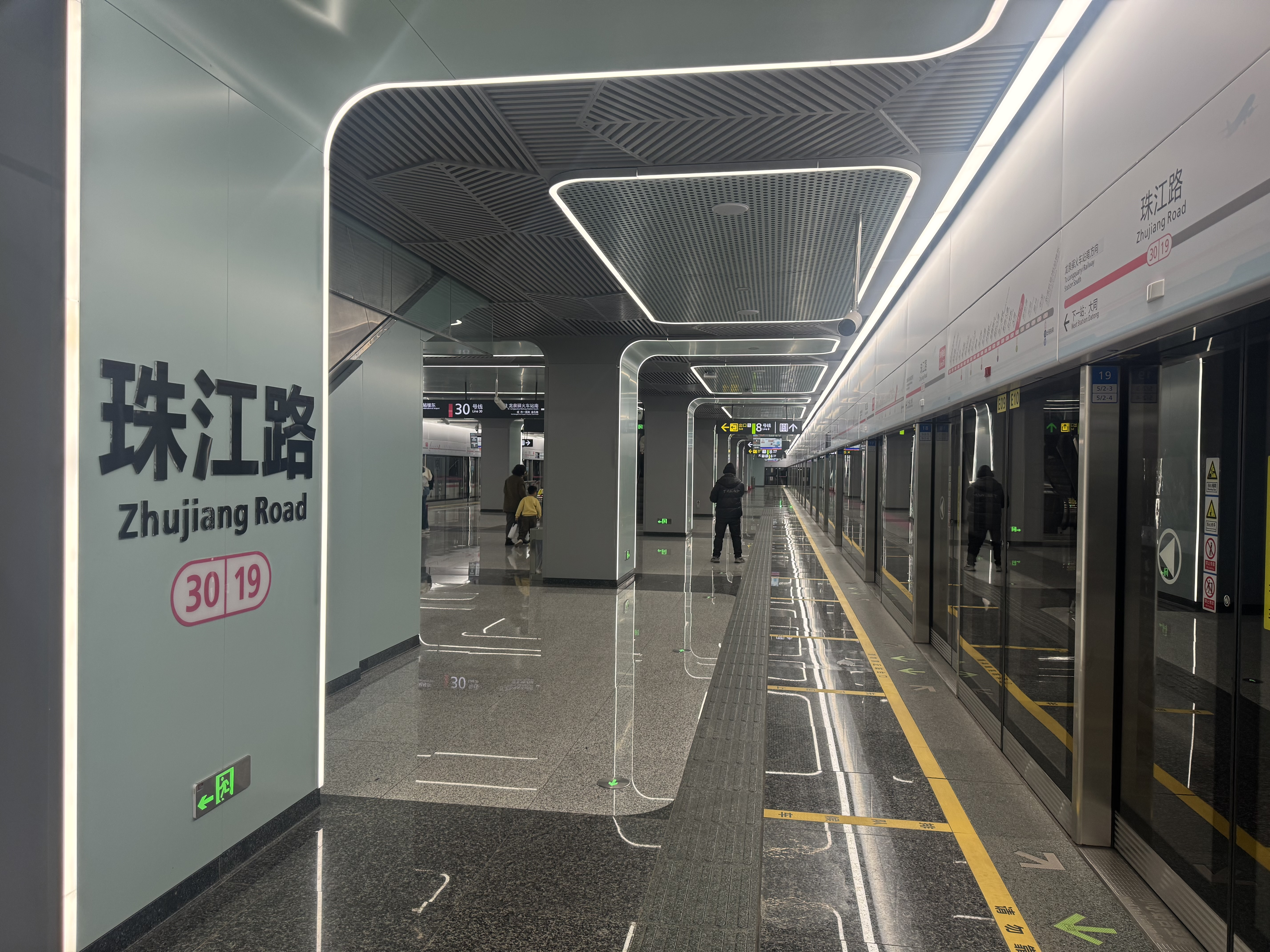
Line 30 platform
