= Sichuan University Wangjiang Campus station =

Metro station in Chengdu, China

Sichuan University Wangjiang Campus 川大望江校区
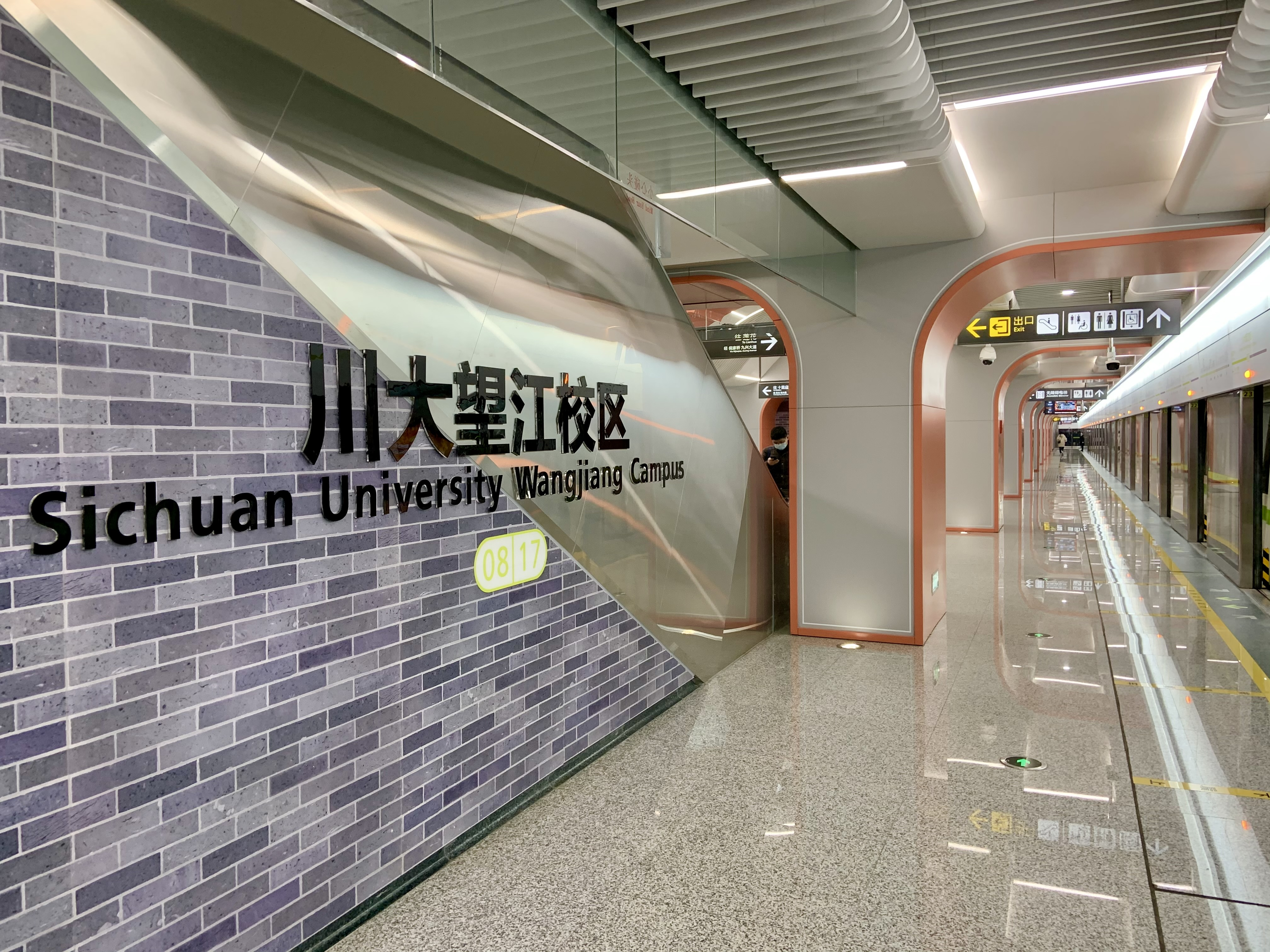

General information
- Location: Wuhou District, Chengdu, Sichuan; China
- Operated by: Chengdu Metro Limited
- Line: Line 8
- Platforms: 2 (1 island platform)

Other information
- Station code: 0817

History
- Opened: 18 December 2020

Services
Preceding station	Chengdu Metro	Following station
Donghu Park towards Guilong Road	Line 8	Nijiaqiao towards Longgang
Location

Sichuan University Wangjiang Campus Station is a metro station at Chengdu, Sichuan, China. It was opened on December 18, 2020 with the opening of Chengdu Metro Line 8. The station serves the nearby Wangjiang Campus of Sichuan University. Exit A provides direct access to the west gate of the Wangjiang Campus of Sichuan University.

== Gallery ==
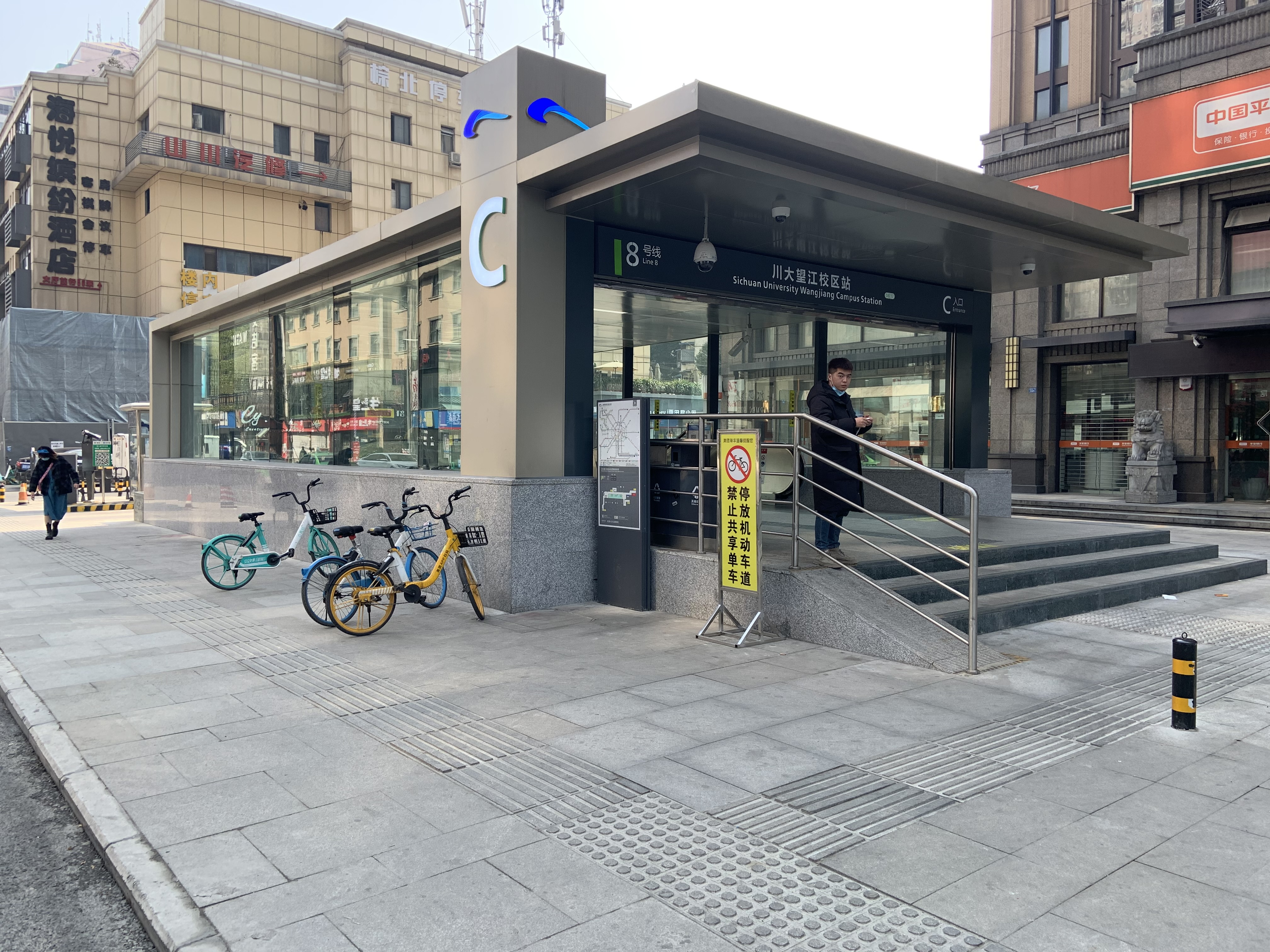
Entrance C

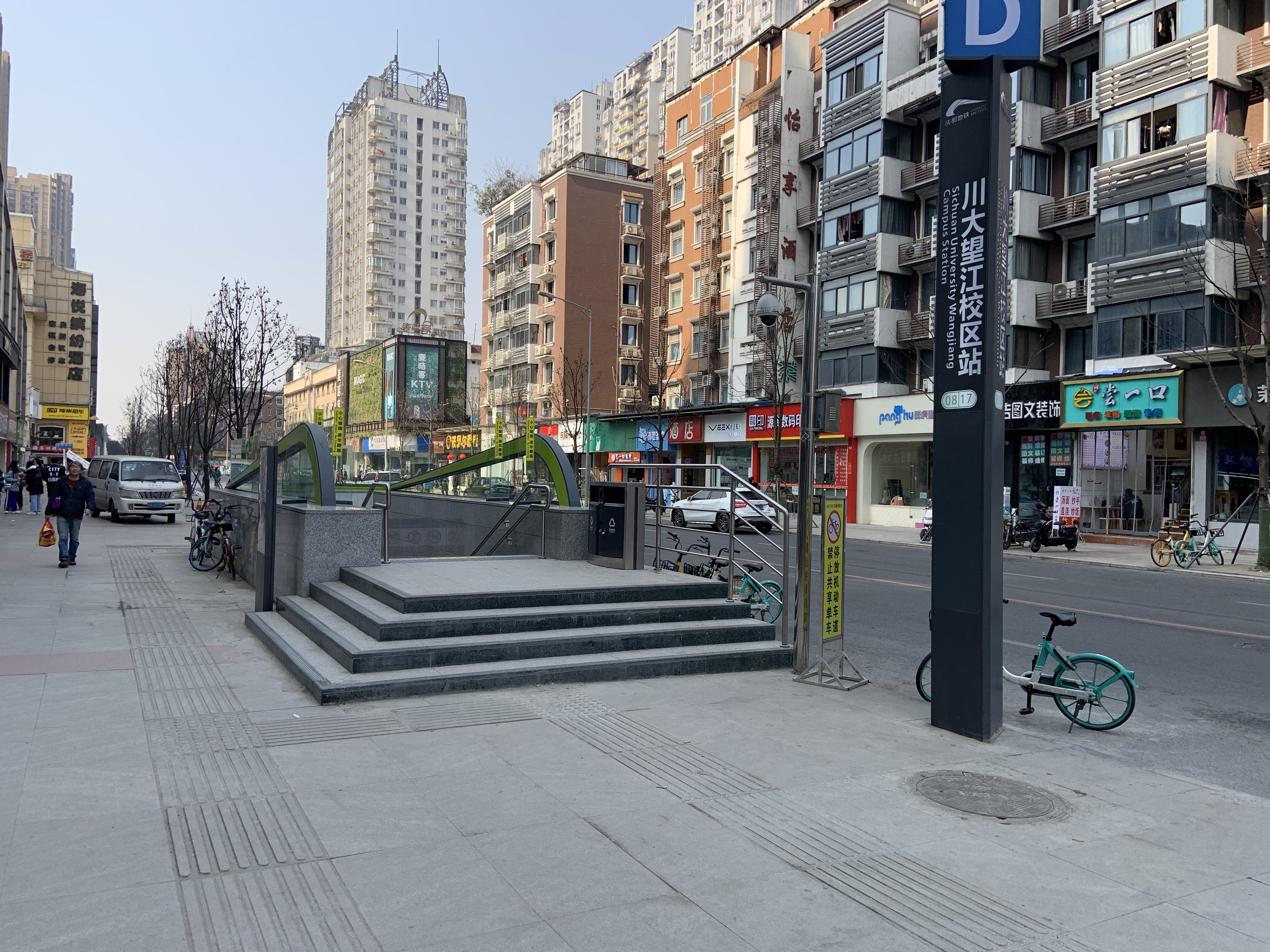
Entrance D

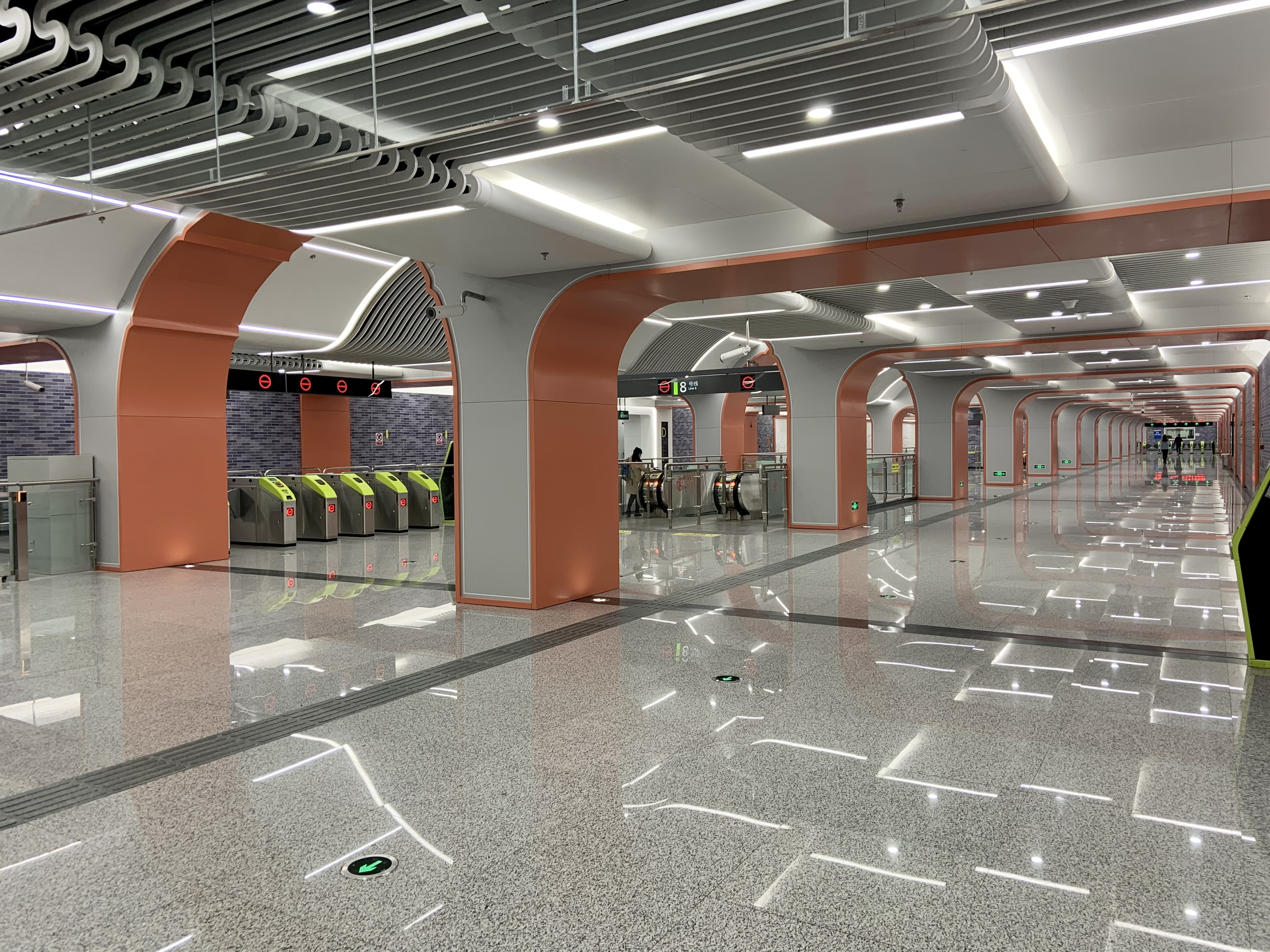
Concourse

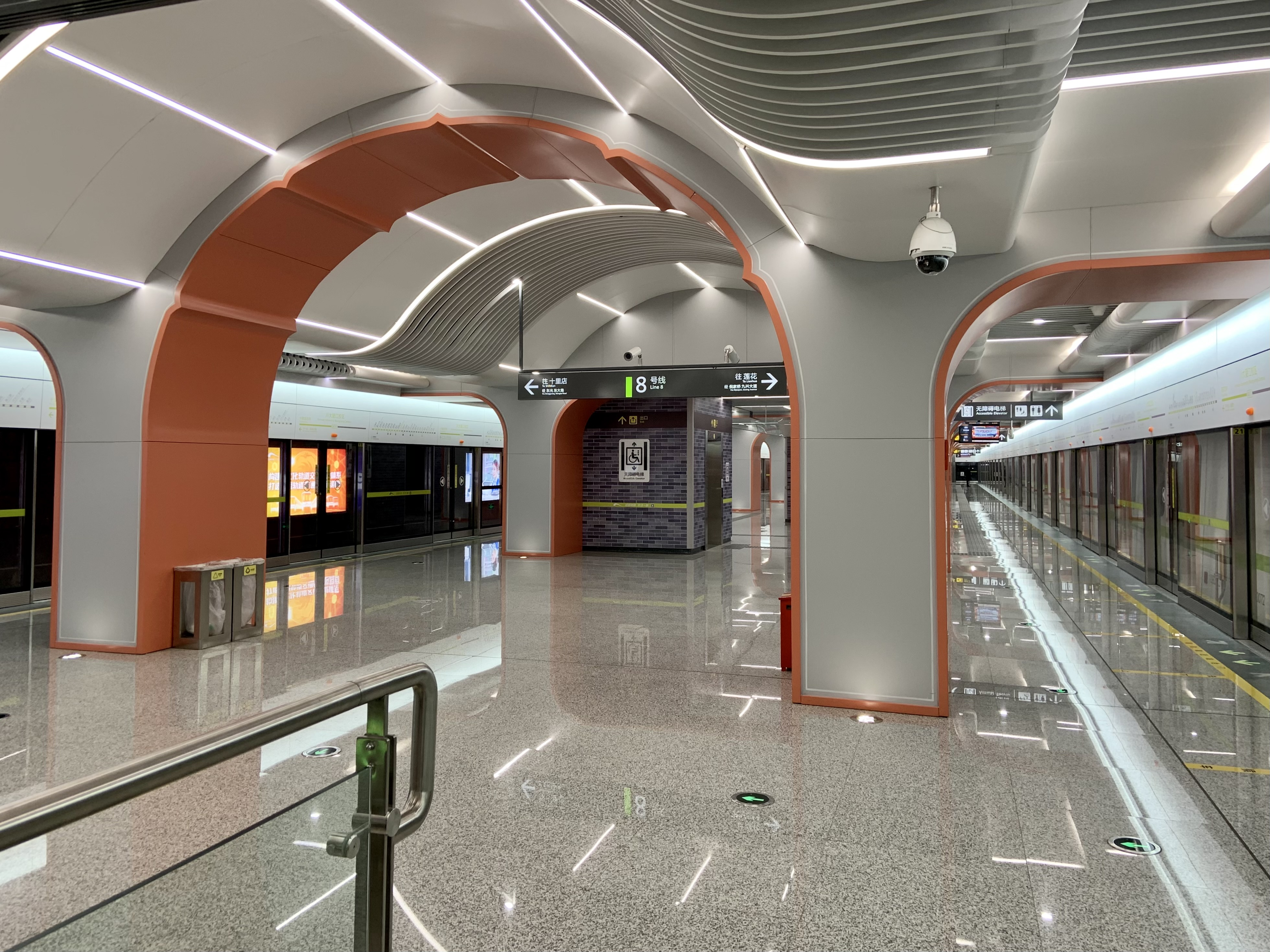
Platform
