= Yongfeng station (Chengdu Metro) =

Metro station in Chengdu, China

Yongfeng 永丰
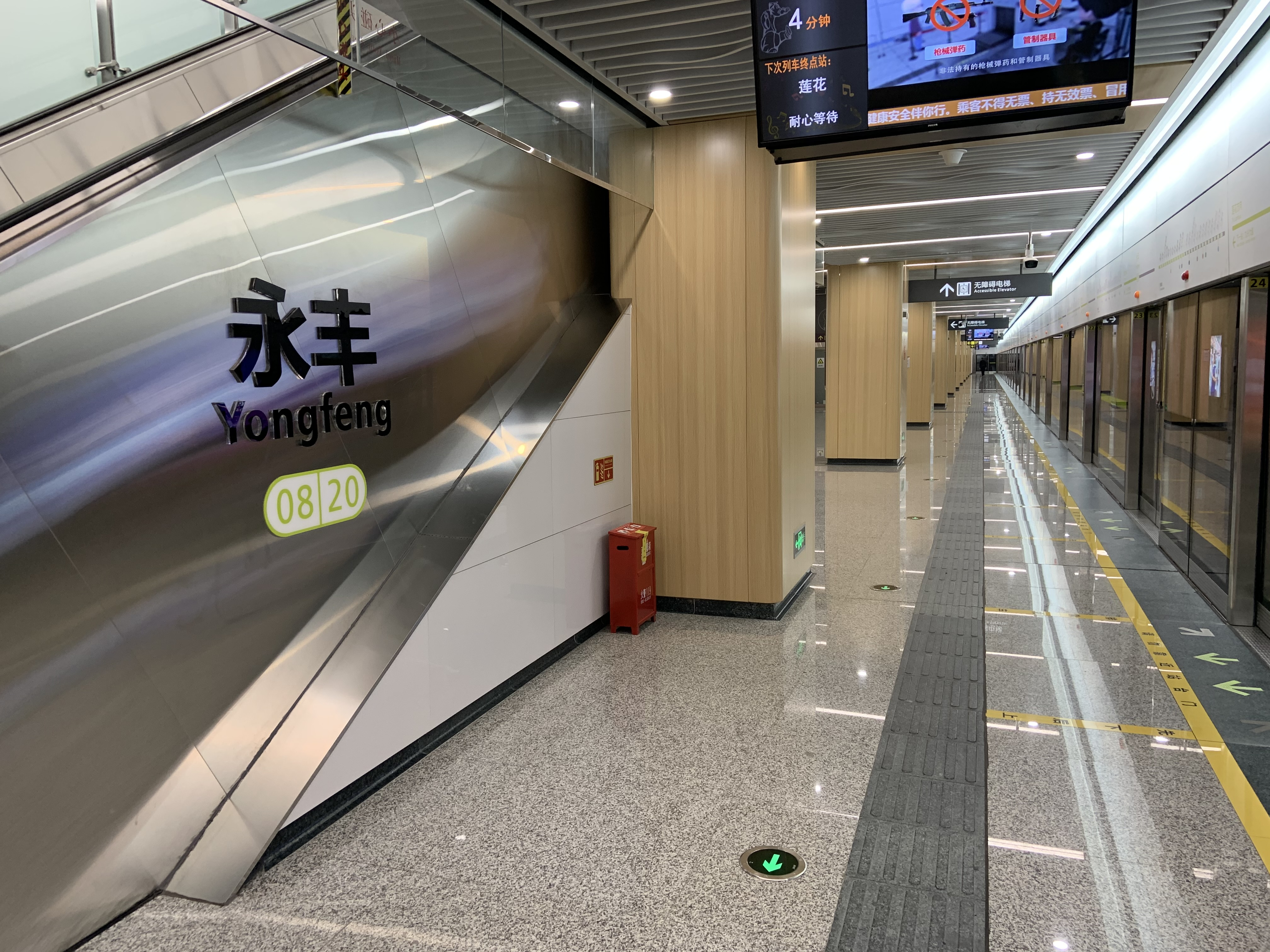

General information
- Location: Wuhou District, Chengdu, Sichuan; China
- Operated by: Chengdu Metro Limited
- Line: Line 8
- Platforms: 2 (1 island platform)

Other information
- Station code: 0820

History
- Opened: 18 December 2020

Services
Preceding station	Chengdu Metro	Following station
Fangcao Street towards Guilong Road	Line 8	Jiuxing Avenue towards Longgang
Location

Yongfeng Station is a metro station at Chengdu, Sichuan, China. It was opened on December 18, 2020, with the opening of Chengdu Metro Line 8.

== Gallery ==
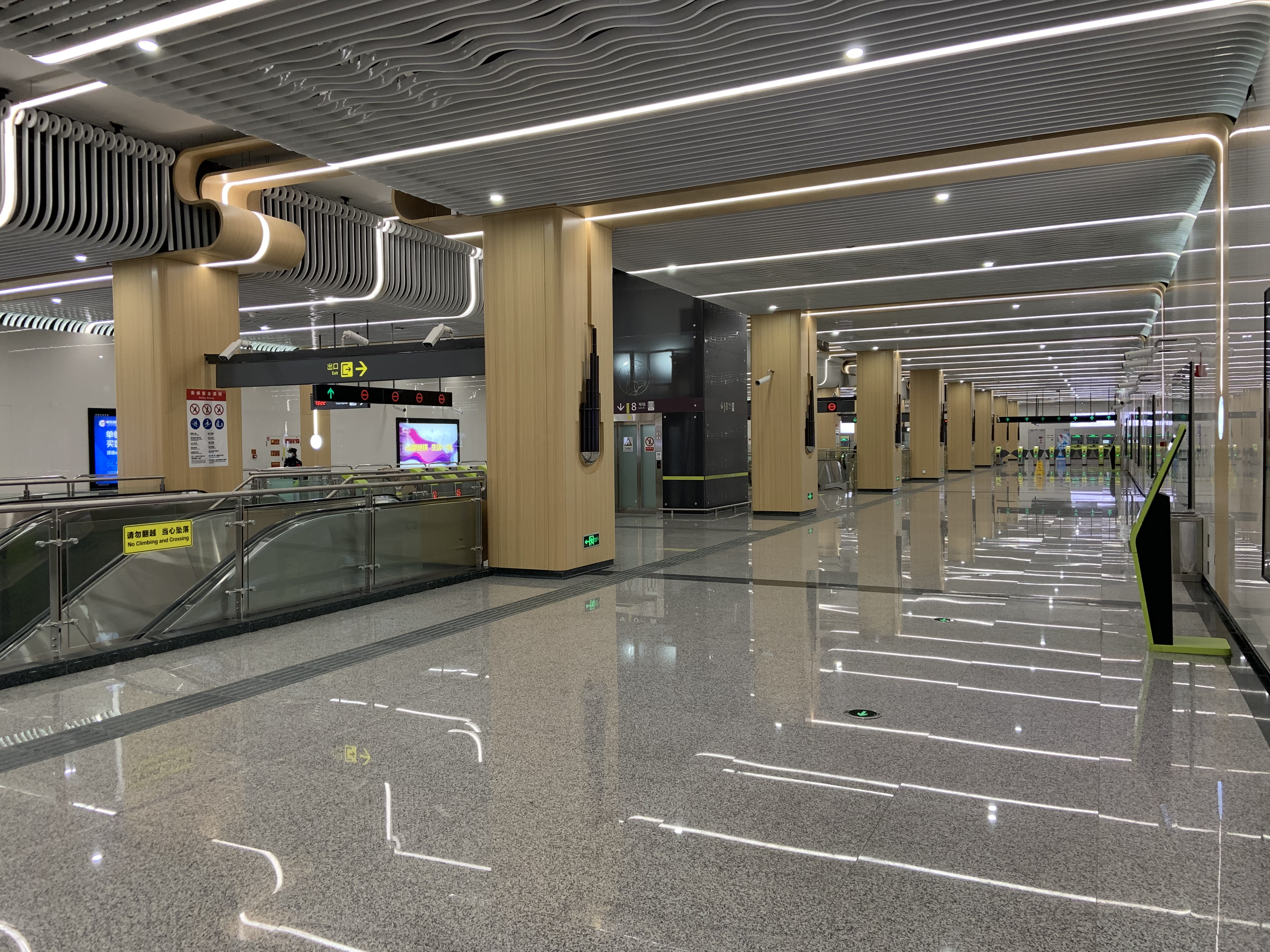
Concourse

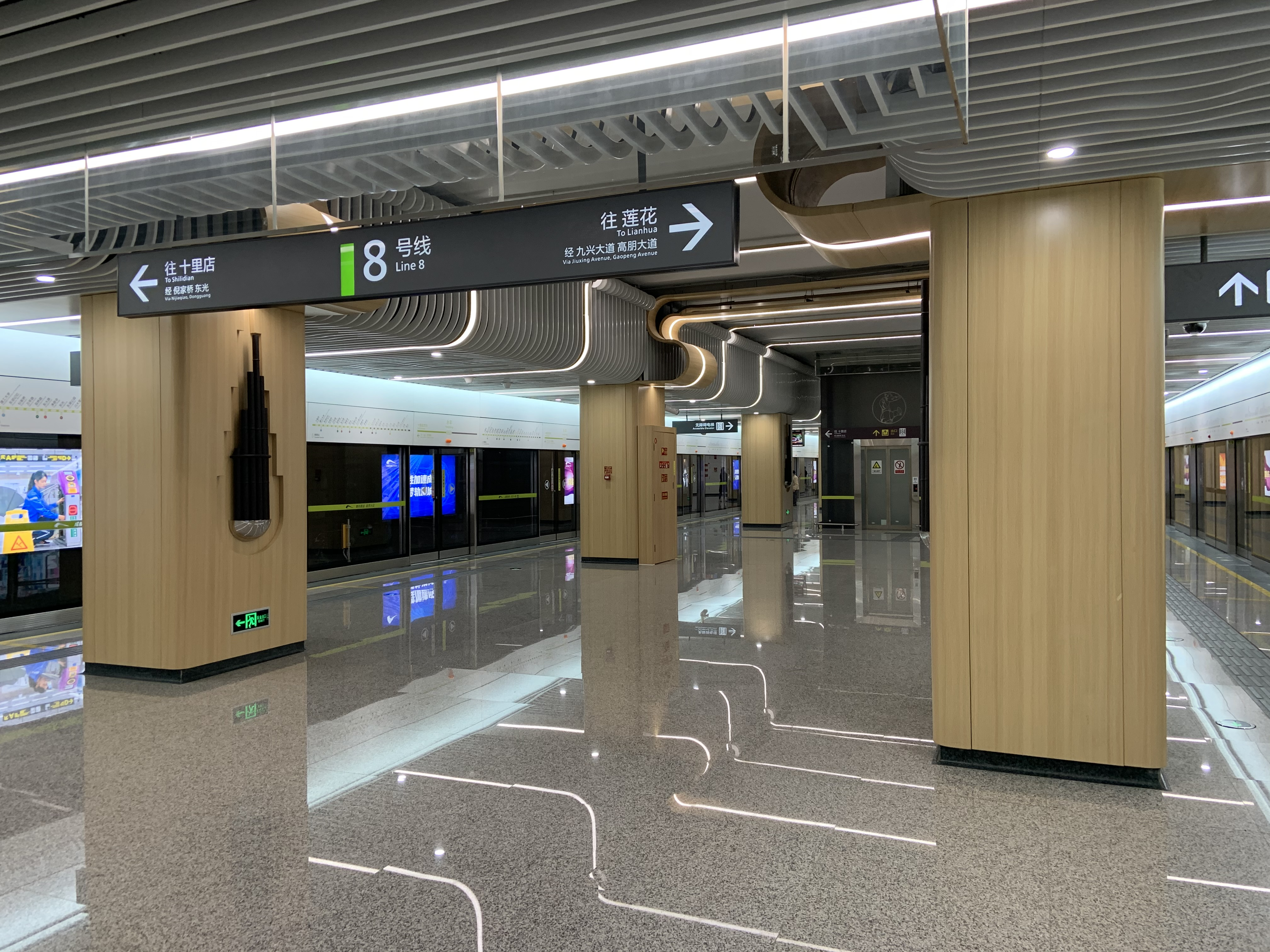
Platform
