= Sanyuan station =

Metro station in Chengdu, China

Sanyuan 三元
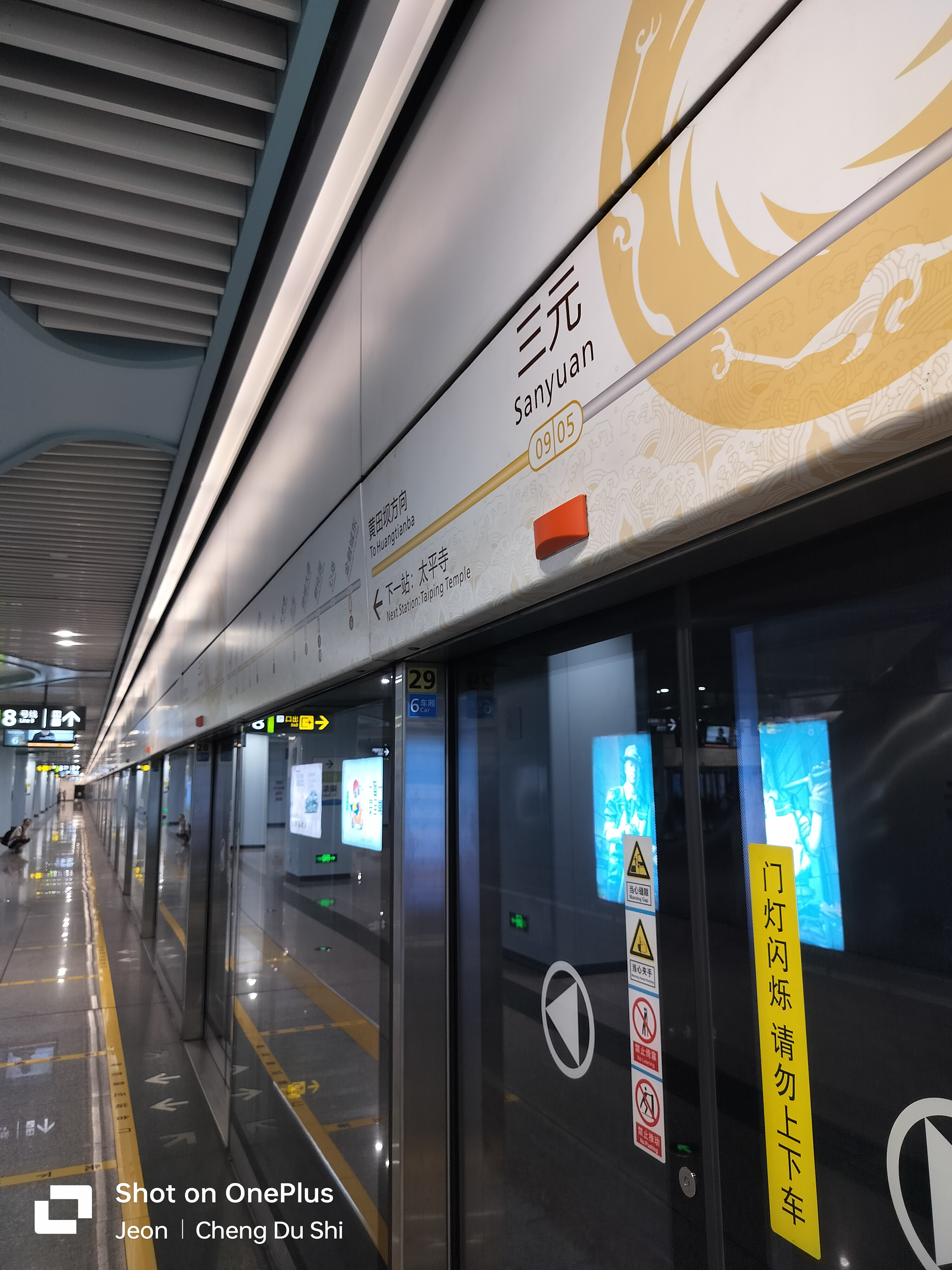
- Line 9 platform

General information
- Location: Wuhou District, Chengdu, Sichuan; China
- Operated by: Chengdu Metro Limited
- Lines: Line 8 Line 9
- Platforms: 4 (2 island platforms)

Other information
- Station code: 0826 0905

History
- Opened: 18 December 2020

Services
| Preceding station | Chengdu Metro | Following station |
|---|---|---|
| Shiyang towards Guilong Road | Line 8 | Shunfeng towards Longgang |
| Jincheng Avenue towards Financial City East | Line 9 | Taiping Temple towards Huangtianba |
Location

Sanyuan Station is a metro station at Chengdu, Sichuan, China. It was opened on December 18, 2020 with the opening of Chengdu Metro Line 8 and Line 9.
