= Fangcao Street station =

Metro station in Chengdu, China

Coordinates: 30.6283°N 104.0501°E

Fangcao Street 芳草街
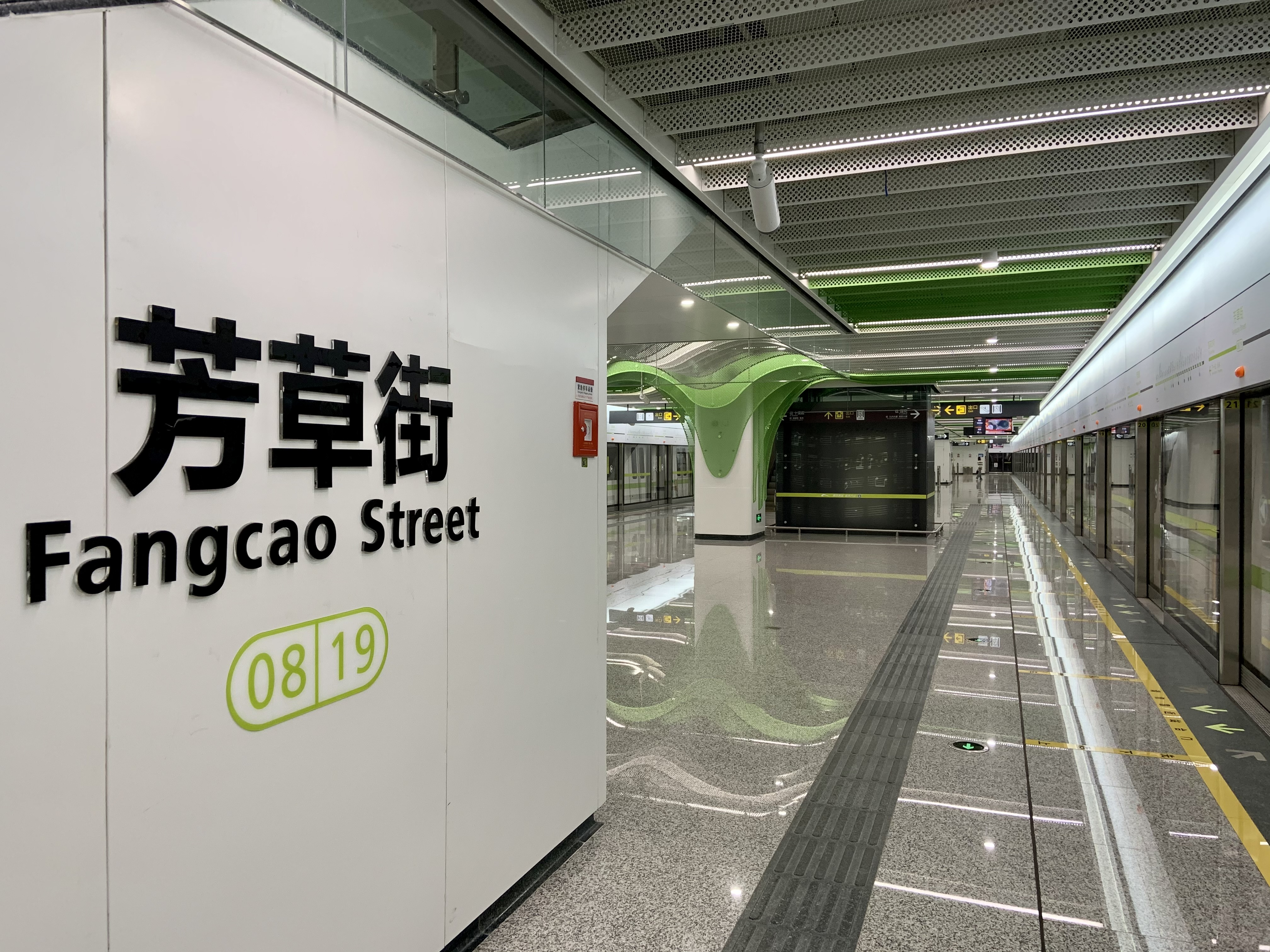

General information
- Location: Wuhou District, Chengdu, Sichuan; China
- Operated by: Chengdu Metro Limited
- Line(s): Line 8
- Platforms: 2 (1 island platform)

Other information
- Station code: 0819

History
- Opened: 18 December 2020

Services
| Preceding station | Chengdu Metro | Following station |
|---|---|---|
| Nijiaqiao towards Guilong Road | Line 8 | Yongfeng towards Longgang |

Fangcao Street Station is a metro station at Chengdu, Sichuan, China. It was opened on December 18, 2020 with the opening of Chengdu Metro Line 8.

== Gallery ==
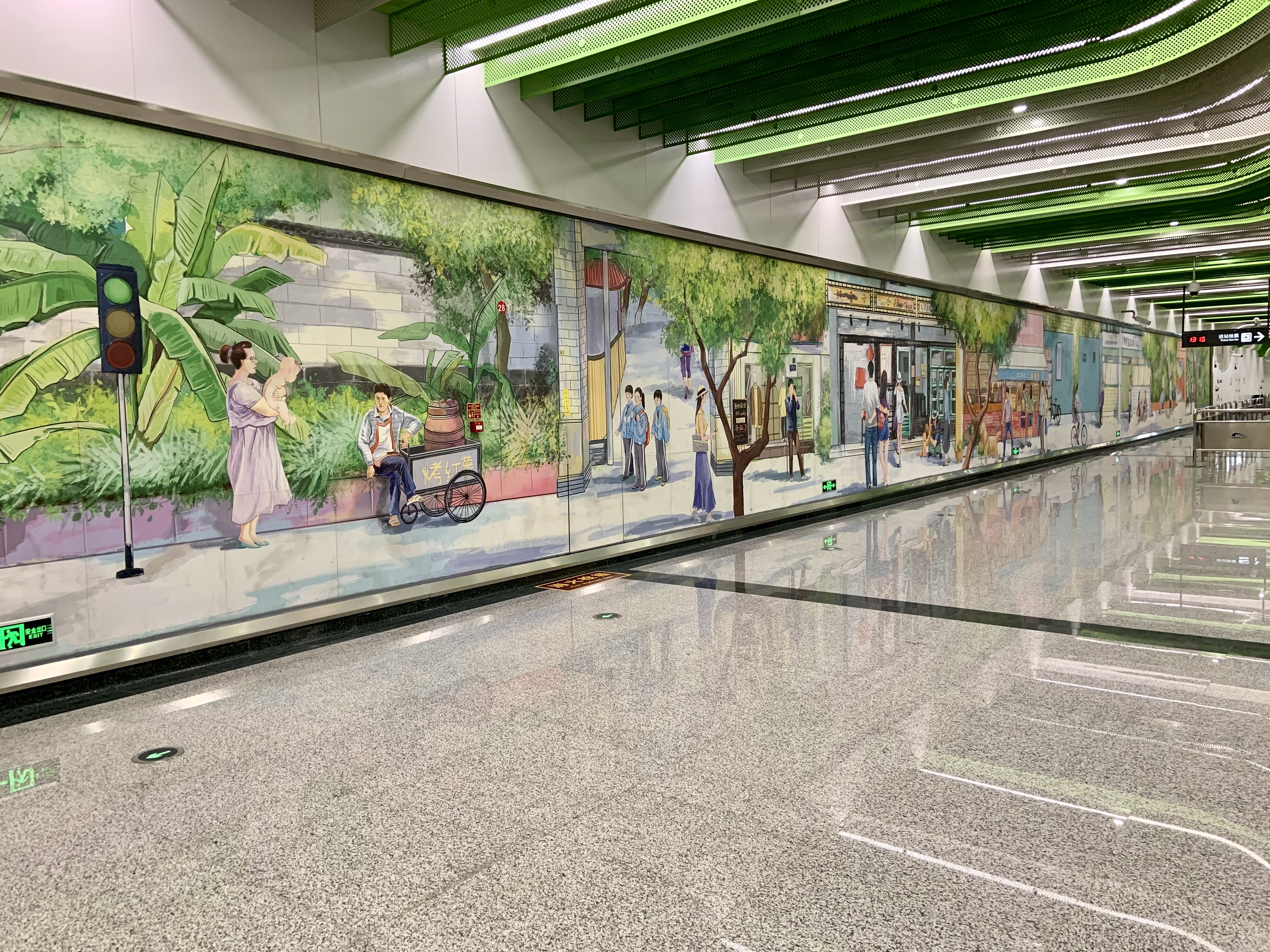
Art wall

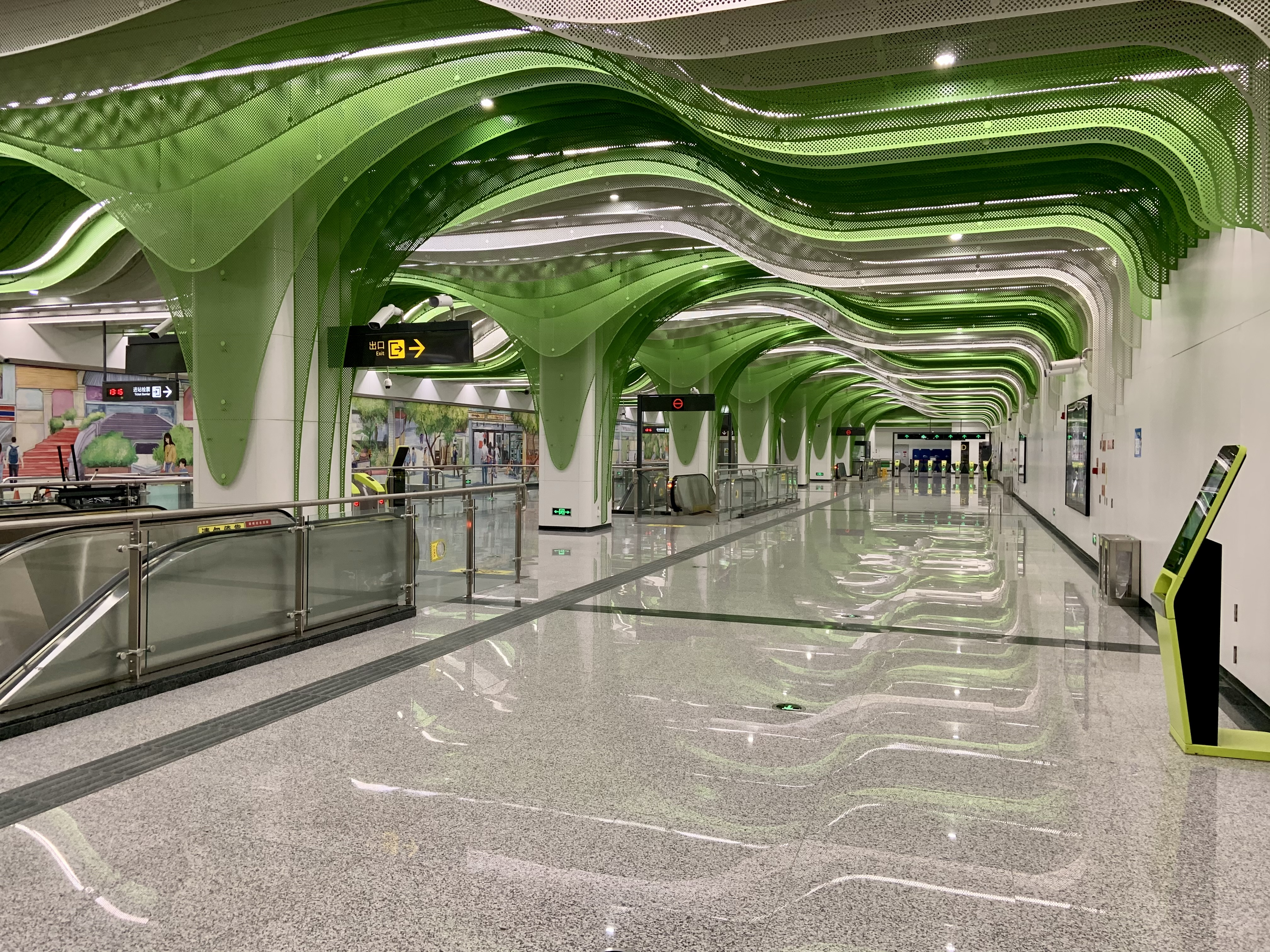
Concourse

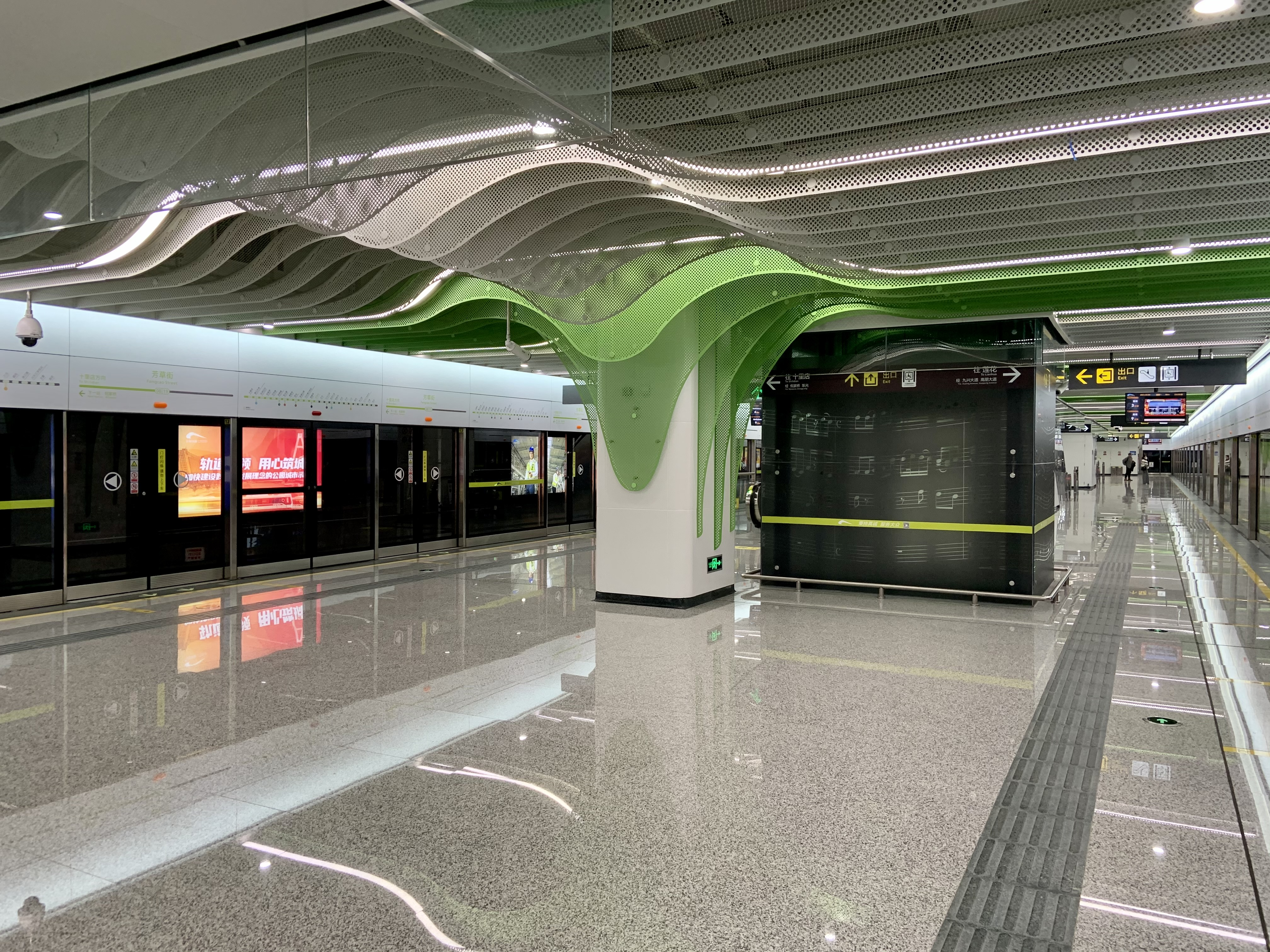
Platform
