= Shunfeng station =

Metro station in Chengdu, China

Shunfeng 顺风

General information
- Location: Shuangliu District, Chengdu, Sichuan; China
- Operated by: Chengdu Metro Limited
- Line: Line 8
- Platforms: 2 (1 island platform)

Other information
- Station code: 0827

History
- Opened: 18 December 2020

Services
Preceding station	Chengdu Metro	Following station
Sanyuan towards Guilong Road	Line 8	Zhujiang Road towards Longgang
Location

Shunfeng Station is a metro station at Chengdu, Sichuan, China. It was opened on December 18, 2020 with the opening of Chengdu Metro Line 8.
