= Donghu Park station =

Metro station in Chengdu, China

Coordinates: 30.6221°N 104.0853°E

Donghu Park 东湖公园
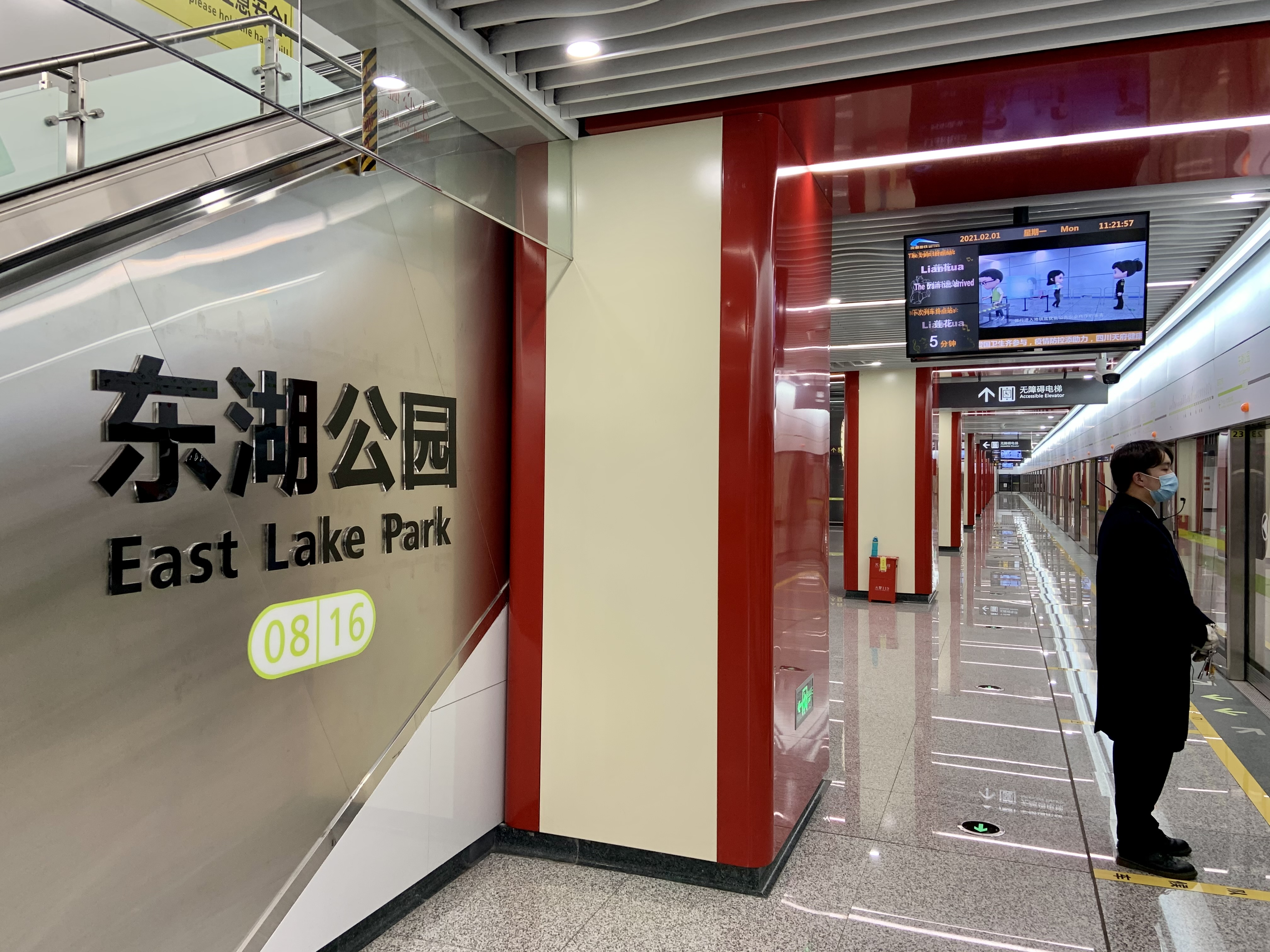

General information
- Location: Jinjiang District, Chengdu, Sichuan; China
- Operated by: Chengdu Metro Limited
- Line(s): Line 8
- Platforms: 2 (1 island platform)

Other information
- Station code: 0816

History
- Opened: 18 December 2020
- Previous names: East Lake Park Station

Services
Preceding station	Chengdu Metro	Following station
Dongguang towards Guilong Road	Line 8	Sichuan University Wangjiang Campus towards Longgang

Donghu Park Station , formerly known as East Lake Park Station, is a metro station at Chengdu, Sichuan, China. It was opened on December 18, 2020 with the opening of Chengdu Metro Line 8.

== Gallery ==
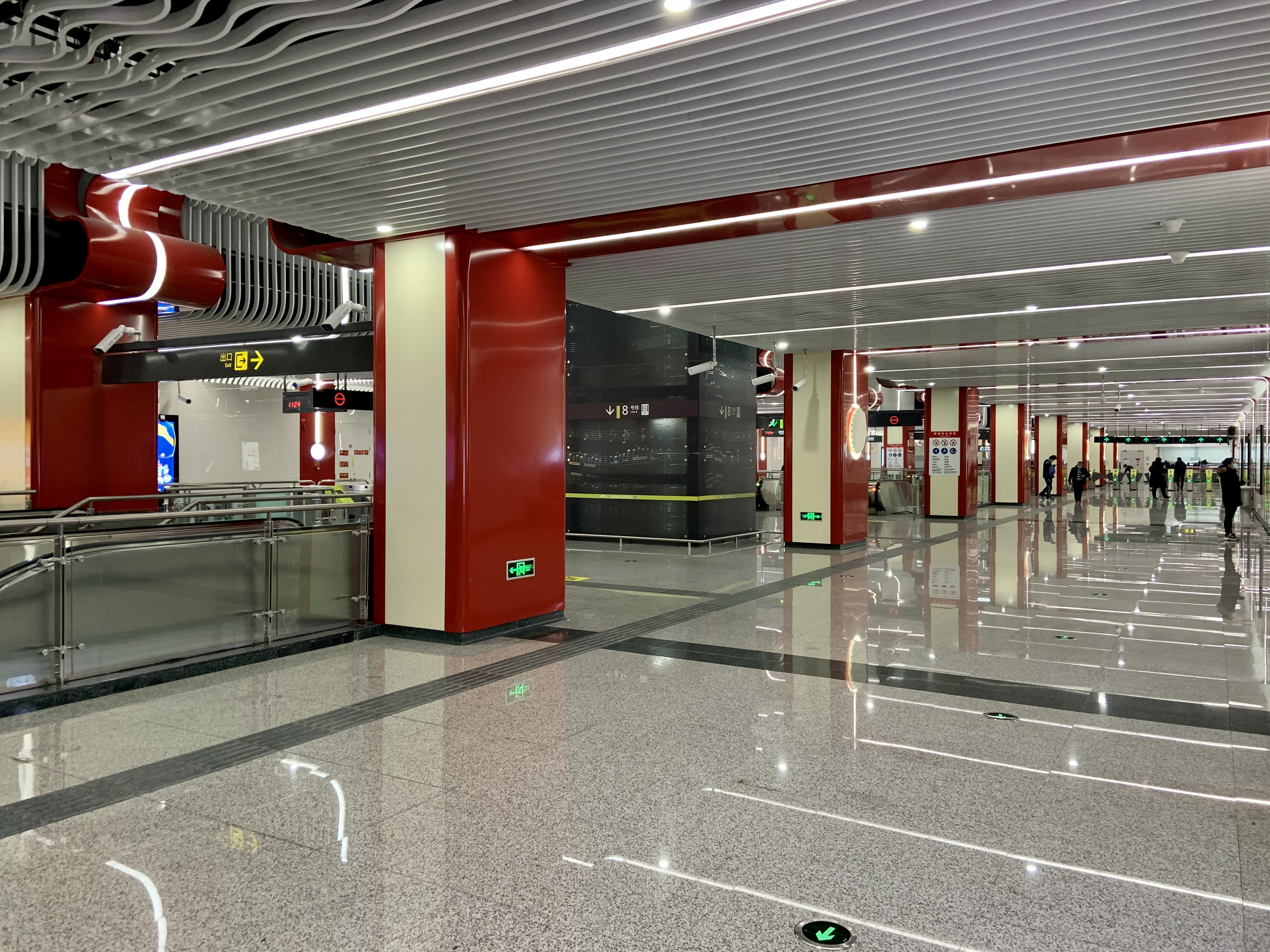
Concourse

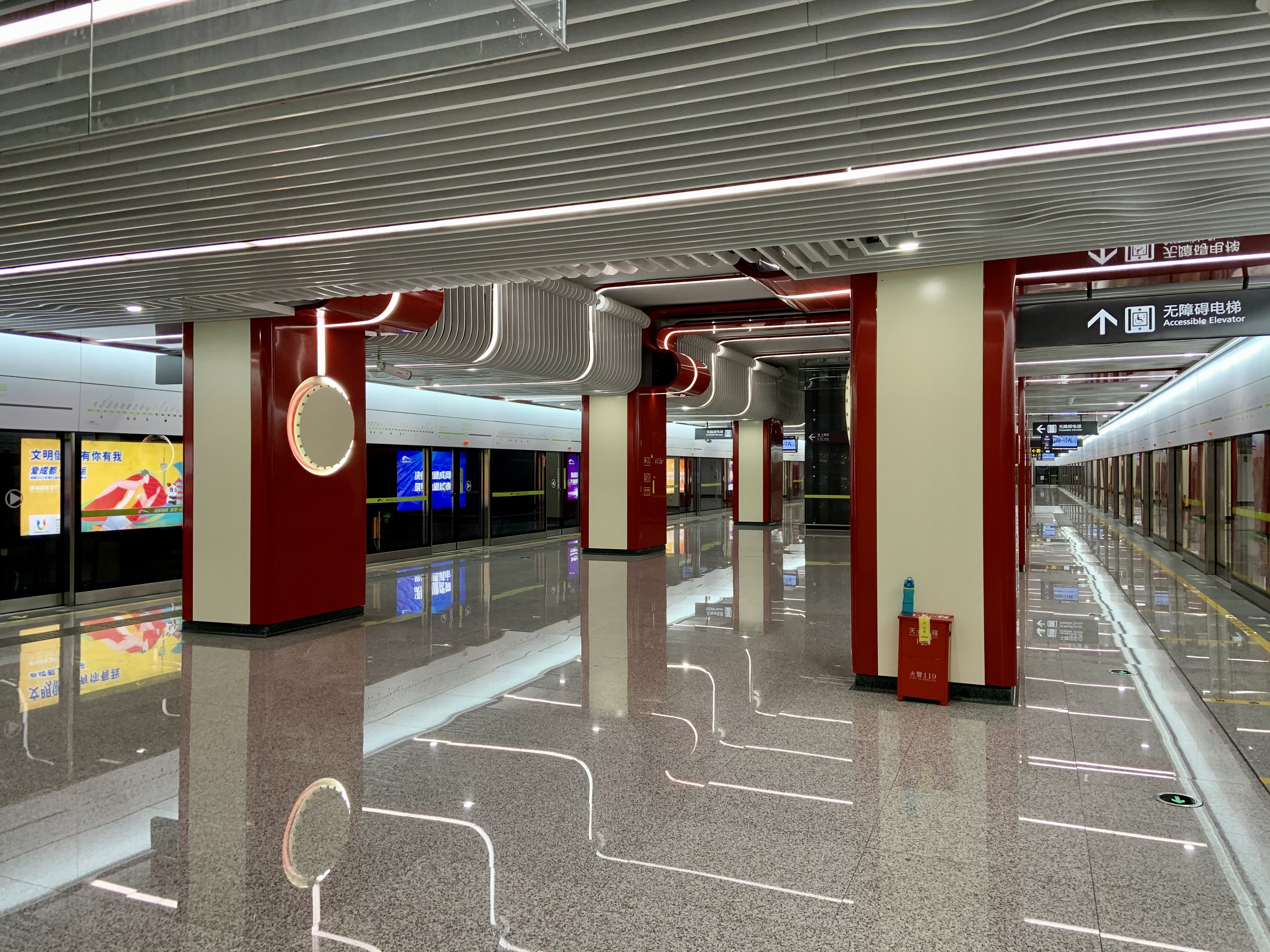
Platform
