= Dongguang station =

Metro station in Chengdu, China

Dongguang 东光
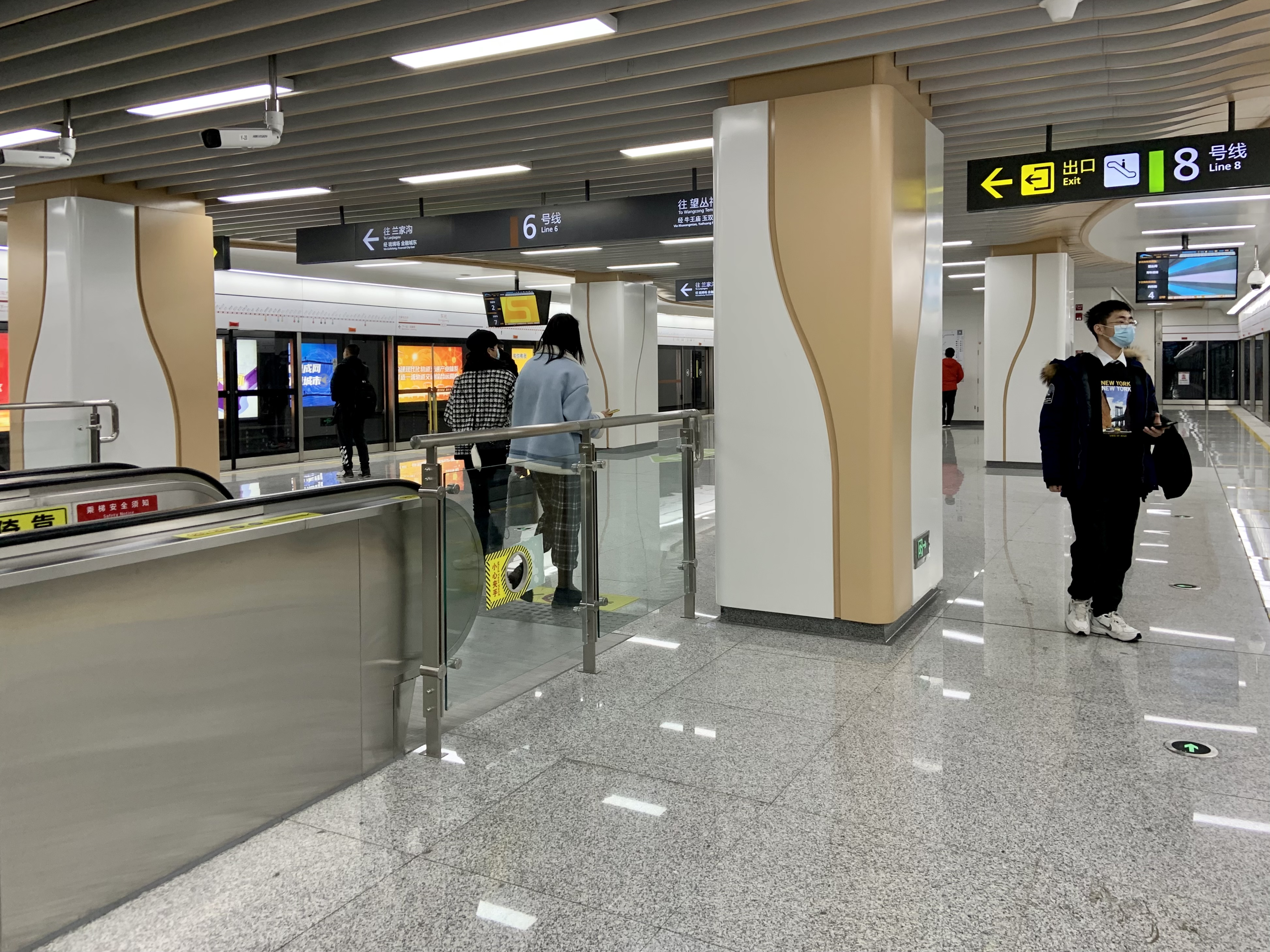
- Line 6 platform

General information
- Location: Jinjiang District, Chengdu, Sichuan; China
- Coordinates: 30.6220°N 104.0959°E
- Operated by: Chengdu Metro Limited
- Lines: Line 6 Line 8
- Platforms: 4 (2 island platforms)

Other information
- Station code: 0630 0815

History
- Opened: 18 December 2020

Services
Preceding station	Chengdu Metro	Following station
Sanguantang towards Wangcong Temple	Line 6	Liulichang towards Lanjiagou
Jingjusi towards Guilong Road	Line 8	Donghu Park towards Longgang
Location

Dongguang Station is a metro station in Chengdu, Sichuan, China. It was opened on December 18, 2020 with the opening of Chengdu Metro Line 6 and Line 8.

== Gallery ==
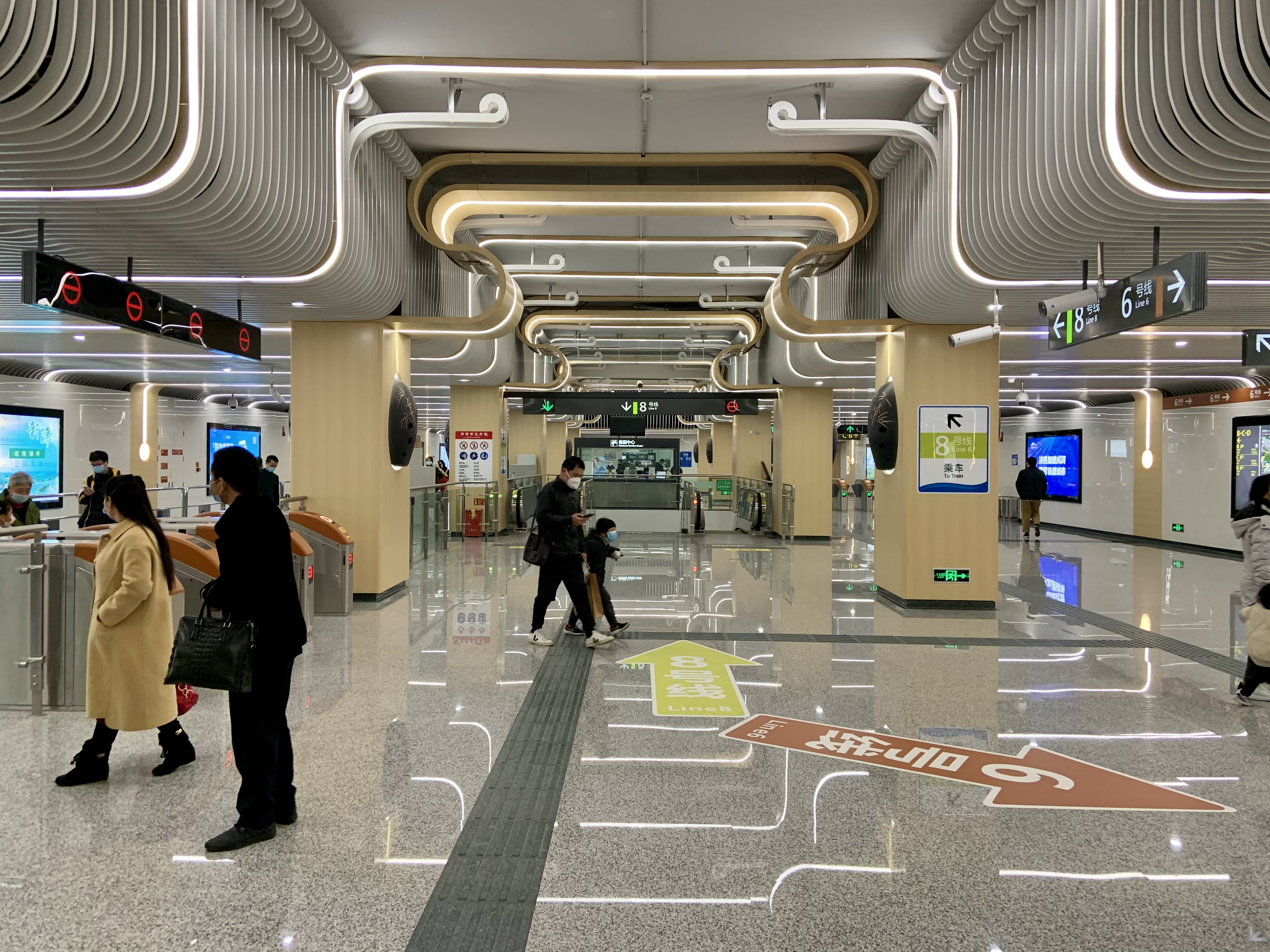
Concourse

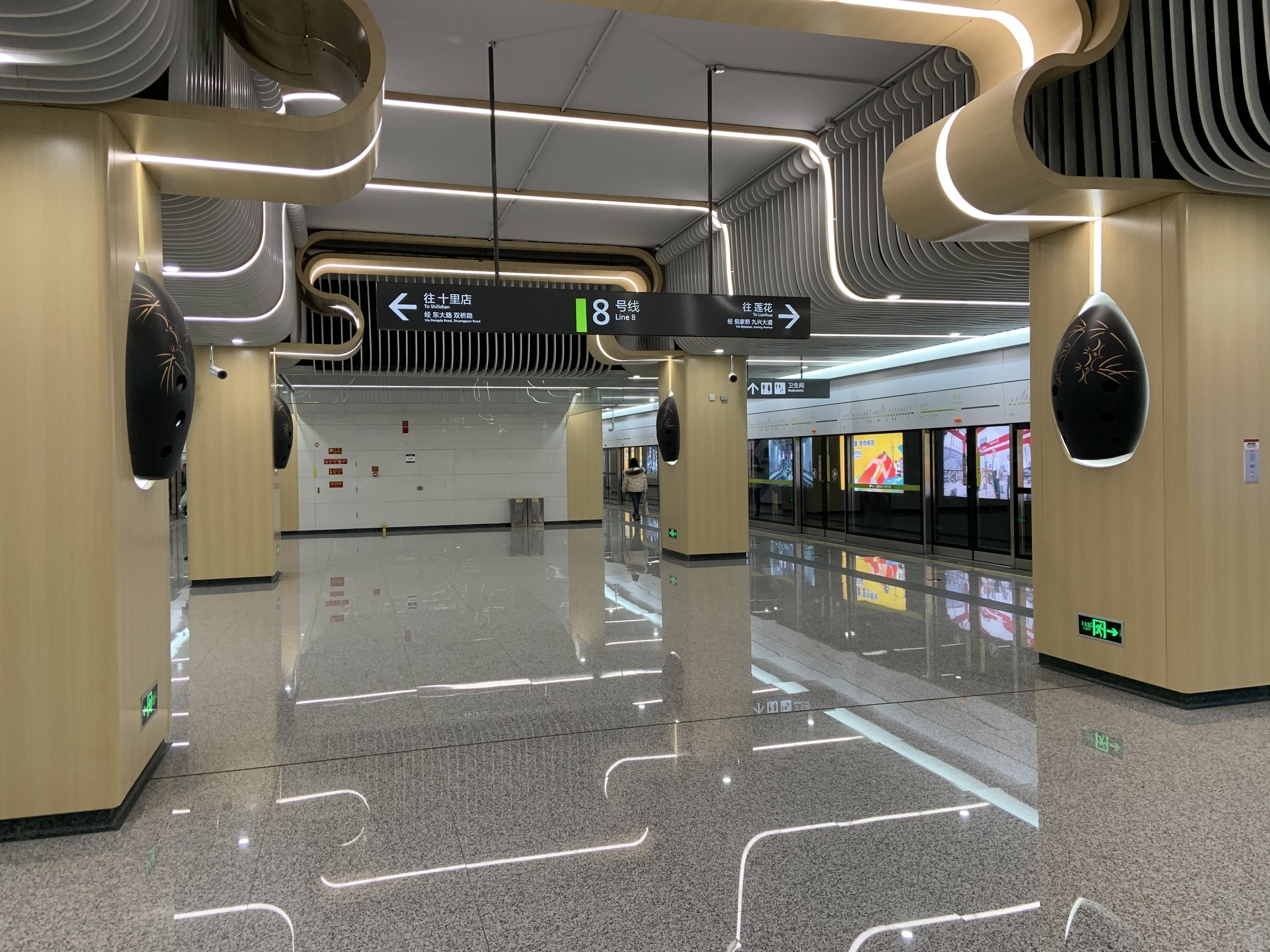
Line 8 platform
