= Shilidian station =

Metro station in Chengdu, China

Shilidian 十里店
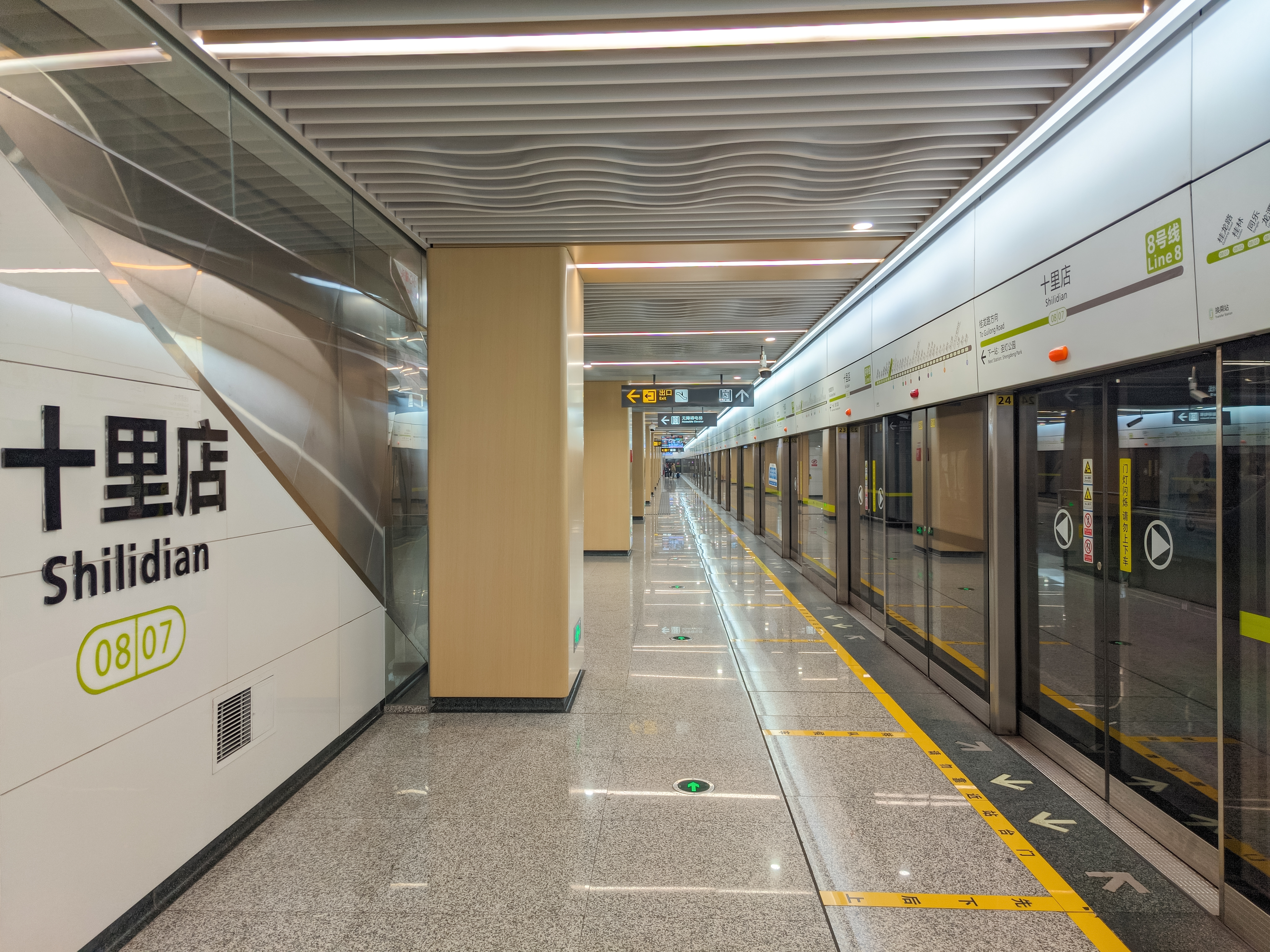
- Platform

General information
- Location: Shilidian Road, Chenghua Avenue (成华大道十里店路) × Donghua 1st/2nd Road (东华一/二路); Chenghua District, Chengdu, Sichuan; China
- Coordinates: 30°40′55″N 104°08′30″E
- Operated by: Chengdu Metro Limited
- Line: Line 8
- Platforms: 2 (1 island platform)

Other information
- Station code: 0807

History
- Opened: 18 December 2020

Services
Preceding station	Chengdu Metro	Following station
Shengdeng Park towards Guilong Road	Line 8	Chengdu University of Technology towards Longgang
Location

Shilidian Station is a metro station at Chengdu, Sichuan, China. It was opened on December 18, 2020 with the opening of Chengdu Metro Line 8.

== Gallery ==
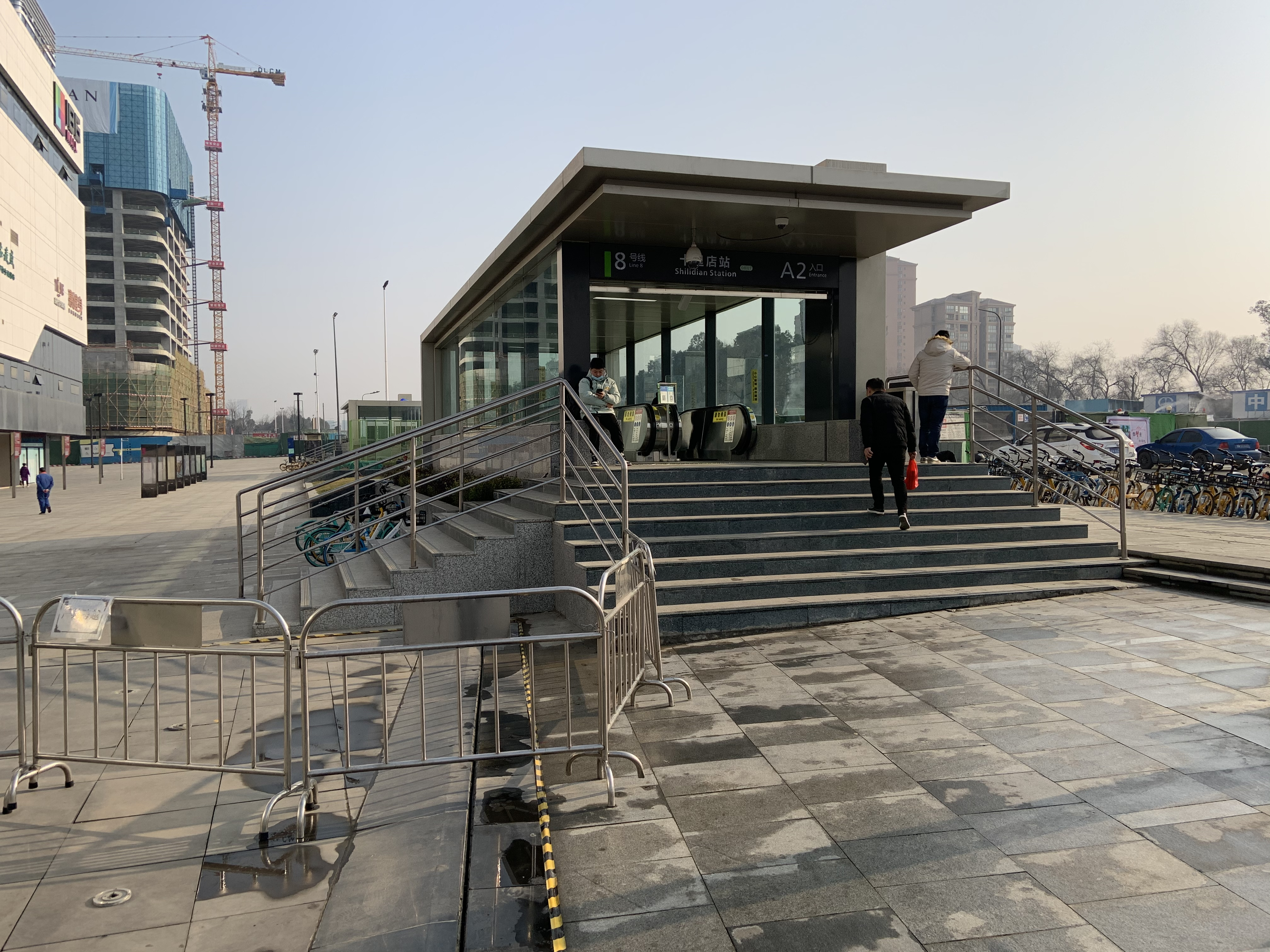
Entrance A2

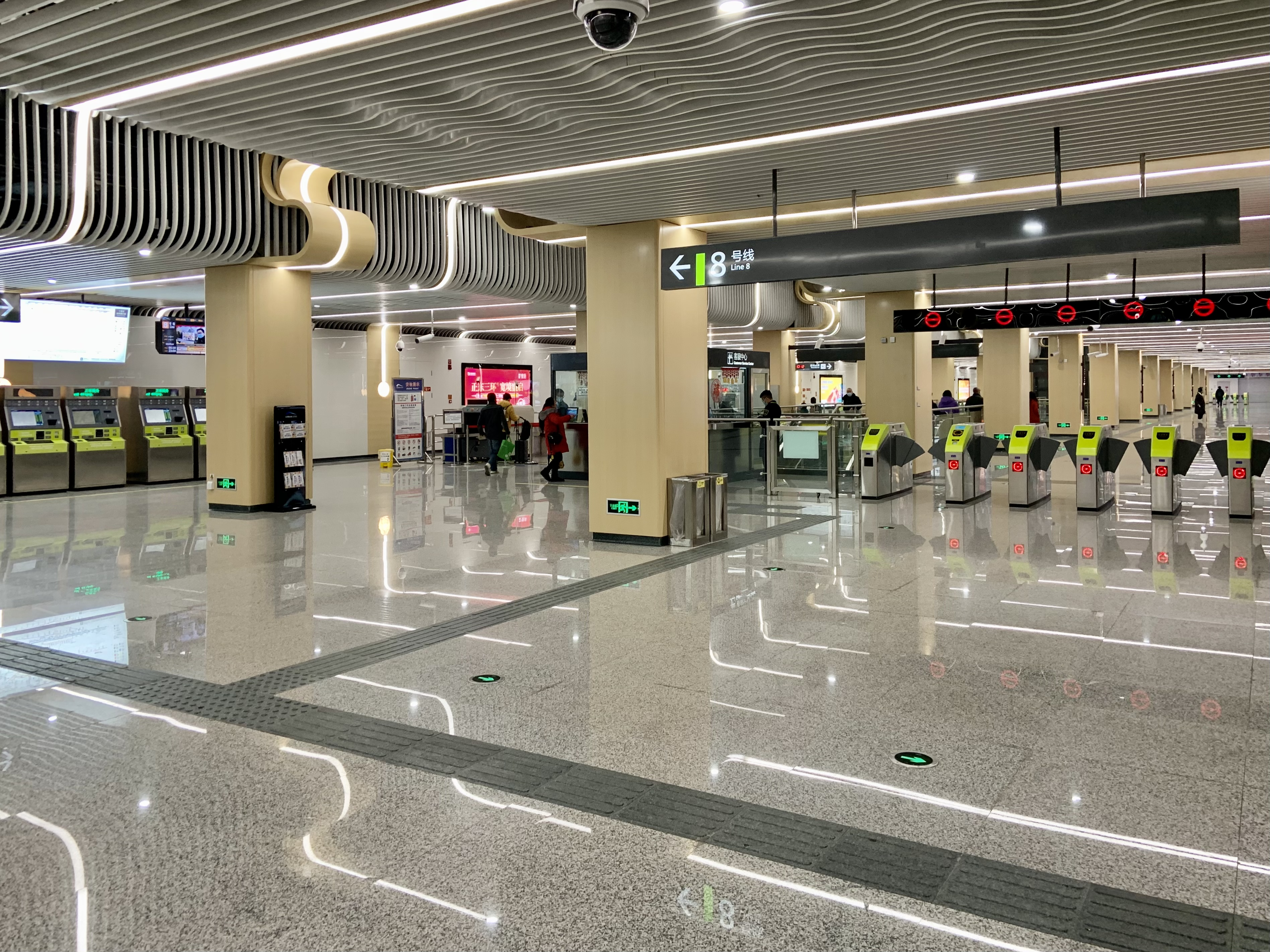
Concourse

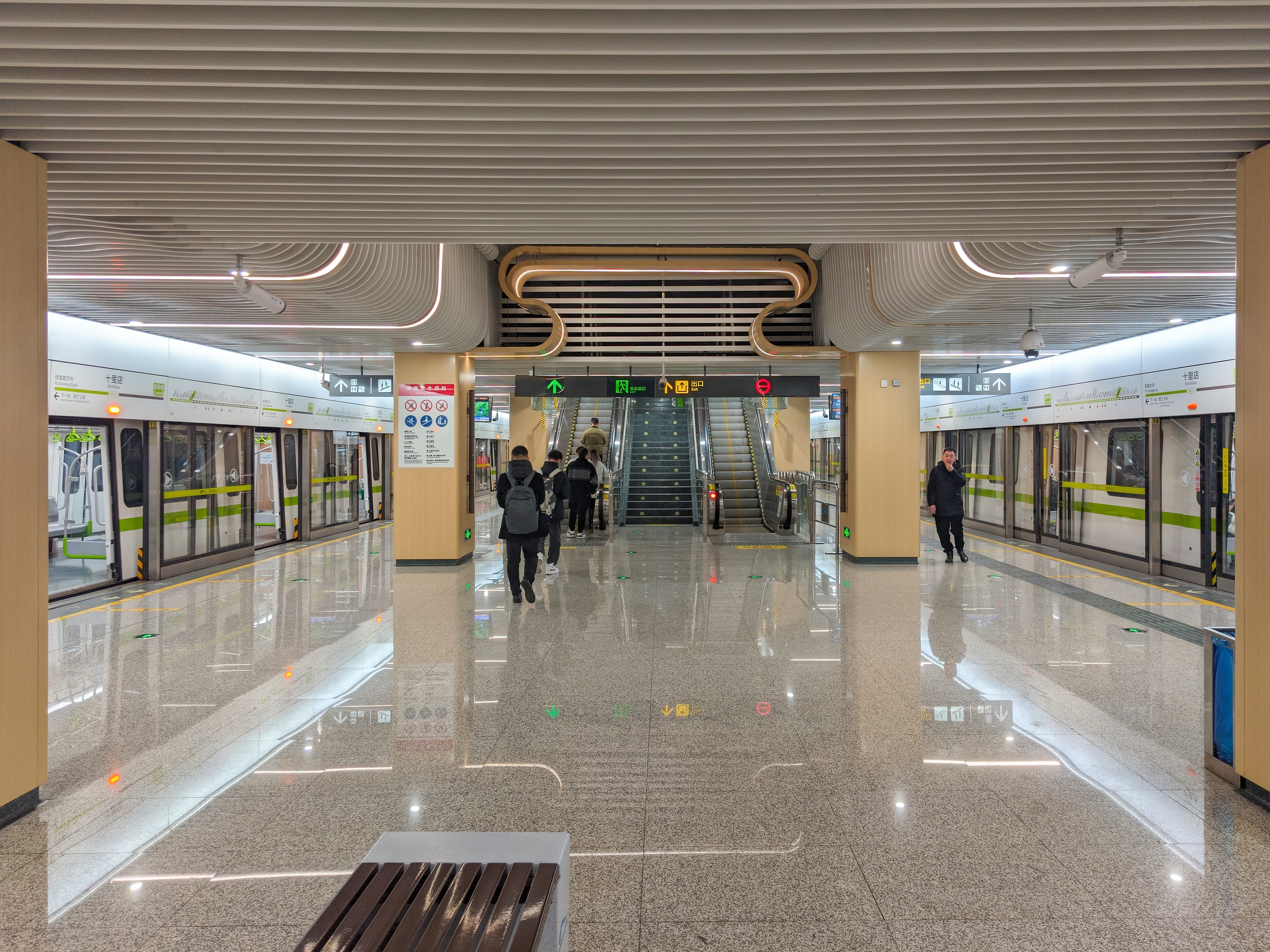
Platform
