= Tongzilin station =

Metro station in China

Tongzilin 桐梓林
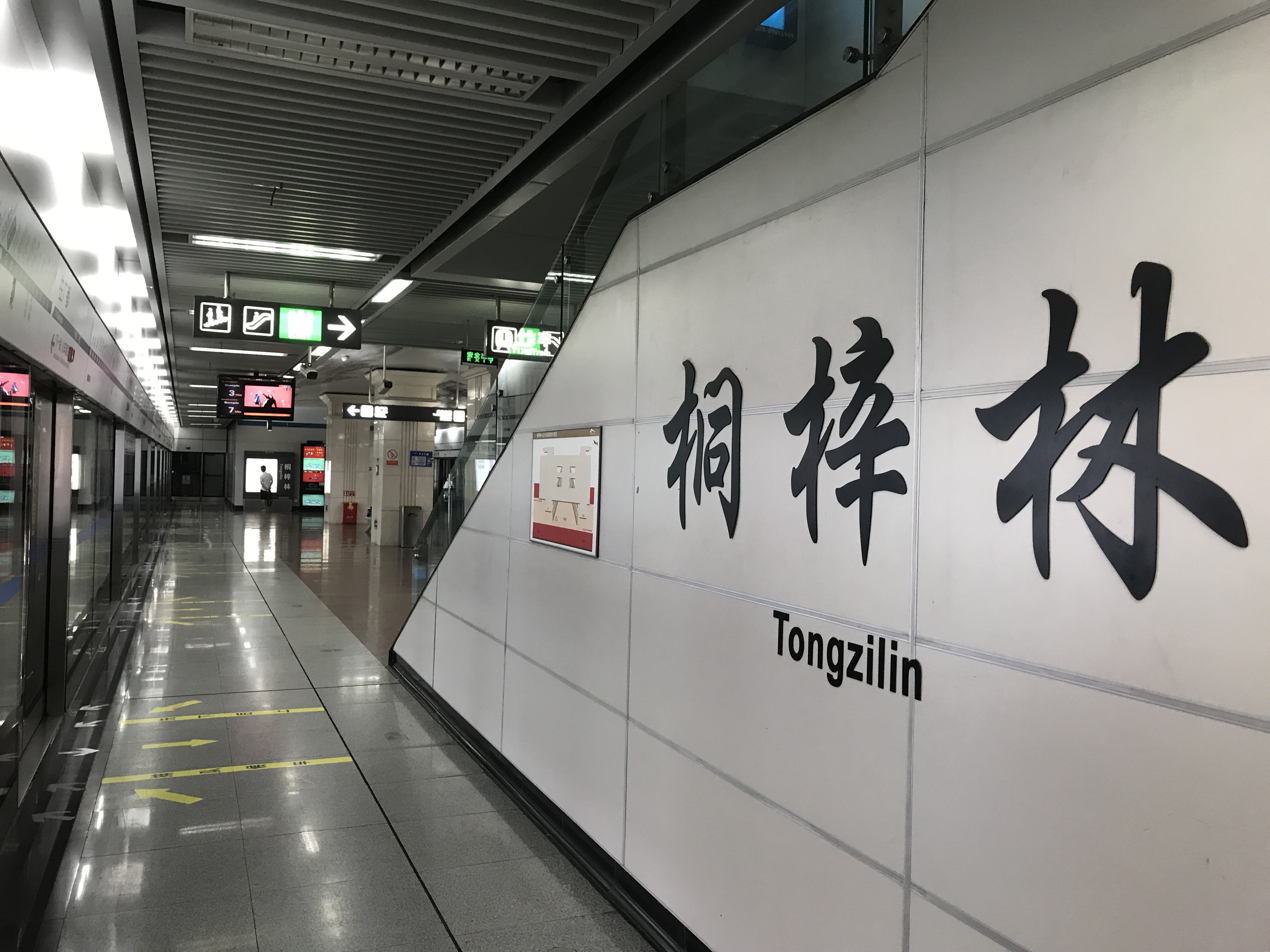

General information
- Location: Wuhou District, Chengdu, Sichuan; China
- Operator: Chengdu Metro Limited
- Line: Line 1
- Platforms: 2 (1 island platform)

Other information
- Station code: 0112

History
- Opened: 27 September 2010

Services
Preceding station	Chengdu Metro	Following station
Nijiaqiao towards Weijianian	Line 1	South Railway Station towards Science City or Wugensong
Location

Tongzilin (Chinese: 桐梓林) is a metro station on Line 1 of the Chengdu Metro in China.

== Station layout ==
G	Entrances and Exits	Exits B, D
B1	Concourse	Faregates, Station Agent
B2	Northbound	← Line 1 towards Weijianian (Nijiaqiao)
B2	Island platform, doors open on the left
B2	Southbound	Line 1 towards Science City (South Railway Station) →

== Gallery ==
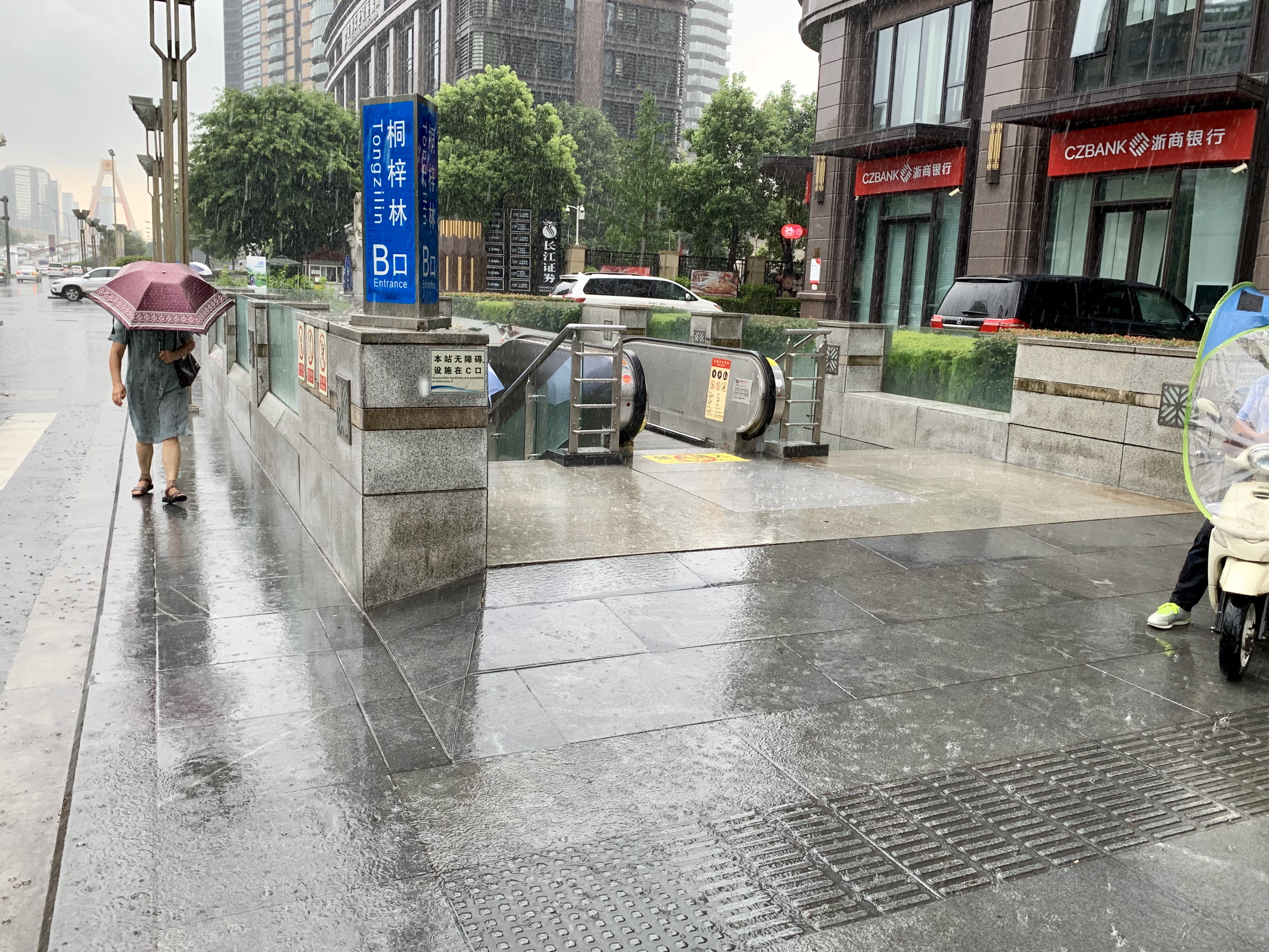
Entrance B

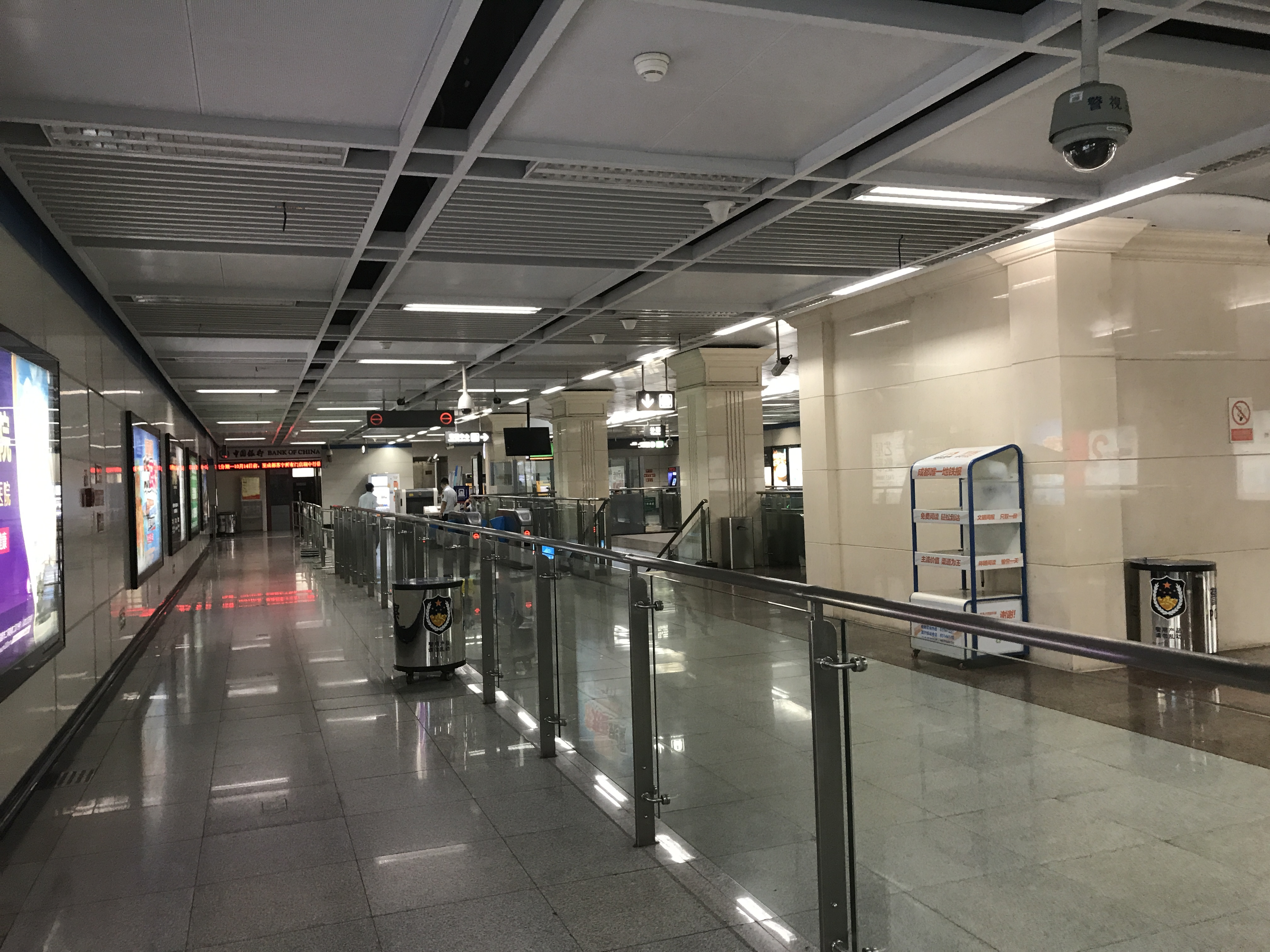
Concourse

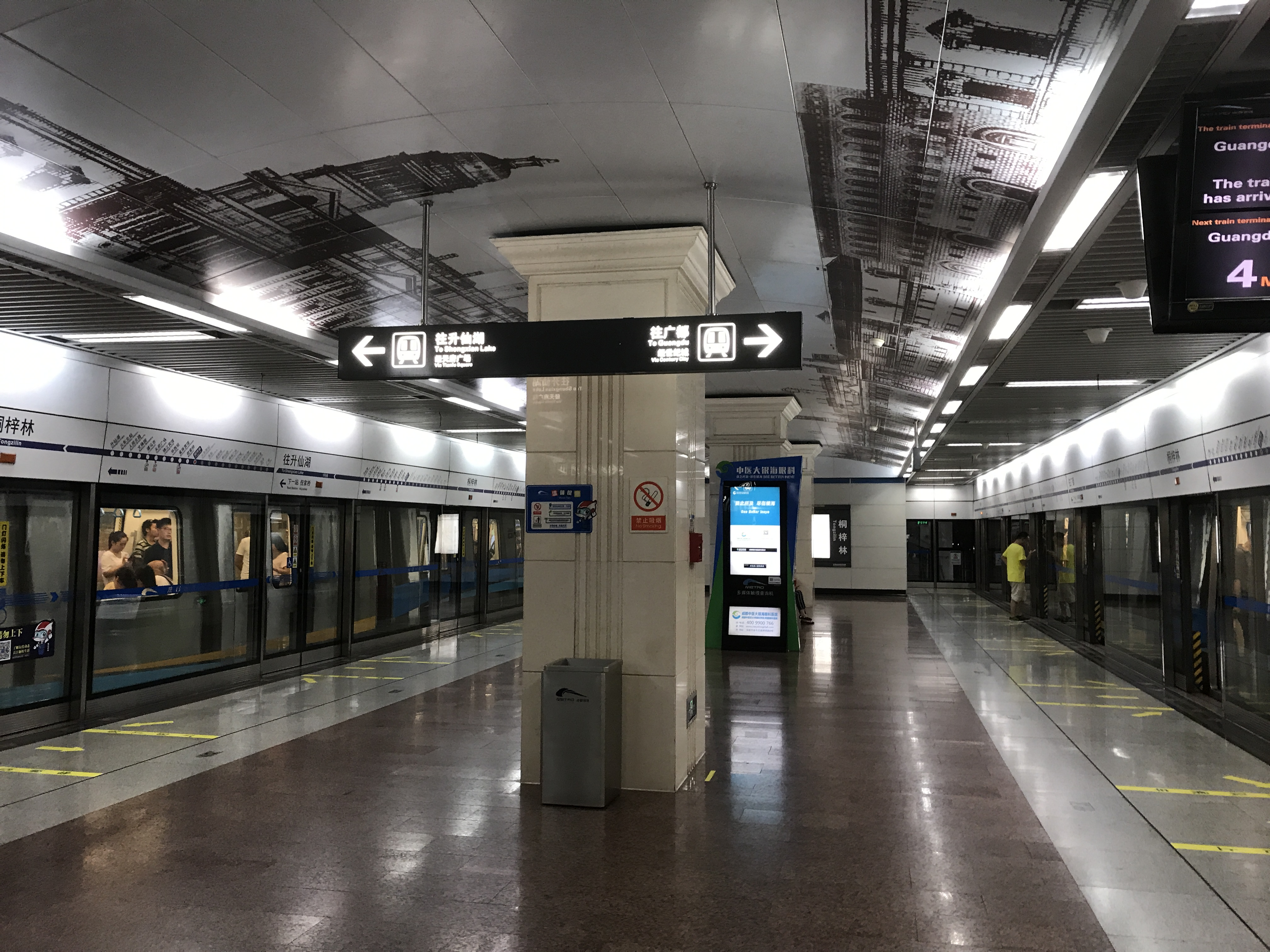
Platform
