= Line 8 (Chengdu Metro) =

Metro line in Chengdu, China

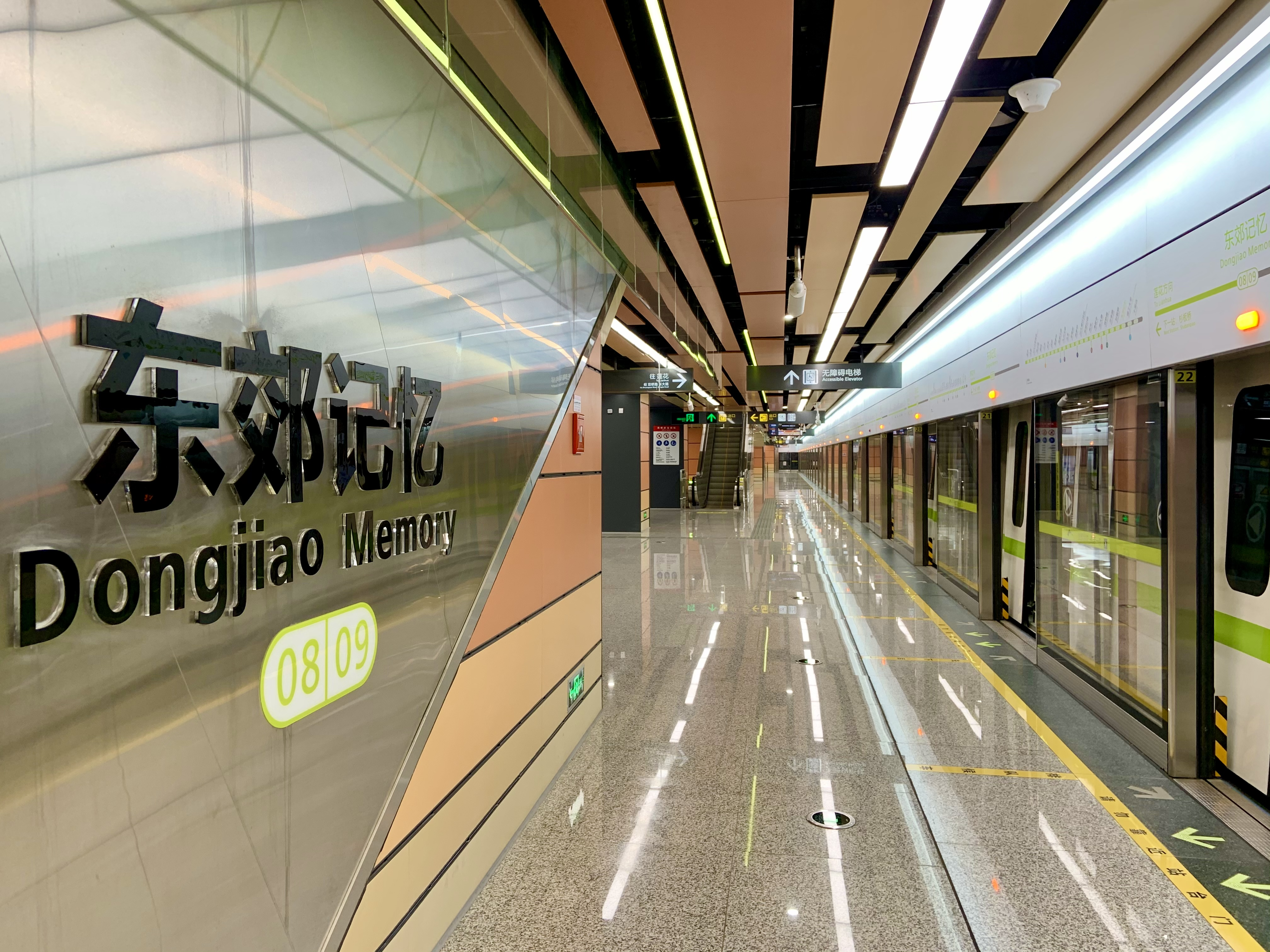
- Line 8 platform at Dongjiao Memory station

Overview
- Status: Operational
- Owner: Chengdu
- Locale: Chengdu, China
- Termini: Guilong Road; Longgang
- Stations: 32

Service
- Type: Rapid transit
- System: Chengdu Metro
- Services: 1
- Operator(s): Chengdu Metro Limited

History
- Opened: 18 December 2020; 5 years ago

Technical
- Line length: 36.71 km (22.81 mi)
- Number of tracks: 2
- Character: Underground
- Track gauge: 1,435 mm (4 ft 8 1/2 in)
- Operating speed: 80 km/h (50 mph)

Line 8 of the Chengdu Metro (Chinese: 成都地铁8号线; pinyin: Chéngdū Dìtiě Bā Hào Xiàn) is a line on the metro network in Chengdu, Sichuan, China. The first phase opened on 18 December 2020.

The line runs from northeast to southwest and avoids the city center of Chengdu. It also connects the Wangjiang and Jiang'an campuses of Sichuan University.

== History ==
- On 11 July 2016, NDRC approved the 3rd phase expansion for the Chengdu Metro, consisting of Line 6 phase 2 and 3, Line 8 Phase 1, Line 9, Line 10 Phase 2, Line 17 Phase 1, and Line 18. The third phase was to be simultaneously built with the already under construction second phase.
- On 11 April 2020, Chengdu Metro reported that track-laying for Line 8 was completed.
- On 8 August 2020, Line 8 's whole line power network passed quality assessment.
- On 18 Dec 2020, Line 8 Phase 1 opened along with: Line 6 Phase 1/2/3, Line 9 Phase 1, Line 17 Phase 1, Line 18 Phase 2, marking the completion of all Phase 2 and 3 projects.
- On 18 May 2020, Line 8 Phase 2, Line 27 Phase 1, Line 30 Phase 1 started construction. This marks the date all 4th Phase projects started construction.
- On 27 March 2023, Line 8 Phase 2 finished Longgang~Lianhua section tunnel work. Line 8 Phase 2 entered railroad construction, electrics, and refurbishment stage.
- On 19 December 2024, Line 8 Phase 2 opened for service.

== Opening timeline ==
Segment	Commencement	Length	Station(s)	Name
Shilidian — Lianhua	18 December 2020	29.1 km (18.08 mi)	25	Phase 1
Guilong Road — Shilidian	19 December 2024		6	Phase 2
Lianhua — Longgang	19 December 2024		1	Phase 2

== Stations ==
Station No.	Station name		Transfer	Distance km		Location
Station No.	English	Chinese	Transfer	Distance km		Location
0801	Guilong Road	桂龙路				Chenghua
0802	Guilin	桂林				Chenghua
0803	Tongle	同乐				Chenghua
0804	Longtan Temple	龙潭寺				Chenghua
0805	Longtan Flyover	龙潭立交				Chenghua
0806	Shengdeng Park	圣灯公园				Chenghua
0807	Shilidian	十里店		--	0.000	Chenghua
0808	Chengdu University of Technology	理工大学	7	0.832	0.832	Chenghua
0809	Dongjiao Memory	东郊记忆		1.041	1.873	Chenghua
0810	Shabanqiao	杉板桥		1.053	2.926	Chenghua
0811	Wannian Road	万年路	Chengdu BRT	1.221	4.147	Chenghua
0812	Shuangqiao Road	双桥路	4 Chengdu BRT	1.004	5.151	Chenghua
0813	Dongdalu Road	东大路	2	1.564	6.715	Jinjiang
0814	Jingjusi	净居寺	13	1.493	8.208	Jinjiang
0815	Dongguang	东光	6	0.762	8.970	Jinjiang
0816	Donghu Park	东湖公园		0.954	9.924	Jinjiang
0817	Sichuan University Wangjiang Campus	川大望江校区		1.416	11.340	Wuhou
0818	Nijiaqiao	倪家桥	1 18	0.964	12.304	Wuhou
0819	Fangcao Street	芳草街		1.248	13.552	Wuhou
0820	Yongfeng	永丰		0.625	14.177	Wuhou
0821	Jiuxing Avenue	九兴大道	5	1.224	15.401	Wuhou
0822	Gaopeng Avenue	高朋大道	7 Chengdu BRT	0.606	16.007	Wuhou
0823	Yinjialin	殷家林		1.288	17.295	Wuhou
0824	Qing'an	庆安		0.841	18.136	Wuhou
0825	Shiyang	石羊		1.513	19.649	Wuhou
0826	Sanyuan	三元	9	0.645	20.294	Wuhou
0827	Shunfeng	顺风		1.605	21.899	Shuangliu
0828	Zhujiang Road	珠江路	30	1.438	23.337	Shuangliu
0829	Sichuan University Jiang'an Campus	川大江安校区		1.569	24.906	Shuangliu
0830	Wenxing	文星		1.697	26.603	Shuangliu
0831	Lianhua	莲花		1.320	27.923	Shuangliu
0832	Longgang	龙港	19			Shuangliu
