= Lianhua station (Chengdu Metro) =

Metro station in Chengdu, China

Lianhua 莲花

General information
- Location: Shuangliu District, Chengdu, Sichuan; China
- Operator: Chengdu Metro Limited
- Line: Line 8
- Platforms: 2 (1 island platform)

Other information
- Station code: 0831

History
- Opened: 18 December 2020

Services
Preceding station	Chengdu Metro	Following station
Wenxing towards Guilong Road	Line 8	Longgang Terminus
Location

Lianhua Station is a metro station at Chengdu, Sichuan, China. It was opened on December 18, 2020 with the opening of Chengdu Metro Line 8.
