= Longgang station (Chengdu Metro) =

Metro station in Chengdu, China

Longgang 龙港
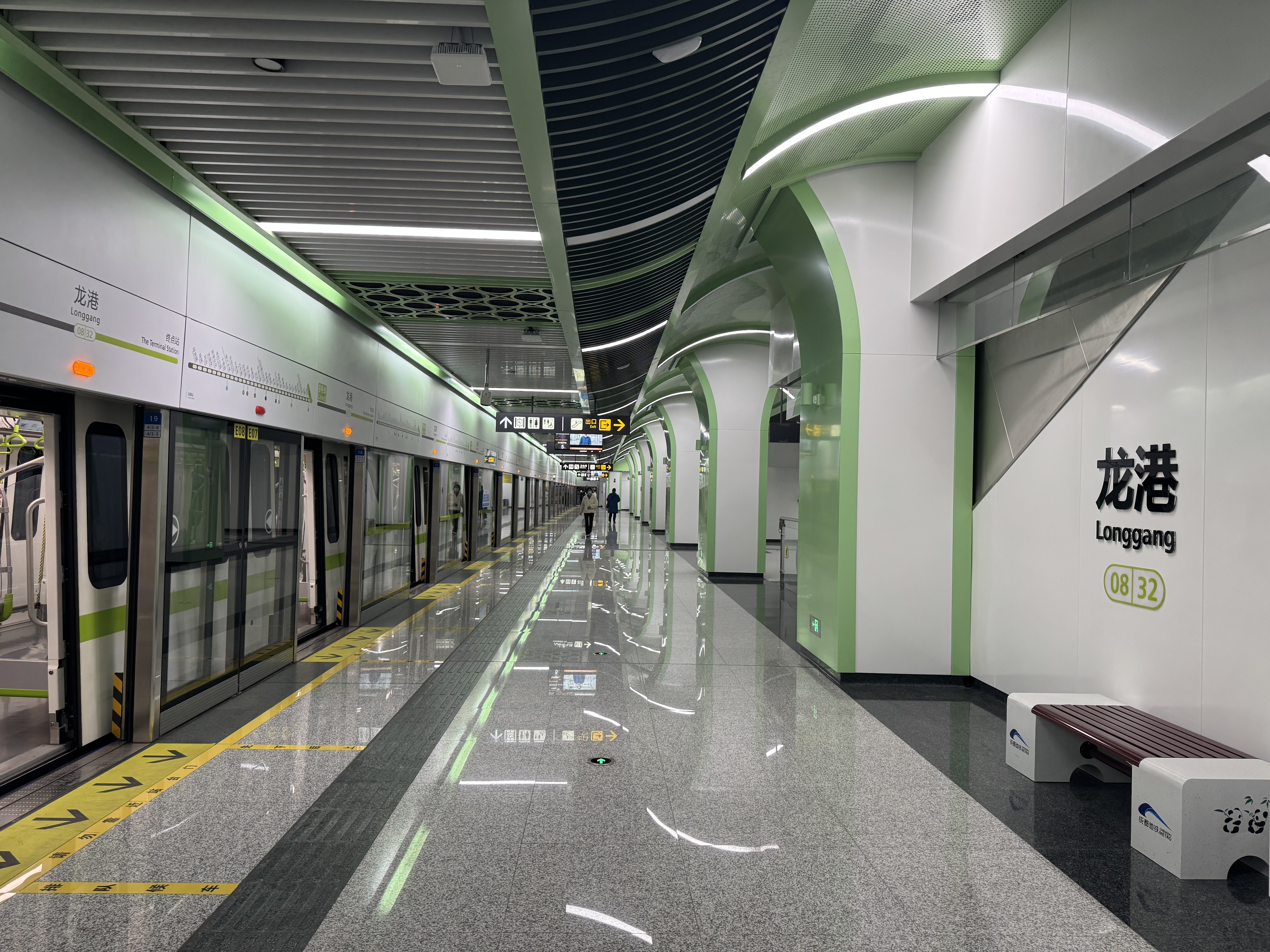
- Line 8 termination platform

General information
- Location: Shuanghua Road × Xihanggang Avenue; Shuangliu District, Chengdu, Sichuan; China
- Coordinates: 30°41′19.90″N 103°59′57.40″E
- System: Chengdu metro station
- Operator: Chengdu Metro Limited
- Lines: Line 8 Line 19
- Platforms: 4 (1 island platform, 2 side platforms)

Other information
- Station code: 0832 1910

History
- Opened: 28 November 2023 (Line 19); 19 December 2024 (Line 8)

Services
Preceding station	Chengdu Metro	Following station
Lianhua towards Guilong Road	Line 8	Terminus
East of Terminal 2 of Shuangliu International Airport towards Jinxing	Line 19	Wenjiashan towards Tianfu Station
Location

Longgang station is a metro station of Line 8 and Line 19 of the Chengdu Metro. It is located at Chengdu, Sichuan, China. The part of Line 19 opened at 28 November 2023, the part of Line 8 opened at 19 December 2024.

== Station layout ==
G	Ground level	Exits
B1	Concourse	Self-Service Tickets, Customer Service Center, Restrooms, Babycare Room
B2		← Line 19 towards Jinxing (East of Terminal 2 of Shuangliu International Airport)
B2	Island Platform, doors will open on the left
B2		Line 19 towards Tianfu International Airport North (Wenjiashan) →
B3
B3	Side Platform, doors will open on the right
B3		← Line 8 termination platform
B3		Line 8 towards Guilong Road (Lianhua) →
B3	Side Platform, doors will open on the right
