= Line 7 (Chengdu Metro) =

Loop line of the Chengdu Metro

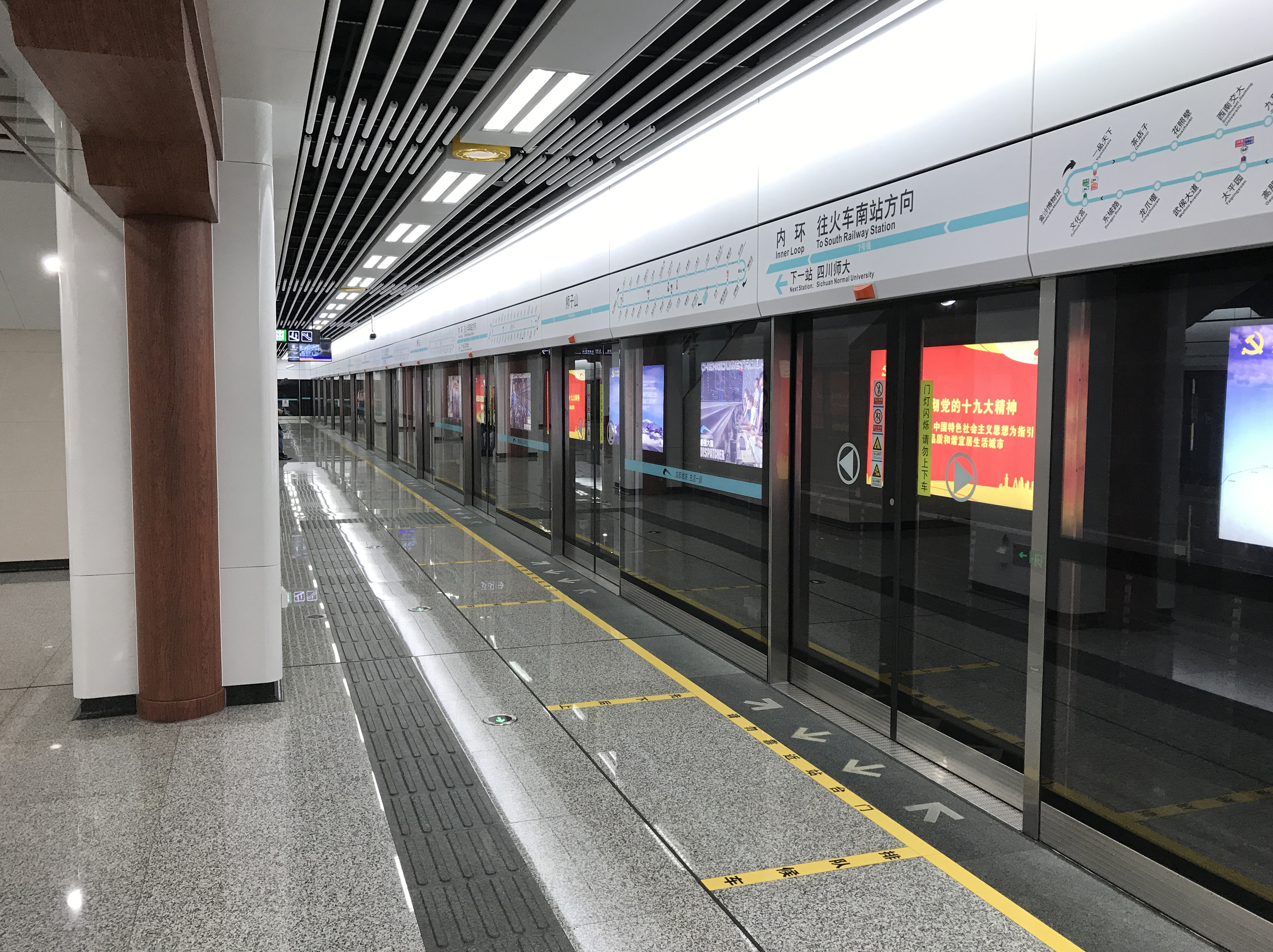
- Platform of Shizishan

Overview
- Status: Operational
- Owner: City of Chengdu
- Locale: Chengdu, Sichuan
- Termini: Loop line
- Stations: 31

Service
- Type: Rapid transit
- System: Chengdu Metro
- Services: 1
- Operator(s): Chengdu Metro Corporation
- Depot(s): Cuijiadian
- Rolling stock: Chuanshi
- Daily ridership: 759,500 (2018 Peak)

History
- Opened: 6 December 2017; 8 years ago

Technical
- Line length: 38.63 km (24.00 mi)
- Number of tracks: 2
- Character: Underground only
- Track gauge: 1,435 mm (4 ft 8 1/2 in)
- Electrification: Overhead lines, 1,500 V DC
- Operating speed: 80 km/h (50 mph)

Line 7 is a loop line of the Chengdu Metro (Chinese: 成都地铁7号线; pinyin: Chéngdū Dìtiě Qī Hào Xiàn). It loops between North railway station, Chengdu University of Technology, Huaishudian, Chengdu East railway station, Sichuan Normal University, Chengdu South railway station, Taipingyuan, Jinsha Site Museum, Southwest Jiaotong University, and City North Coach Terminal Center. The total length is 38.63 km (24.00 mi). Line 7's color is light blue. The construction of Line 7 began in 2013, and ended in late 2017. According to the Chengdu Metro masterplan it will become the inner circle line, with Line 9 being the outer circle line.

== Opening timeline ==
Segment	Commencement	Length	Station(s)	Name
Full loop	6 December 2017	38.63 km (24.00 mi)	31	(initial phase)

== Stations ==
- Listed from the inner Loop

Station №	Station name		Transfer	Distance km		Location
Station №	English	Chinese	Transfer	Distance km		Location
	— ↑ Loop line towards Chengdu University of Technology ↑ —			0.931	0.931	
0726	Cuijiadian	崔家店		0.000	0.000	Chenghua
0725	Shuangdian Road	双店路		1.012	1.012	Chenghua
0724	Huaishudian	槐树店	4	0.855	1.867	Chenghua
0723	Yinghui Road	迎晖路		1.523	3.390	Chenghua
0722	Chengdu East Railway Station	成都东客站	2 CDD	1.090	4.480	Chenghua
0721	Daguan	大观		1.237	5.717	Chenghua
0720	Shizishan	狮子山		1.125	6.842	Jinjiang
0719	Sichuan Normal University	四川师大	13	1.144	7.986	Jinjiang
0718	Liulichang	琉璃场	6	1.553	9.539	Jinjiang
0717	Sanwayao	三瓦窑		2.419	11.958	Jinjiang/Wuhou
0716	South Railway Station	火车南站	1 18 CDN	1.018	12.976	Wuhou
0715	Shenxianshu	神仙树	5 Chengdu BRT	1.944	14.920	Wuhou
0714	Gaopeng Avenue	高朋大道	8	1.784	16.704	Wuhou
0713	Taipingyuan	太平园	3 10	1.443	18.147	Wuhou
0712	Wuhou Avenue	武侯大道		1.467	19.614	Wuhou
0711	Longzhuayan	龙爪堰	17	1.672	21.286	Wuhou
0710	Dongpo Road	东坡路	13	1.061	22.347	Qingyang
0709	Culture Palace	文化宫	4 Chengdu BRT	1.184	23.531	Qingyang
0708	Jinsha Site Museum	金沙博物馆		0.759	24.290	Qingyang
0707	Yipintianxia	一品天下	2	1.543	25.843	Jinniu
0706	Chadianzi	茶店子		1.225	27.058	Jinniu
0705	Huazhaobi	花照壁		1.106	28.164	Jinniu
0704	Southwest Jiaotong University	西南交大	6	0.853	29.017	Jinniu
0703	Jiulidi	九里堤	Chengdu BRT	0.768	29.785	Jinniu
0702	2nd Beizhan West Road	北站西二路	5 Chengdu BRT	0.879	30.664	Jinniu
0701	North Railway Station	火车北站	1 18 CG Chengdu BRT CDU	0.738	31.402	Jinniu
0731	Sima Bridge	驷马桥	3	1.965	33.367	Jinniu/Chenghua
0730	Fuqing Road	府青路		1.285	34.652	Chenghua
0729	Balizhuang	八里庄		1.308	35.960	Chenghua
0728	Erxianqiao	二仙桥	17	1.050	37.010	Chenghua
0727	Chengdu University of Technology	理工大学	8	1.188	38.198	Chenghua
	— ↓ Loop line towards Cuijiadian ↓ —			0.931	39.129	

== See also ==
- Urban rail transit in China
