= Erxianqiao station =

Chengdu Metro station

Coordinates: 30.6831°N 104.1238°E

Erxianqiao 二仙桥
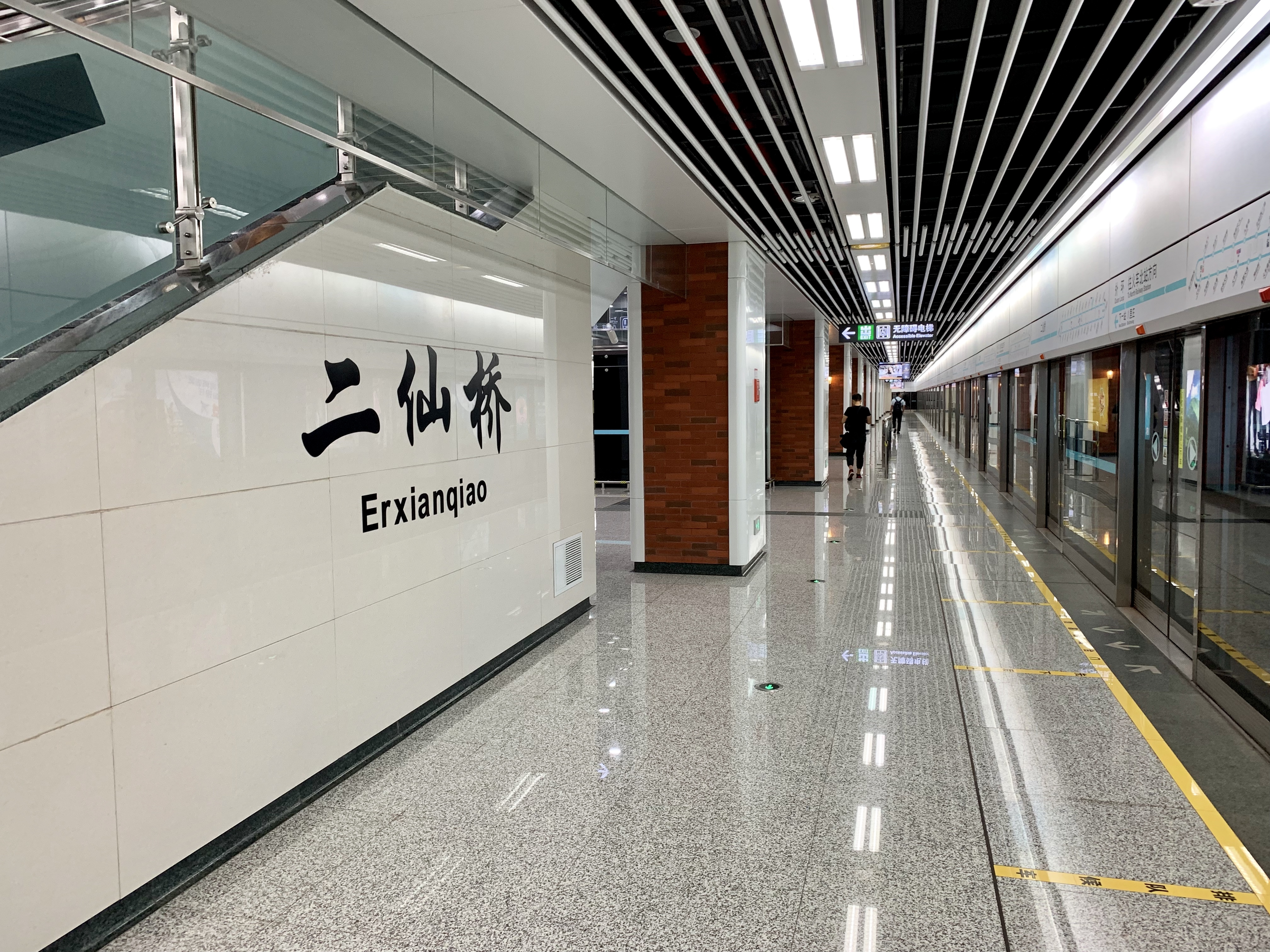

General information
- Location: Chenghua District, Chengdu, Sichuan; China
- Operator: Chengdu Metro Limited
- Lines: Line 7 Line 17
- Platforms: 4 (2 island platforms)

Other information
- Station code: 0728 1706

History
- Opened: 6 December 2017 (Line 7); 17 September 2025 (Line 17)

Services
Preceding station	Chengdu Metro	Following station
Chengdu University of Technology Clockwise	Line 7	Balizhuang Anticlockwise
Tashui Bridge towards Jiujiang North	Line 17	Jichechang towards Gaohong
Location

Erxianqiao station (Chinese: 二仙桥站; pinyin: Èrxiānqiáo zhàn) is a metro station on Line 7 and Line 17 of the Chengdu Metro in China. It was opened on 6 December 2017.

== Station layout ==
G	Entrances and Exits	Exits A, C1, C2, D-F
B1	Concourse	Faregates, Station Agent
B2	Clockwise	← Line 7 to Cuijiadian (Chengdu University of Technology)
B2	Island platform, doors open on the left
B2	Counterclockwise	Line 7 to Cuijiadian (Balizhuang) →
B3	Westbound	← Line 17 to Jiujiang North (Tashui Bridge)
B3	Island platform, doors open on the left
B3	Eastbound	Line 17 to Gaohong (Jichechang) →

== Gallery ==
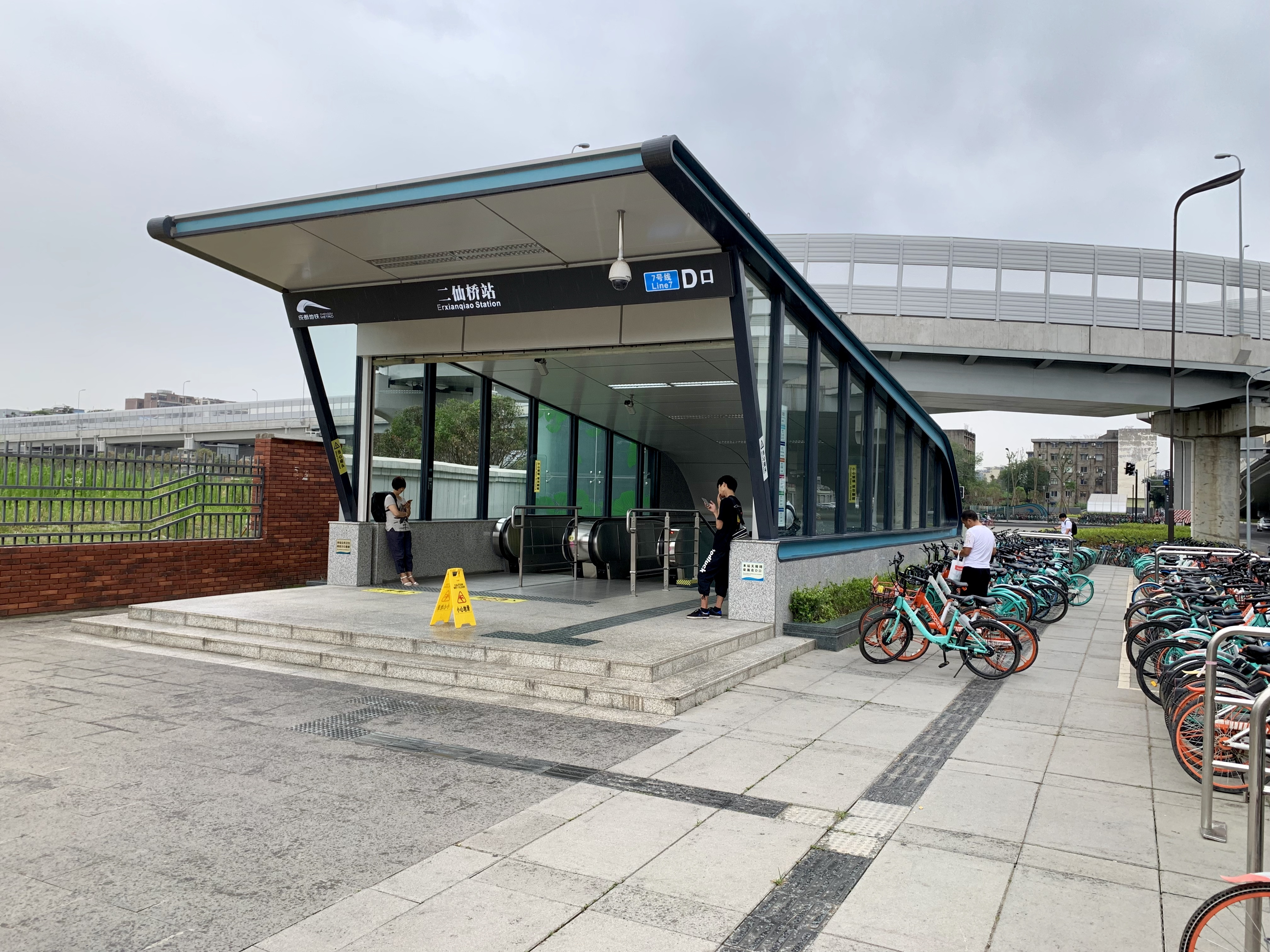
Entrance D

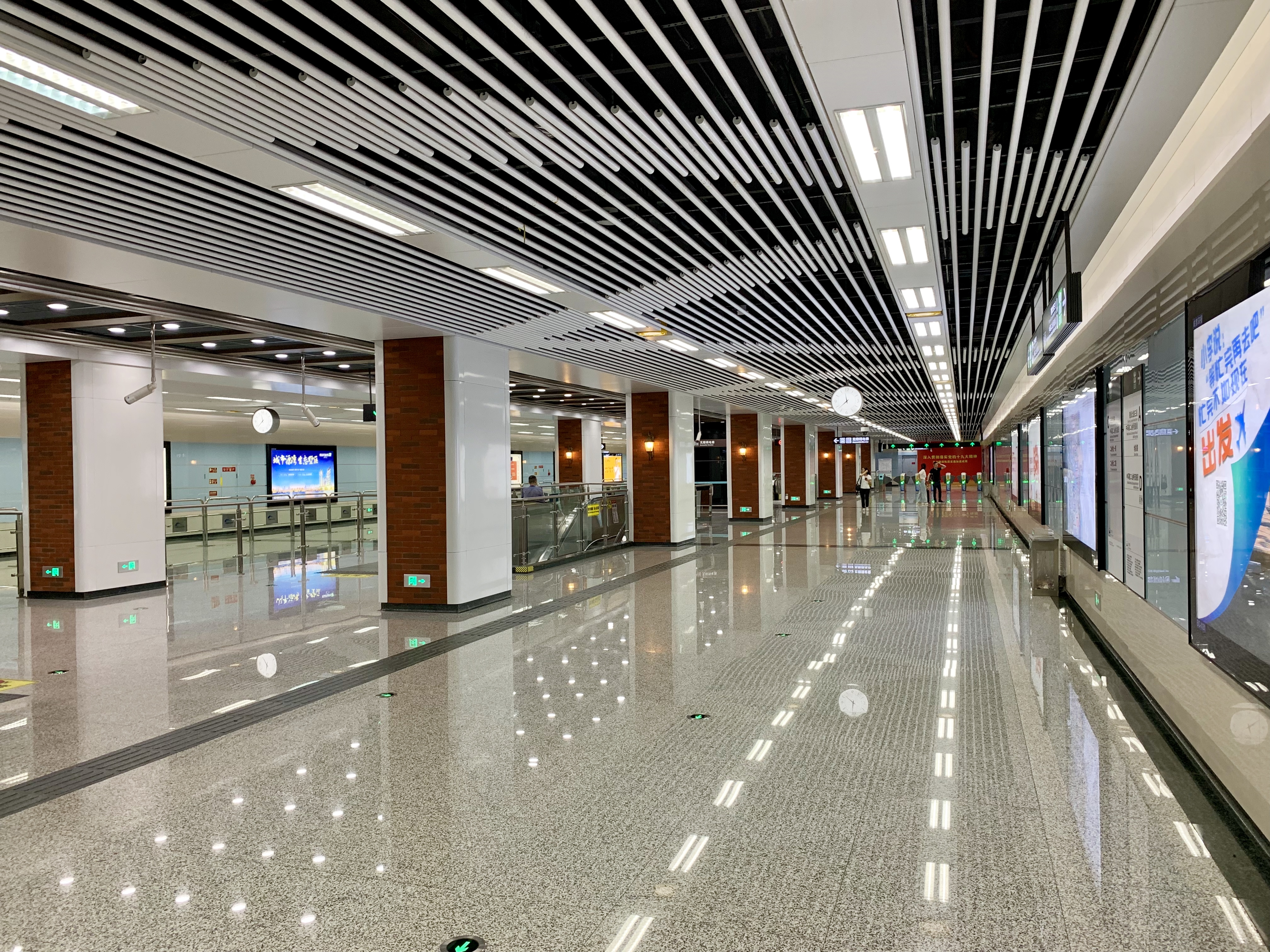
Line 7 Concourse

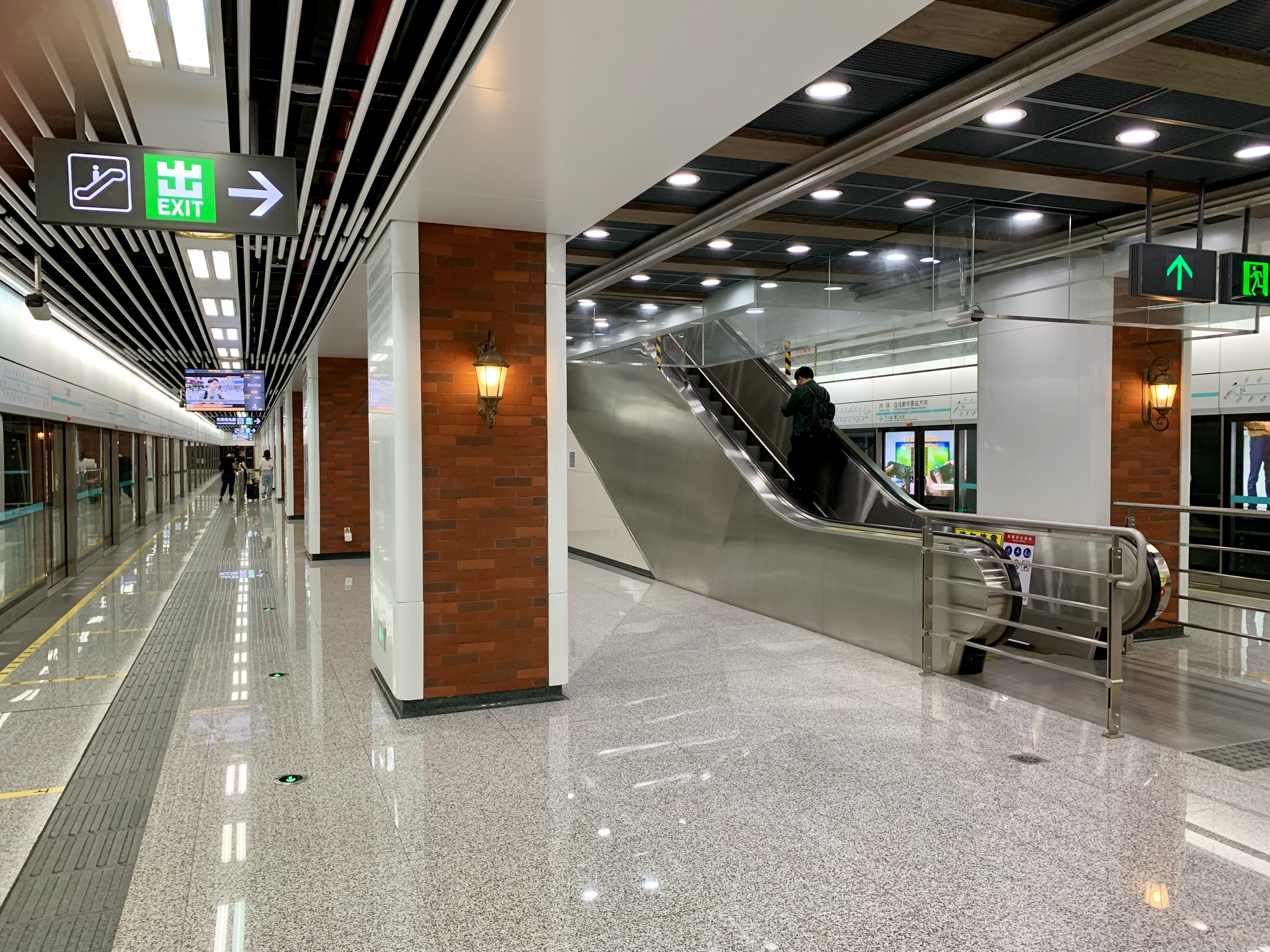
Line 7 Platform
