= Balizhuang station =

Chengdu Metro station

Balizhuang 八里庄
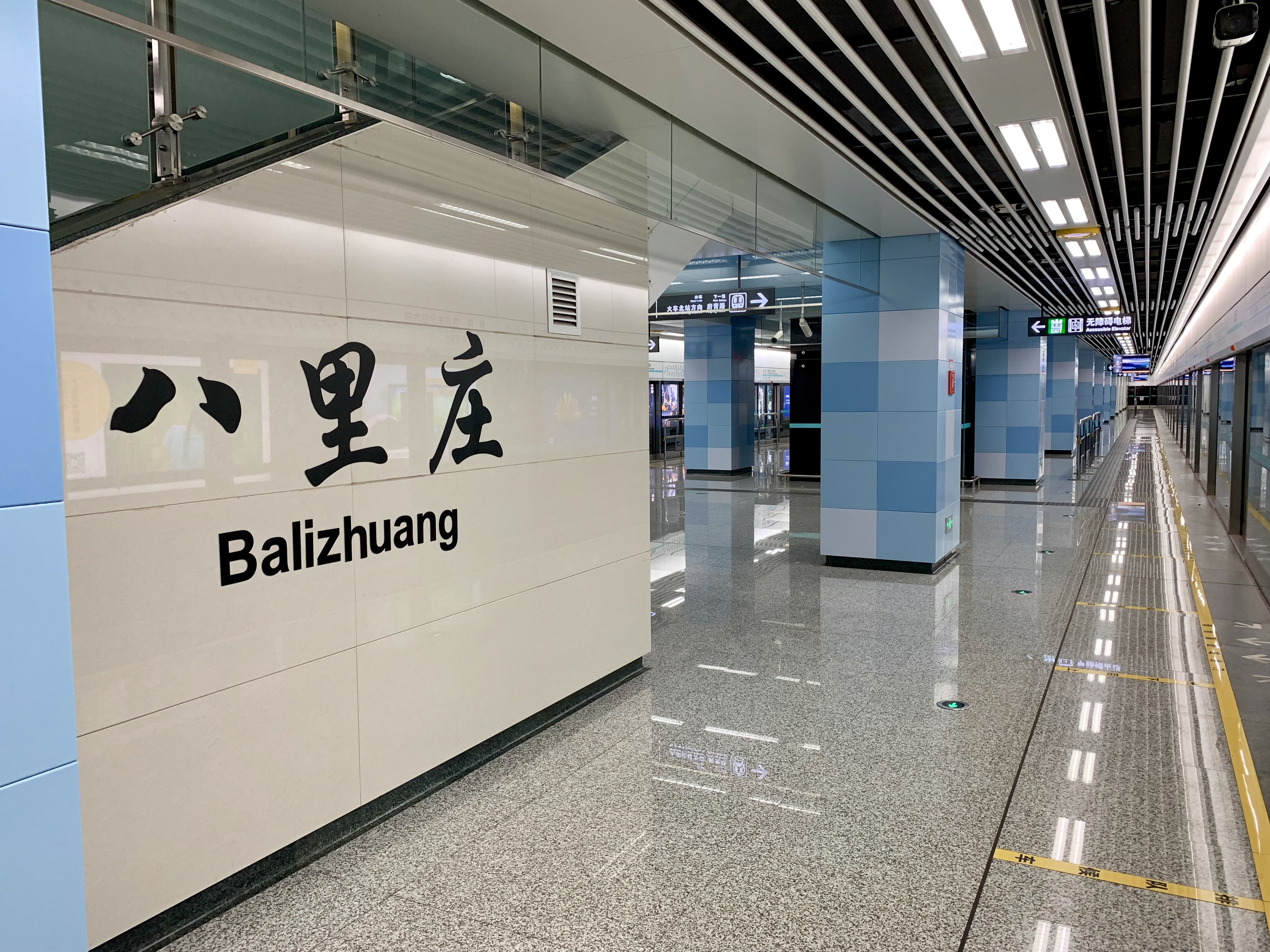

General information
- Location: Chenghua District, Chengdu, Sichuan; China
- Coordinates: 30.6893°N 104.1155°E
- Operator: Chengdu Metro Limited
- Line: Line 7
- Platforms: 2 (1 island platform)

Other information
- Station code: 0729

History
- Opened: 6 December 2017

Services
Preceding station	Chengdu Metro	Following station
Erxianqiao Clockwise	Line 7	Fuqing Road Anticlockwise
Location

Balizhuang (Chinese: 八里庄) is a station on Line 7 of the Chengdu Metro in China. It was opened on 6 December 2017.

== Station layout ==
G	Entrances and Exits	Exits D, F
B1	Concourse	Faregates, Station Agent
B2	Clockwise	← Line 7 to Cuijiadian (Erxianqiao)
B2	Island platform, doors open on the left
B2	Counterclockwise	Line 7 to Cuijiadian (Fuqing Road) →

== Gallery ==
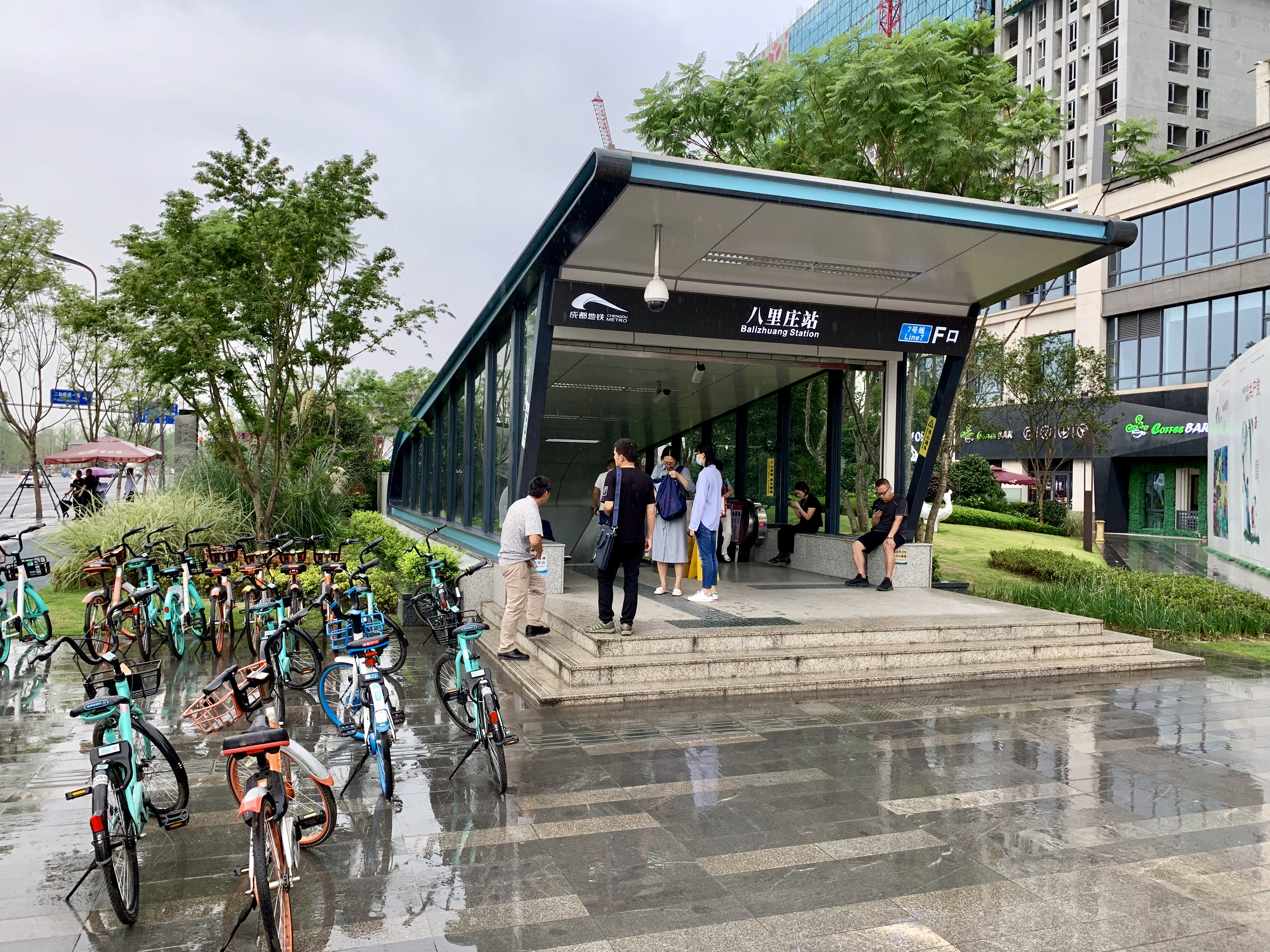
Entrance F

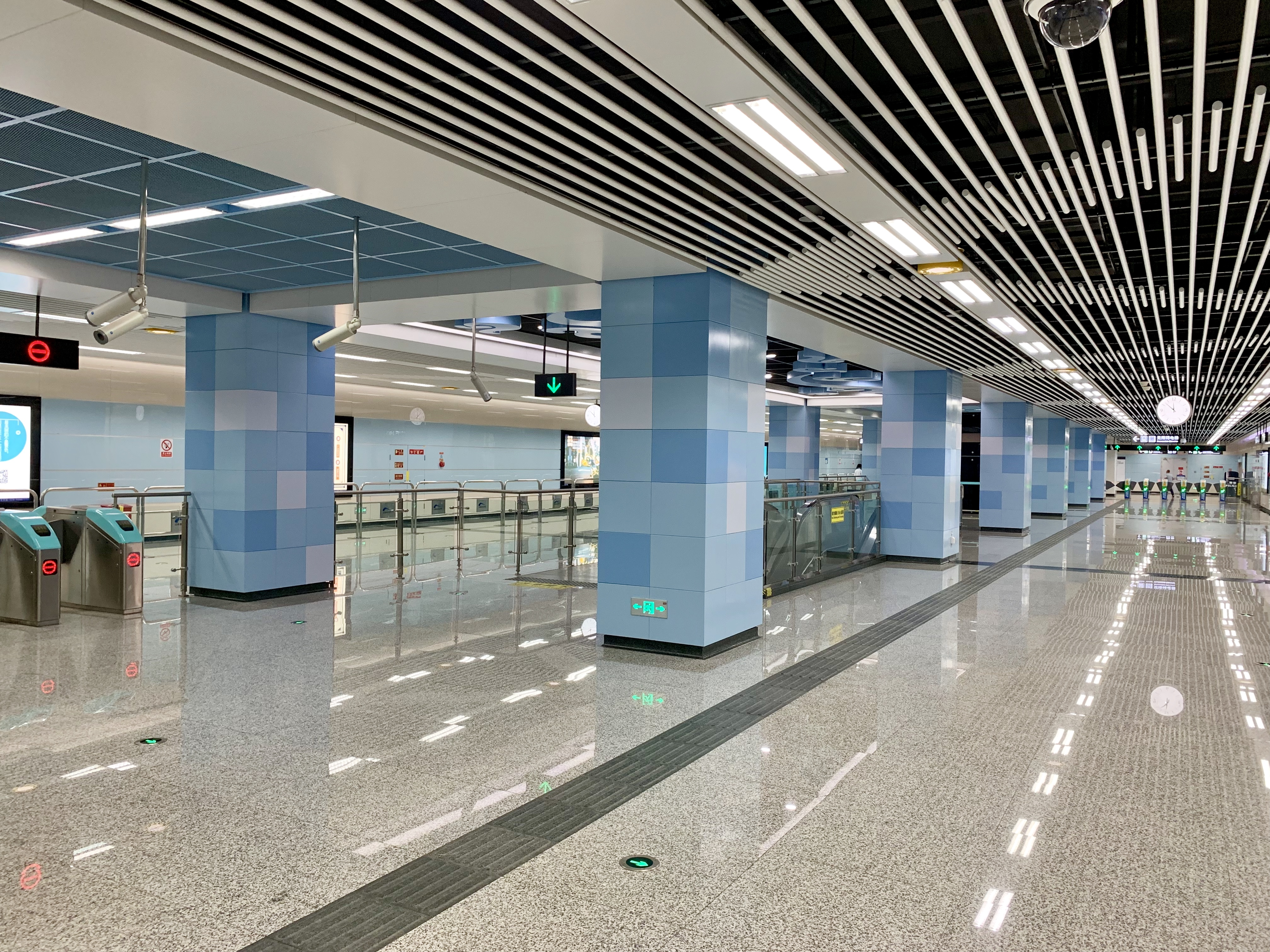
Concourse

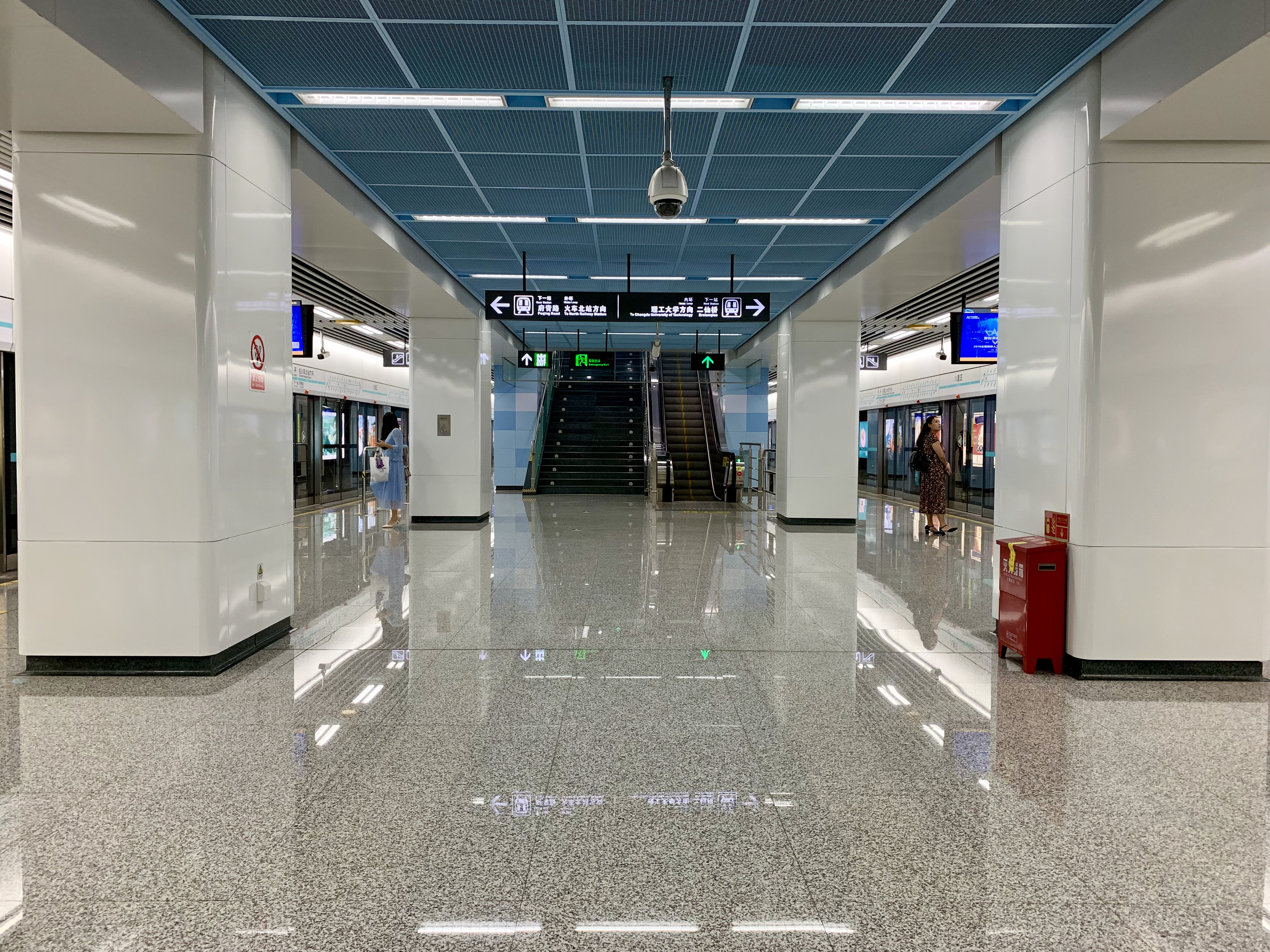
Platform
