= Chengdu Public Transport Group =

Chinese public transport company

Chengdu Public Transport Group Co., Ltd

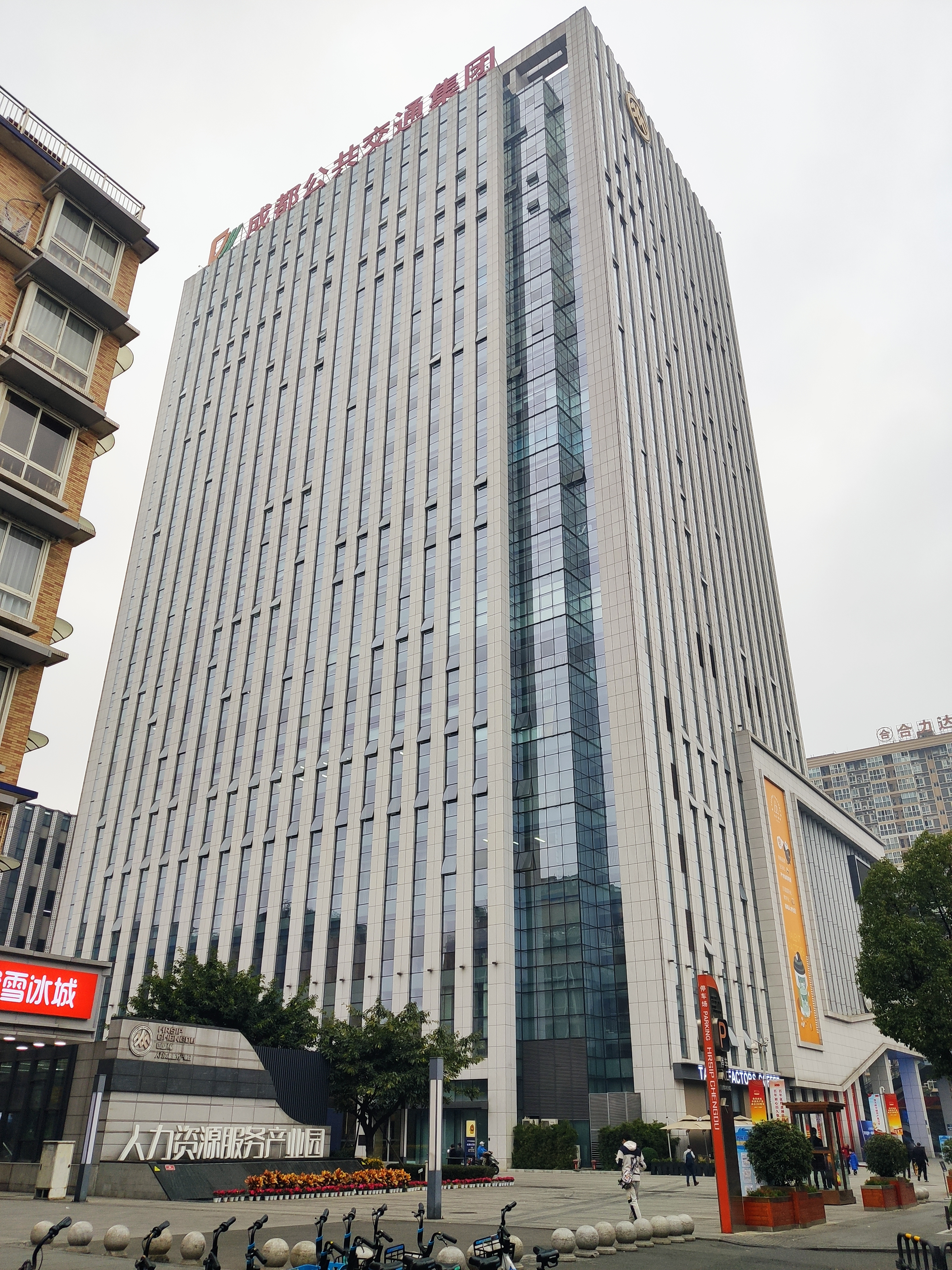
- Headquarters of Chengdu Public Transport Group
- Commenced operation: 1 July 1952; 72 years ago
- Service area: Chengdu
- Service type: Public transport
- Routes: 308 (2012)
- Fleet: Buses: 10,521 (2012); Taxis: 2,850 (2012)
- Website: www.cdgjbus.com

Chengdu Public Transport Group Co., Ltd (Chinese: 成都市公共交通集团有限公司) is a publicly listed majority state-owned public transport company based in the city of Chengdu, China. Founded in July 1952, it was formerly known as Chengdu Bus Company before merging with the Chengdu Tramway Company to become the Chengdu Public Transport Company on 1 May 1983. It was renamed to Chengdu Public Transport Group Corporation on 28 September 1999.

As of the end of December 2012, Chengdu Public Transport Group owned 10,521 buses 2,850 taxis. It operates 294 bus operation lines, 75 bus stations in use (including maintenance yards), and covers an area of 1,650 mu. The average daily passenger capacity of buses is 4.75 million. In 2013, the company's buses traveled 117 million kilometers, a year-on-year increase of 12.31%, and the total passenger traffic was 529 million, a year-on-year increase of 11.80%. Public transportation comprises a 26.1% share of the city's transport.

== Operations ==
Chengdu Public Transport Group provides a wide variety of services including buses, taxis, public bicycles, car repairs, car rentals, bus advertising, property management, and driver training.

== See also ==
- Chengdu BRT
- Chengdu Metro
