= Jinsha Site Museum station =

Chengdu Metro station

Jinsha Site Museum 金沙博物馆
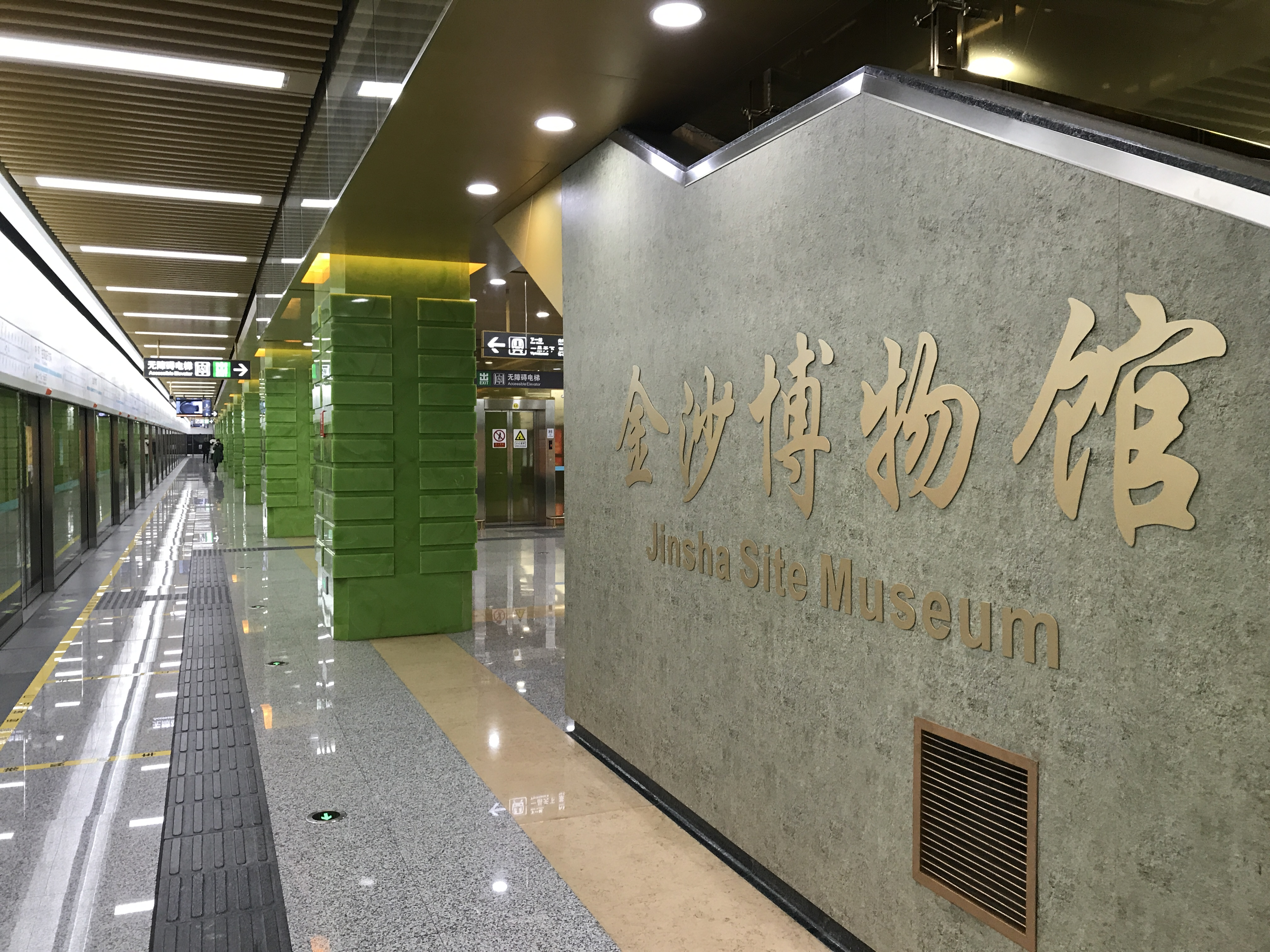

General information
- Location: Qingyang District, Chengdu, Sichuan; China
- Operator: Chengdu Metro Limited
- Line: Line 7
- Platforms: 2 (1 island platform)

Other information
- Station code: 0708

History
- Opened: 6 December 2017

Services
Preceding station	Chengdu Metro	Following station
Yipintianxia Clockwise	Line 7	Culture Palace Anticlockwise
Location

Jinsha Site Museum station (Chinese: 金沙博物馆站; pinyin: Jīnshā Bówùguǎn zhàn) is a station on Line 7 of the Chengdu Metro system in Chengdu, Sichuan, China. It was opened on 6 December 2017. The station serves the nearby Jinsha site and is located at the intersection of Qingyang Avenue and Jinsha Site Road.

== Station layout ==
G	Entrances and Exits	Exits A-D
B1	Concourse	Faregates, Station Agent
B2	Clockwise	← Line 7 to Cuijiadian (Yipintianxia)
B2	Island platform, doors open on the left
B2	Counterclockwise	Line 7 to Cuijiadian (Culture Palace) →

== Gallery ==
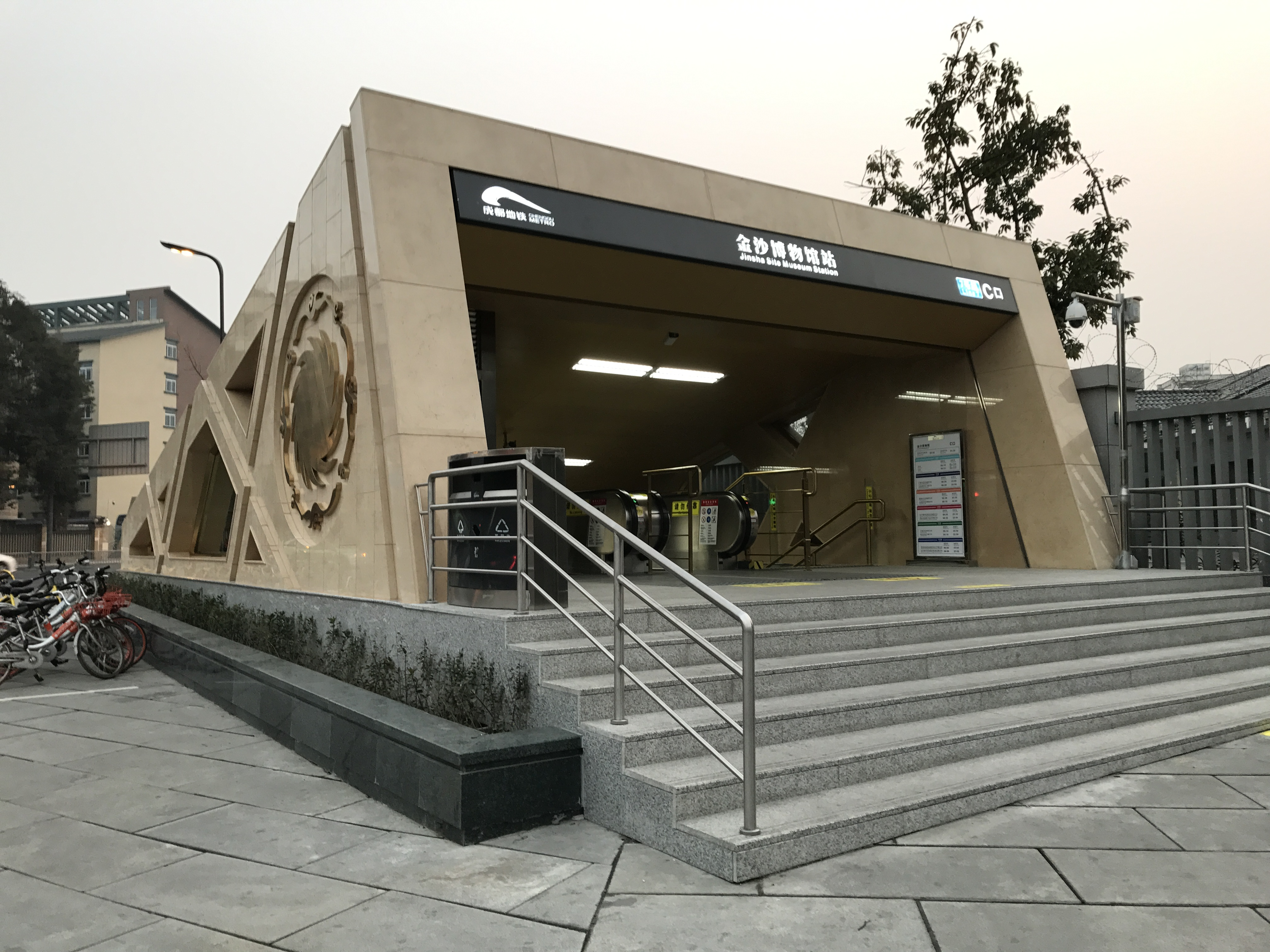
Entrance C

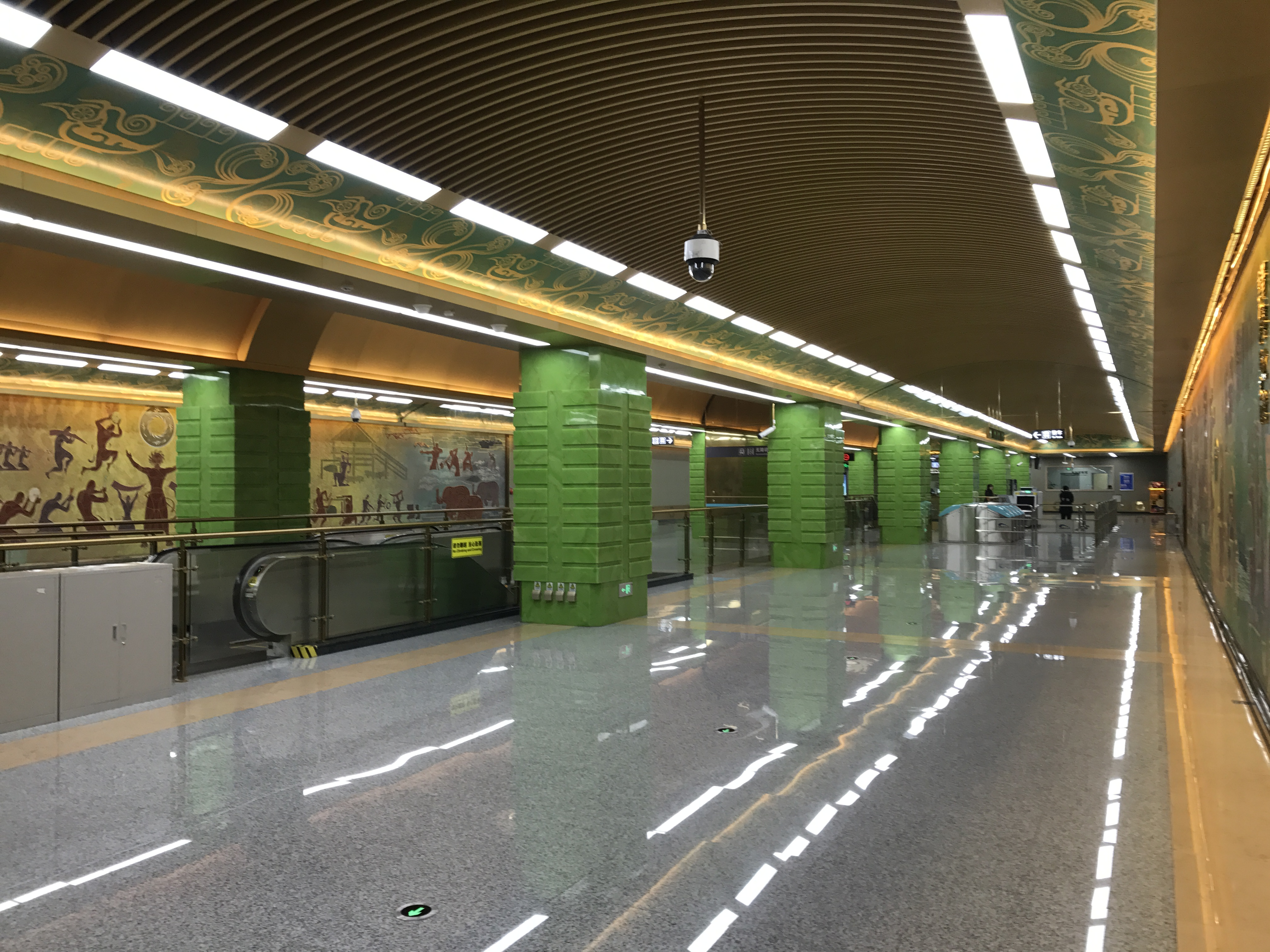
Concourse

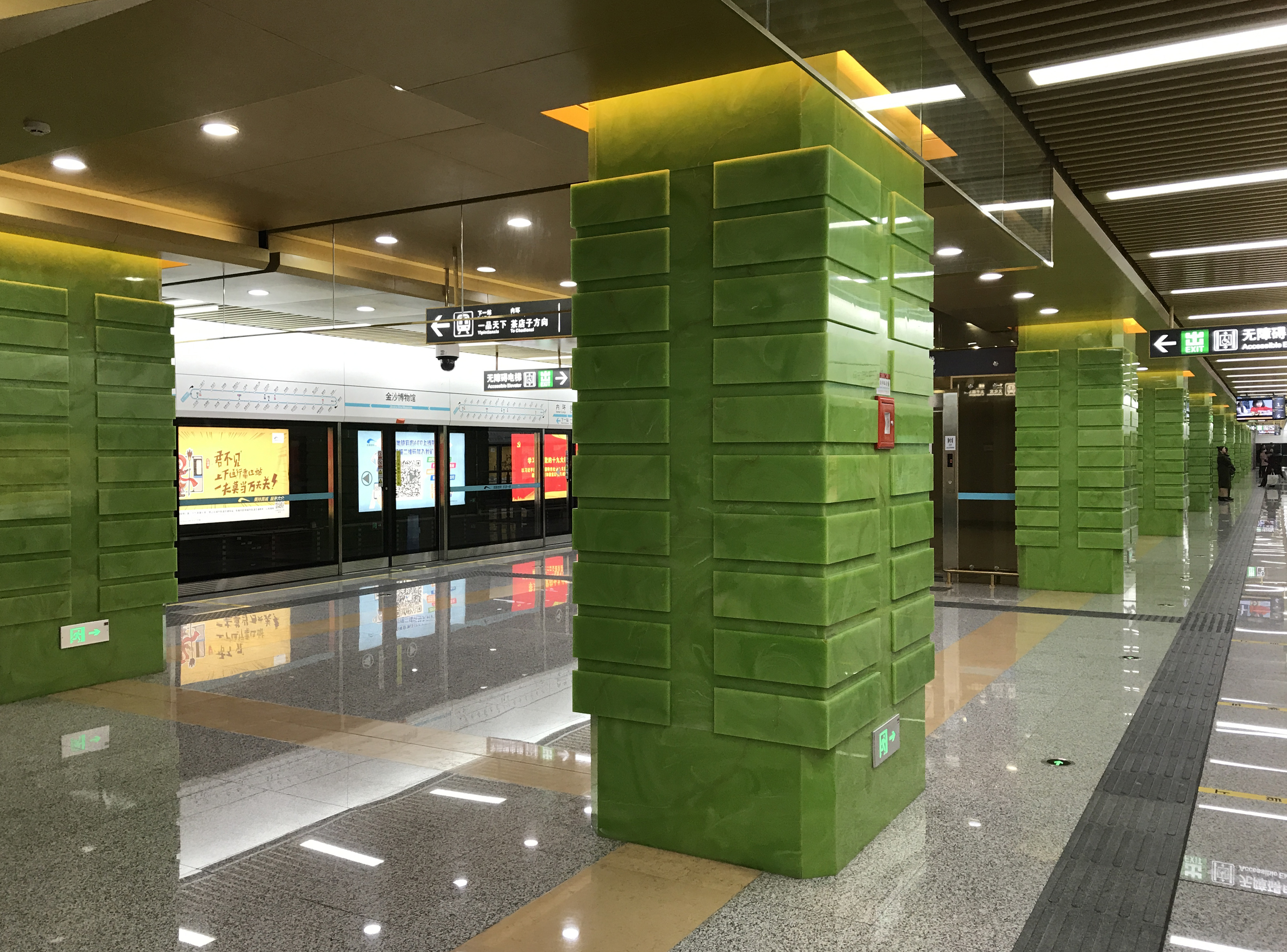
Platform
