= Lijiatuo station =

Metro station in Chengdu, China

Lijiatuo 李家沱

General information
- Location: Chenghua District, Chengdu, Sichuan; China
- Operated by: Chengdu Metro Limited
- Line: Line 3
- Platforms: 2 (1 island platform)

Other information
- Station code: 0315

History
- Opened: 31 July 2016

Services
Preceding station	Chengdu Metro	Following station
Sima Bridge towards Chengdu Medical College	Line 3	Qianfeng Road towards Shuangliu West Railway Station
Location

Lijiatuo (Chinese: 李家沱) is a station on Line 3 of the Chengdu Metro in China.

== Station layout ==
G	Entrances and Exits	Exits B-D
B1	Concourse	Faregates, Station Agent
B2	Northbound	← Line 3 towards Chengdu Medical College (Simaqiao)
B2	Island platform, doors open on the left
B2	Southbound	Line 3 towards Shuangliu West Railway Station (Qianfeng Road) →
