= Sima Bridge station =

Chengdu Metro station (China)

Sima Bridge 驷马桥
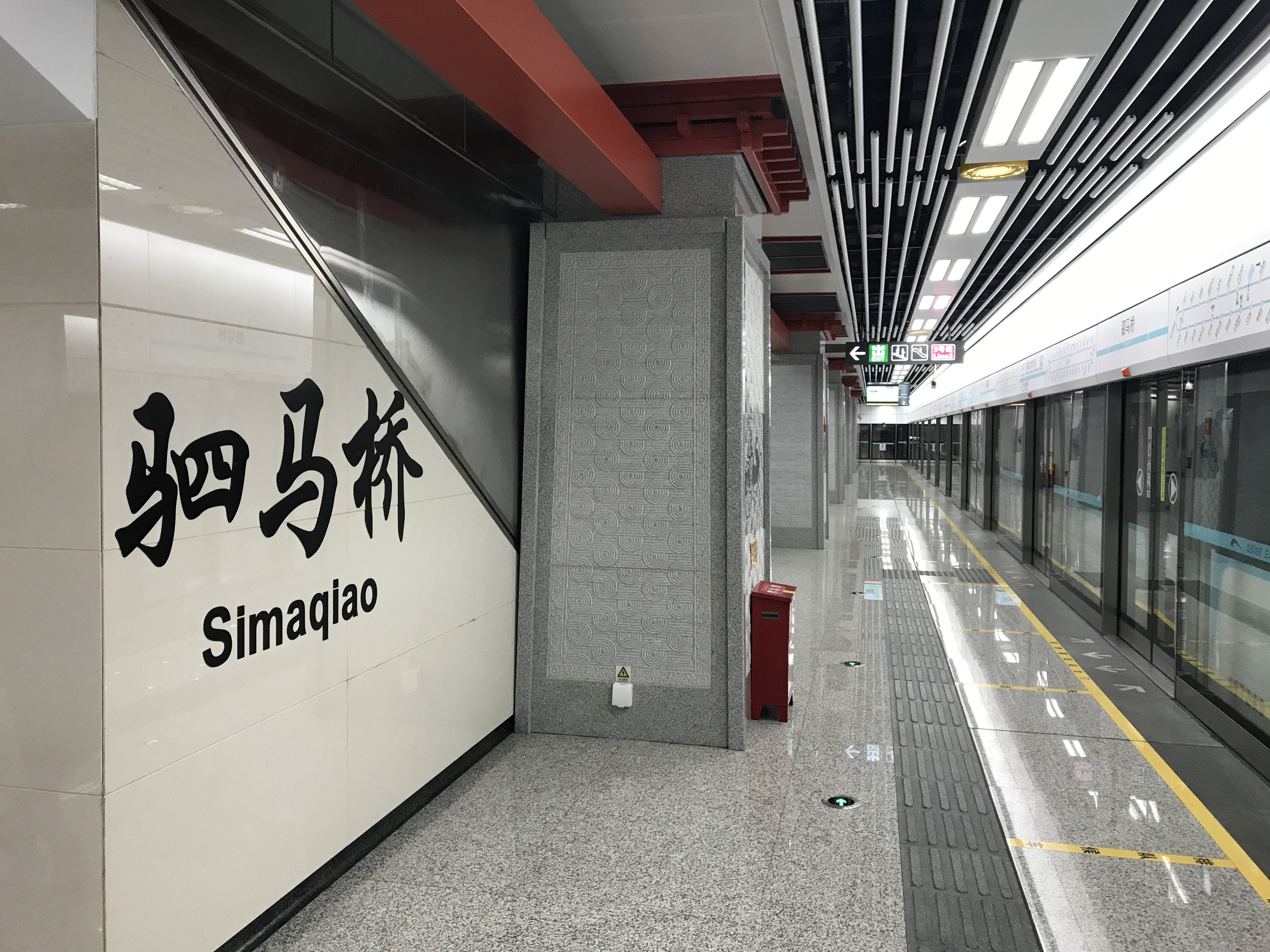

General information
- Location: Chenghua District, Chengdu, Sichuan; China
- Coordinates: 30.6979082°N 104.0908517°E
- Operated by: Chengdu Metro Limited
- Lines: Line 3 Line 7
- Platforms: 4 (2 island platforms)

Other information
- Station code: 0314 0731

History
- Opened: 31 July 2016
- Previous names: Simaqiao

Services
Preceding station	Chengdu Metro	Following station
Zhaojuesi South Road towards Chengdu Medical College	Line 3	Lijiatuo towards Shuangliu West Railway Station
Fuqing Road Clockwise	Line 7	North Railway Station Anticlockwise
Location

Sima Bridge (Chinese: 驷马桥), formerly known as Simaqiao, is a transfer station on Line 3 and Line 7 of the Chengdu Metro in China.

== Station layout ==
G	Entrances and Exits	Exits A-E
B1	Concourse	Faregates, Station Agent
B2	Clockwise	← Line 7 to Fuqing Road
B2	Island platform, doors open on the left
B2	Counterclockwise	Line 7 to North Railway Station →
B3	Northbound	← Line 3 towards Chengdu Medical College (Zhaojuesi South Road)
B3	Island platform, doors open on the left
B3	Southbound	Line 3 towards Shuangliu West Railway Station (Lijiatuo) →

== Gallery ==
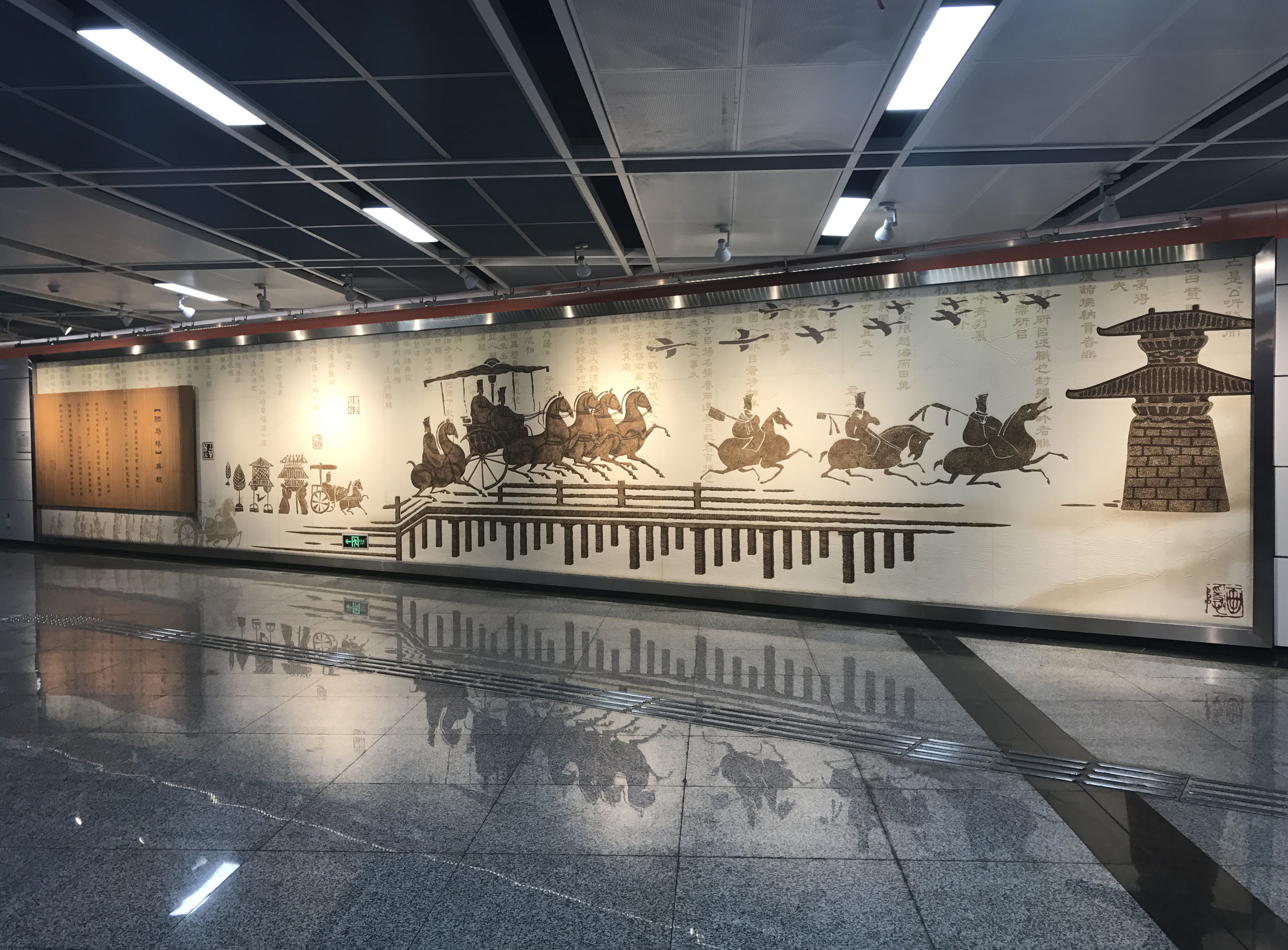
Artwall

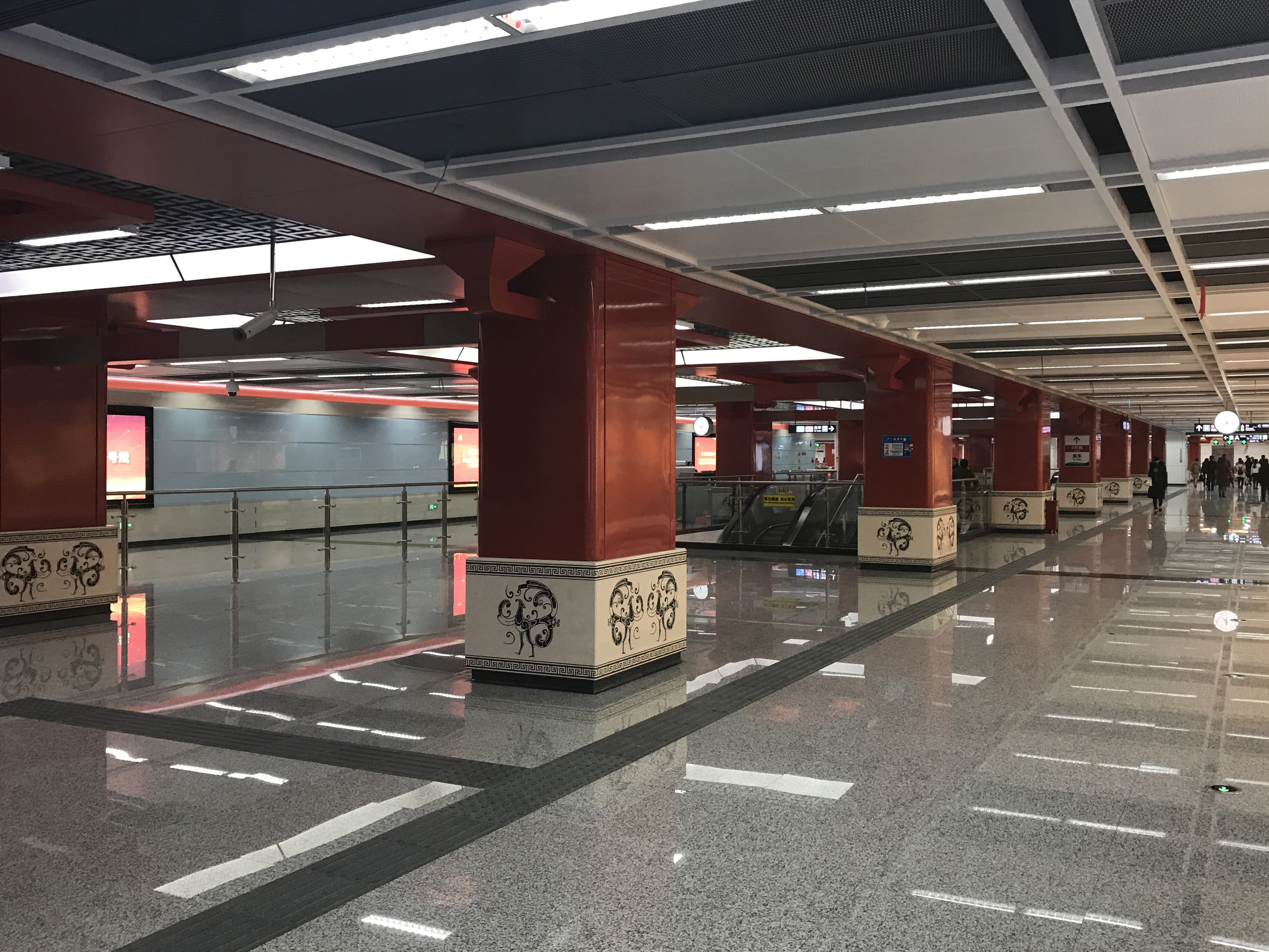
Concourse

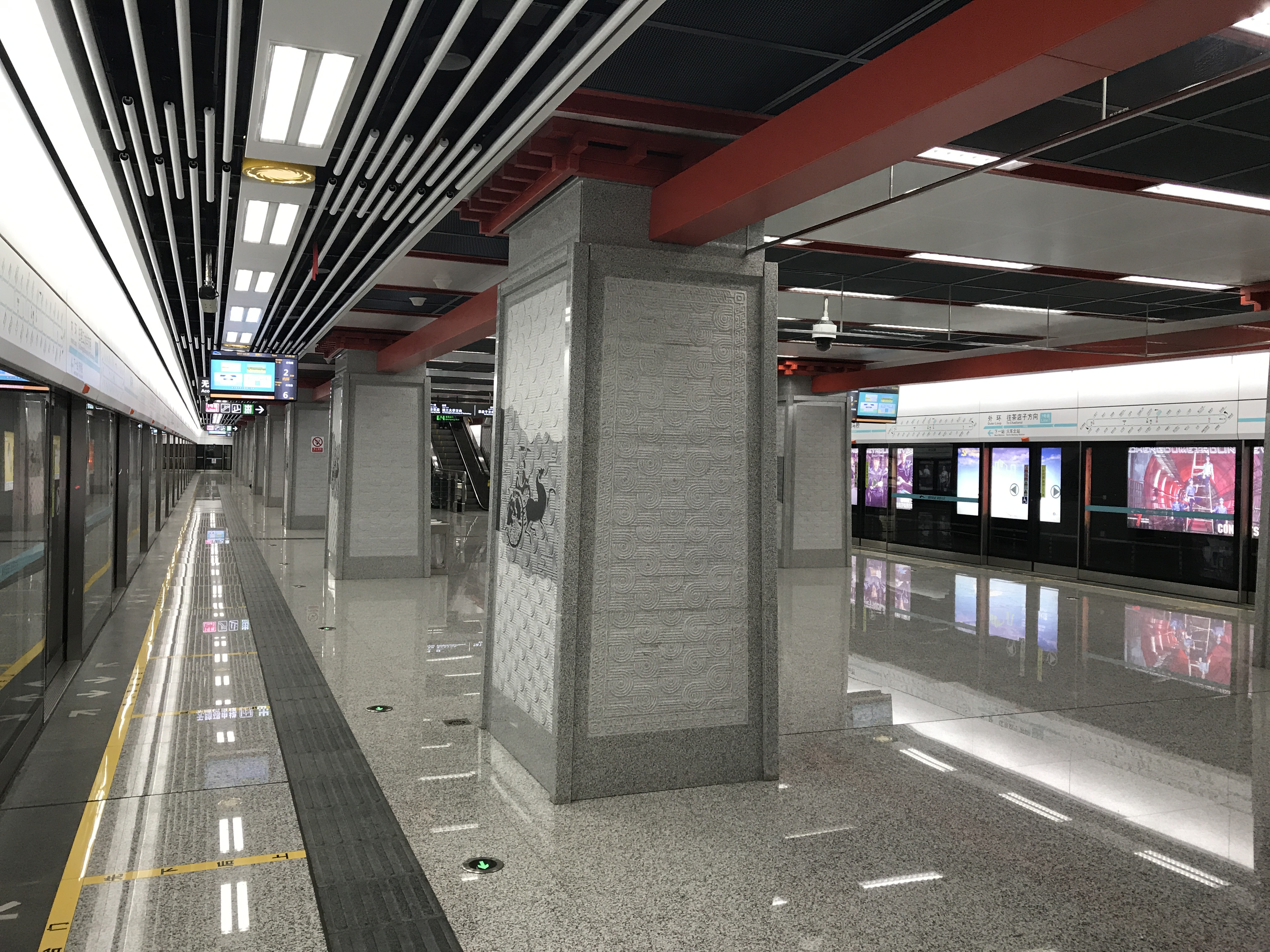
Line 7 platform
