= Chengdu University of Technology station =

Chengdu Metro station

Chengdu University of Technology 理工大学
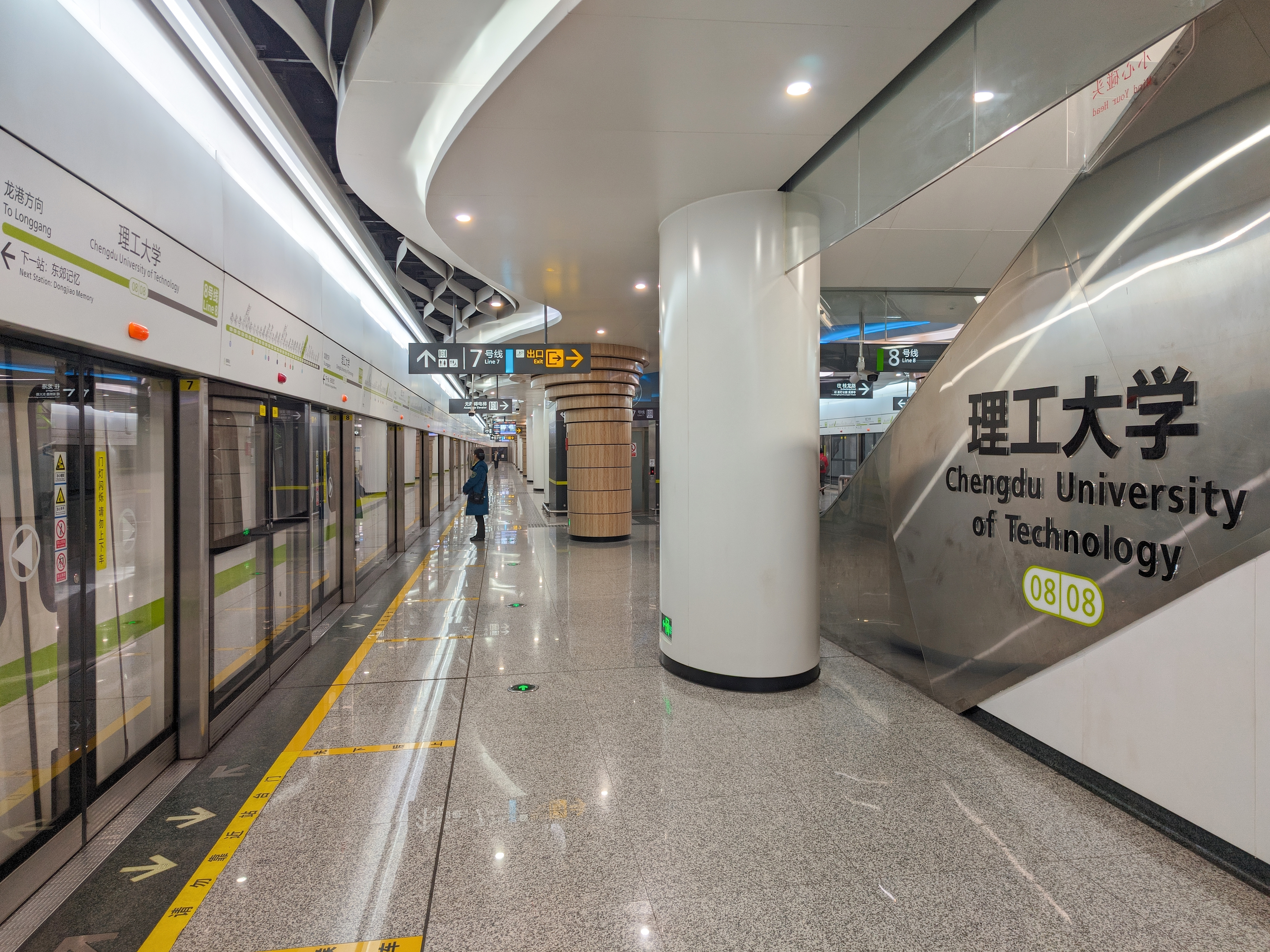
- Line 8 platform

General information
- Location: Chenghua District, Chengdu, Sichuan; China
- Coordinates: 30.67664°N 104.1326°E
- Operator: Chengdu Metro Limited
- Lines: Line 7 Line 8
- Platforms: 4 (2 island platforms)

Other information
- Station code: 0727 0808

History
- Opened: 6 December 2017

Services
Preceding station	Chengdu Metro	Following station
Cuijiadian Clockwise	Line 7	Erxianqiao Anticlockwise
Shilidian towards Guilong Road	Line 8	Dongjiao Memory towards Longgang
Location

Chengdu University of Technology (Chinese: 理工大学) is a station on Line 7 and Line 8 of the Chengdu Metro in China. It was opened on 6 December 2017. The station serves the nearby Chengdu University of Technology.

== Station layout ==
G	Entrances and Exits	Exits A, B, D, E
B1	Concourse	Faregates, Station Agent
B2	Clockwise	← Line 7 to Cuijiadian (Cuijiadian)
B2	Island platform, doors open on the left
B2	Counterclockwise	Line 7 to Cuijiadian (Erxianqiao) →
B3	Northbound	← Line 8 to Guilong Road (Shilidian)
B3	Island platform, doors open on the left
B3	Southbound	Line 8 to Longgang (Dongjiao Memory) →

== Gallery ==
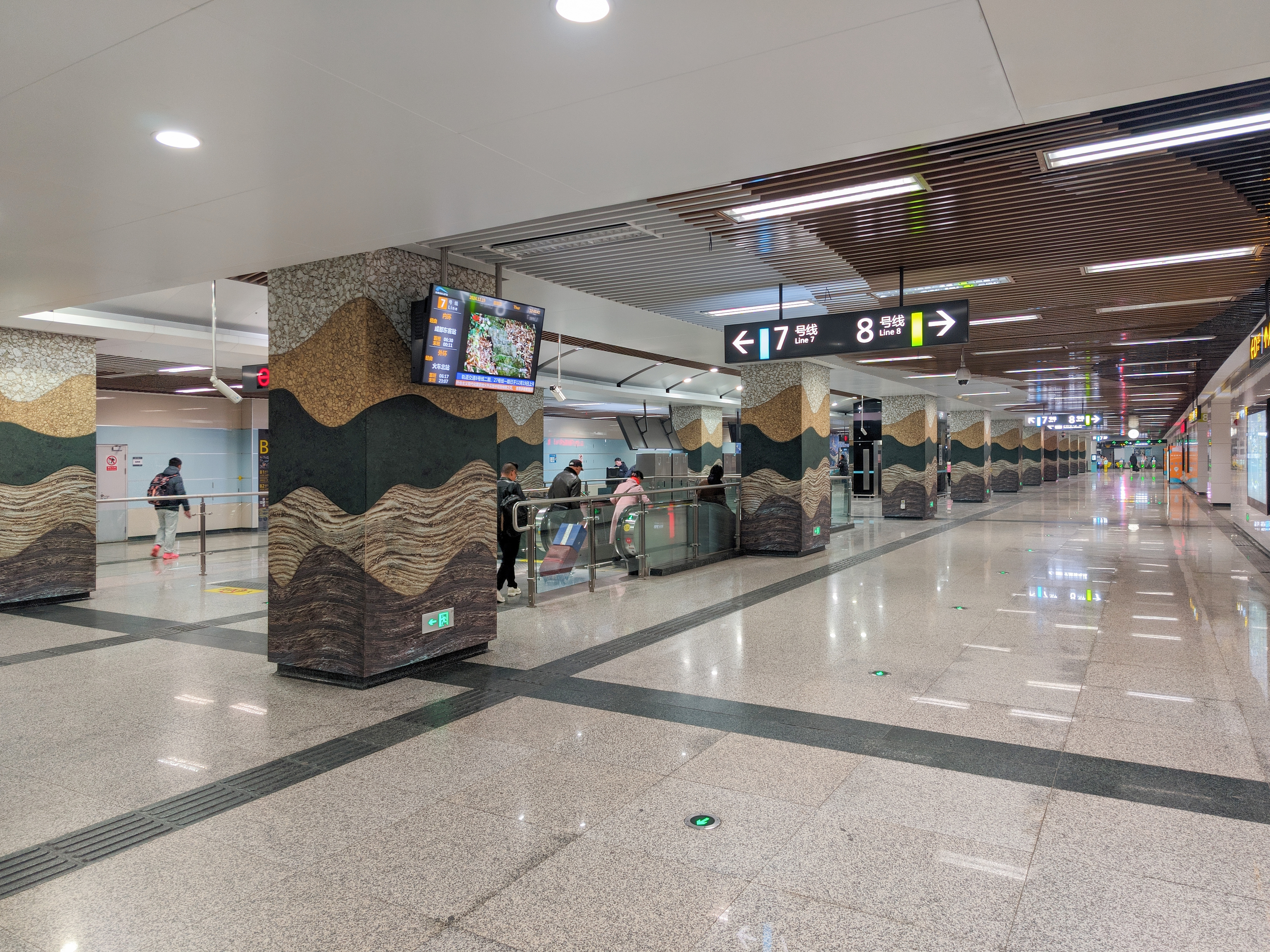
Line 7 concourse

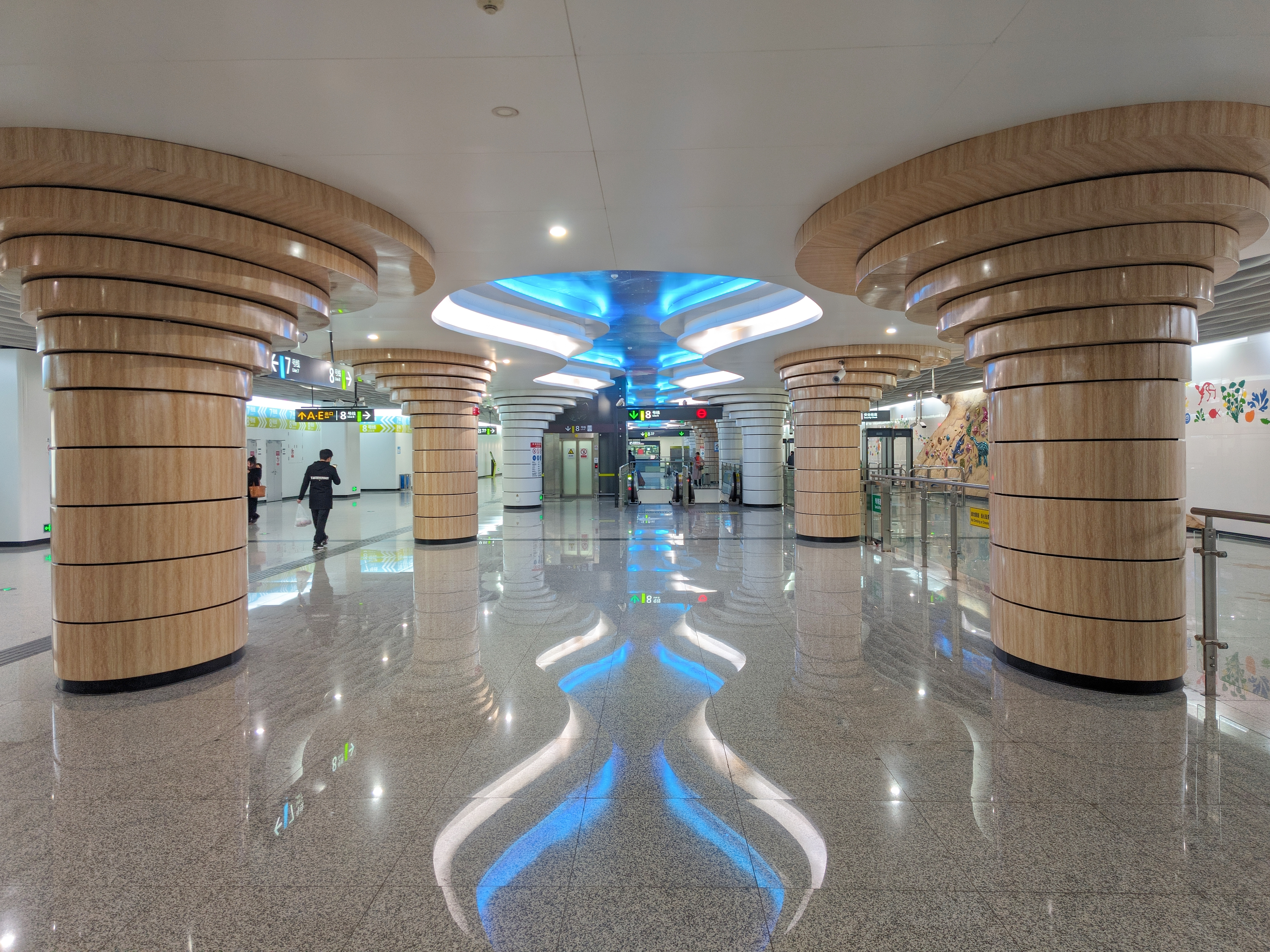
Line 8 concourse

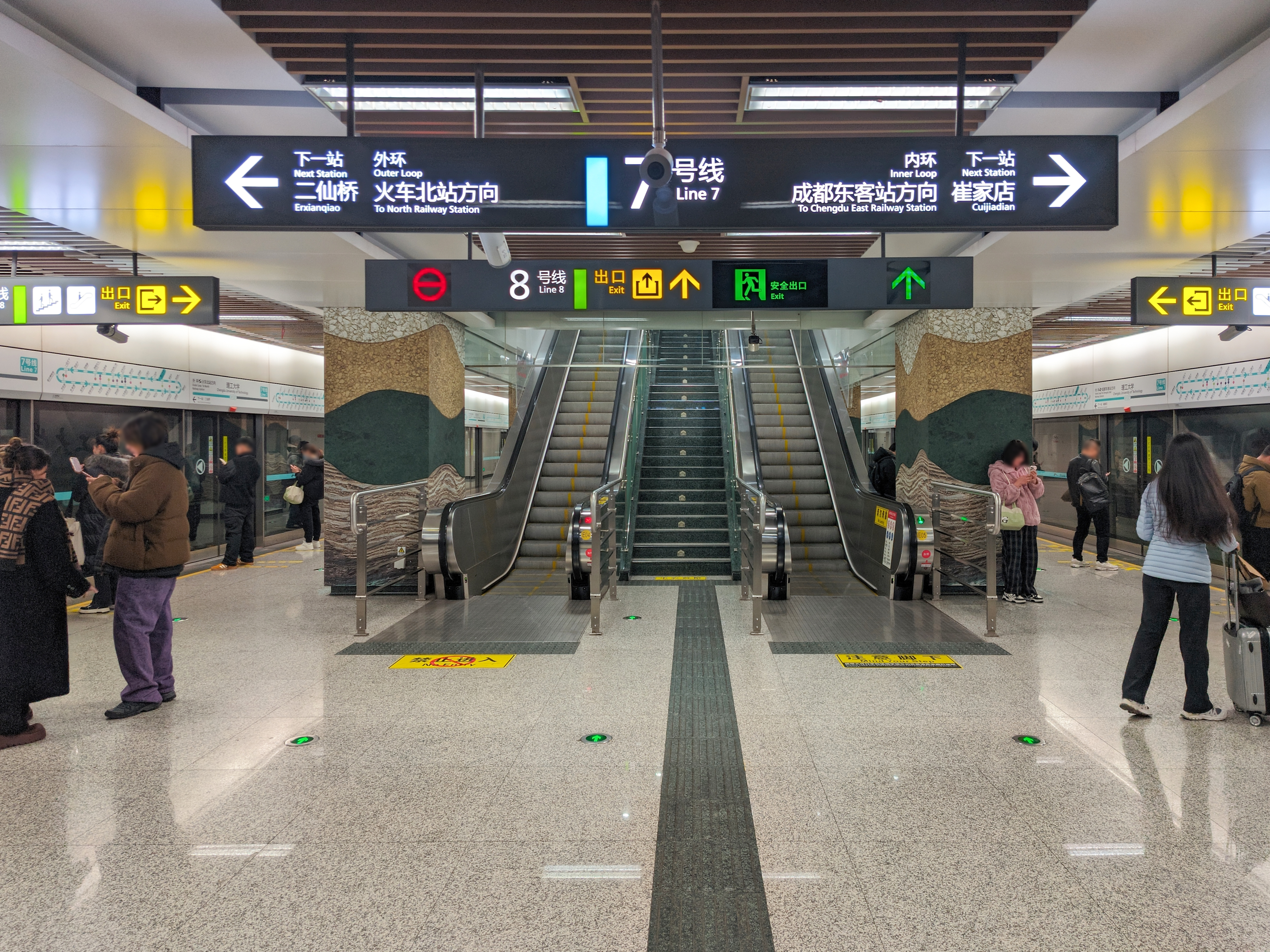
Line 7 platform

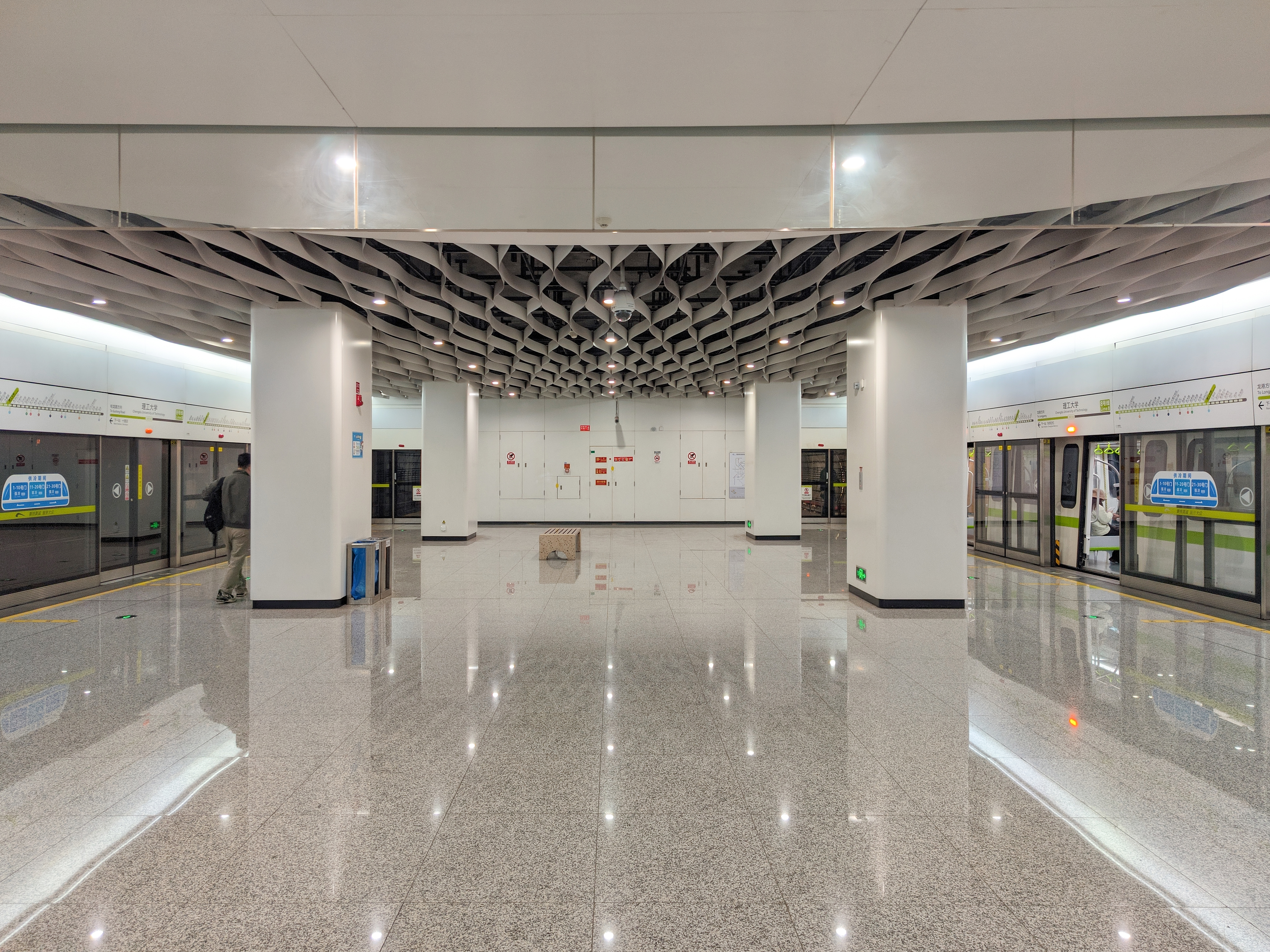
Line 8 platform
