= Chengdu BRT =

Public transport system in Chengdu, China

Chengdu Bus Rapid Transit
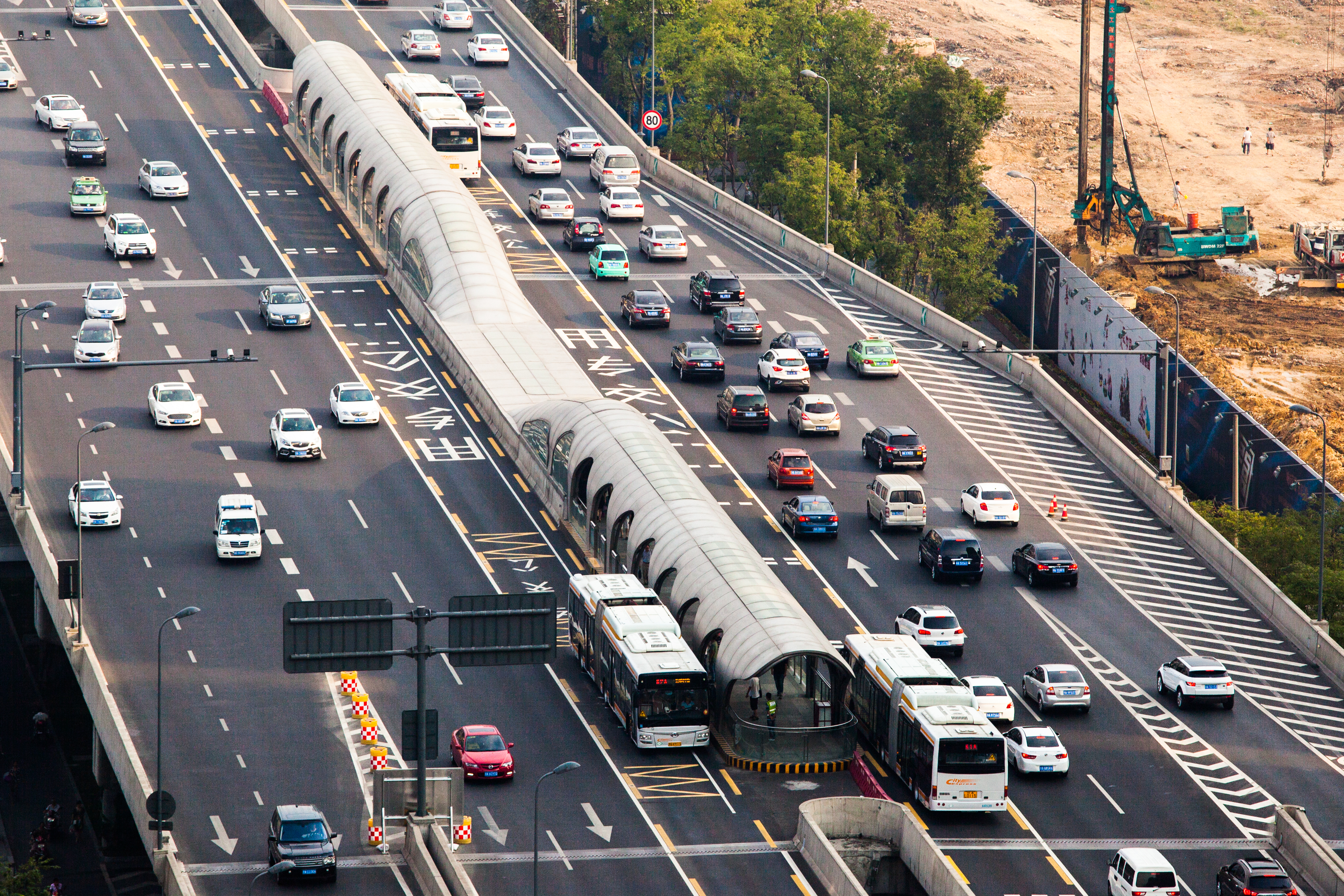

Overview
- Locale: Chengdu
- Transit type: Bus rapid transit
- Number of lines: 4
- Number of stations: 29
- Website: http://www.cdgjbus.com/

Operation
- Began operation: June 11, 2013

Technical
- System length: 28.3 km (17.6 mi)
- Average speed: 25 km/h (16 mph)
- Top speed: 80 km/h (50 mph)

Chengdu Bus Rapid Transit
- Simplified Chinese: 成都快速公交
- Traditional Chinese: 成都快速公交
Transcriptions
Standard Mandarin
- Hanyu Pinyin: Chéngdū Kuàisù Gōngjiāo

Alternative Chinese name
- Chinese: 成都 BRT
Transcriptions
Standard Mandarin
- Hanyu Pinyin: Chéngdū BRT

Chengdu Bus Rapid Transit is a bus rapid transit system in Chengdu, the capital of Sichuan Province, in the People's Republic of China.

== Description ==
The current system consists of a loop line integrated with the Chengdu Second Ring Road with dedicated bus lanes running in the center two lanes of the expressway. Transfers are available to several Chengdu Metro stations.

== History ==
The line began a free trial run on May 31, 2013, and started official operation on June 11, 2013. It has 29 center platform stations located in expressway median which requires special buses with the doors on the left. The loop is served by Lines K1, K1A, K2 and K2A. All buses have wifi.

== Expansion ==
A new 7.8 km (4.8 mi) radial line heading northeast from the BRT loop to Qingbaijiang District is under construction. The line, called the Fenghuang Shan (Phoenix Mountain) BRT, is scheduled to open in 2017. Another 4.5 km (2.8 mi) elevated BRT line heading south of the BRT loop is also currently under construction. This line is known as the Jiannan Avenue BRT and is projected to open in 2018. Additional BRT lines are planned to radiate from the loop with lines heading west to Wenjiang District, east via Shanbanqiao Road, and south to Tianfu New Area. Additionally, another BRT loop along the Third Ring Road was proposed.
