= Cuijiadian station =

Chengdu Metro station

Cuijiadian 崔家店
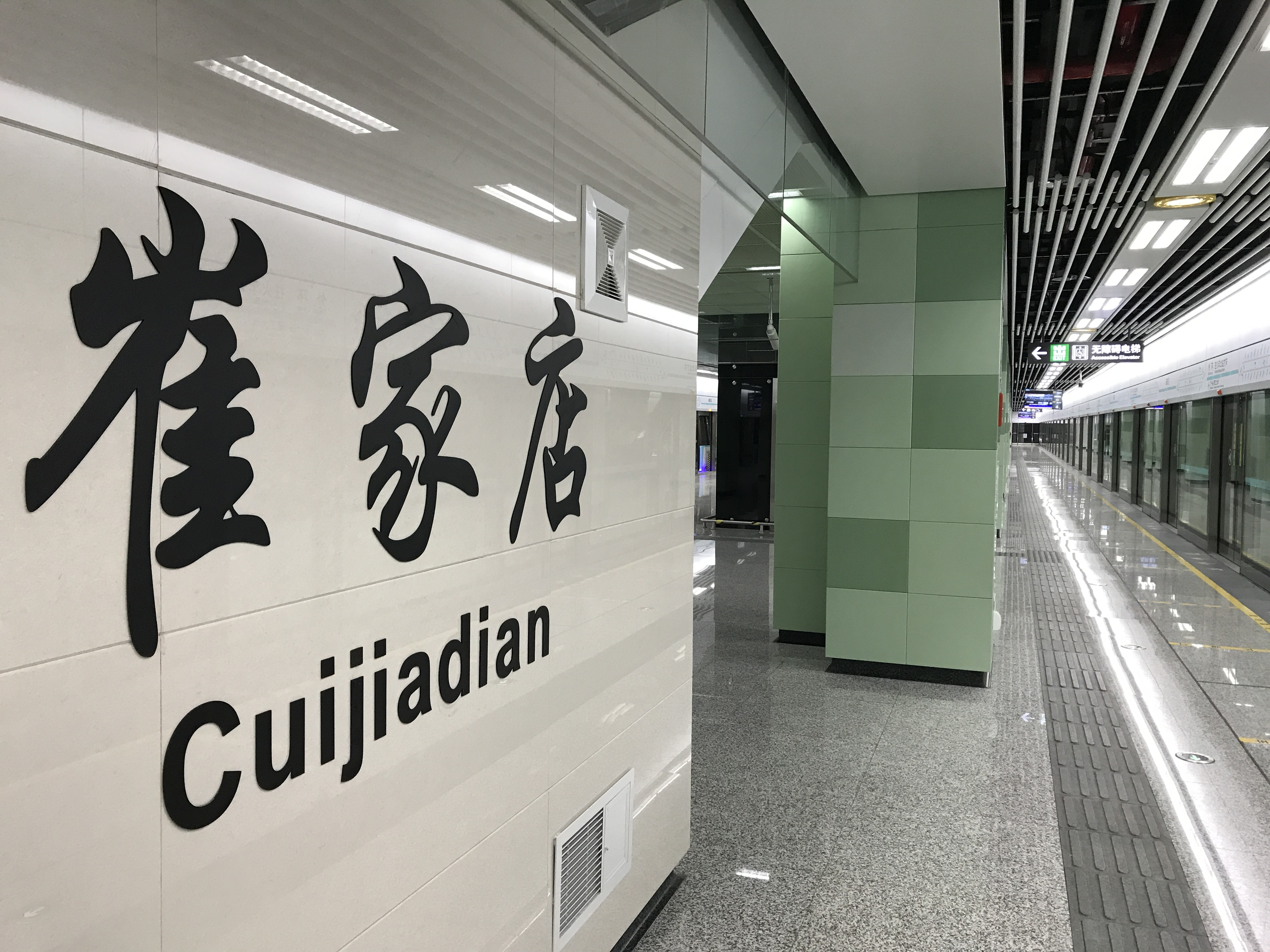

General information
- Location: Chenghua District, Chengdu, Sichuan; China
- Coordinates: 30.6671°N 104.1336°E
- Operator: Chengdu Metro Limited
- Line: Line 7
- Platforms: 2 (1 island platform)

Other information
- Station code: 0726

History
- Opened: 6 December 2017

Services
Preceding station	Chengdu Metro	Following station
Shuangdian Road Clockwise	Line 7	Chengdu University of Technology Anticlockwise
Location

Cuijiadian (Chinese: 崔家店) is a station on Line 7 of the Chengdu Metro in China. It was opened on 6 December 2017.

== Station layout ==
G	Entrances and exits	Exits A, F, G
B1	Concourse	Faregates, station agent
B2	Clockwise	← Line 7 to Cuijiadian (Shuangdian Road)
B2	Island platform, doors open on the left
B2	Counterclockwise	Line 7 to Cuijiadian (Chengdu University of Technology) →

== Gallery ==
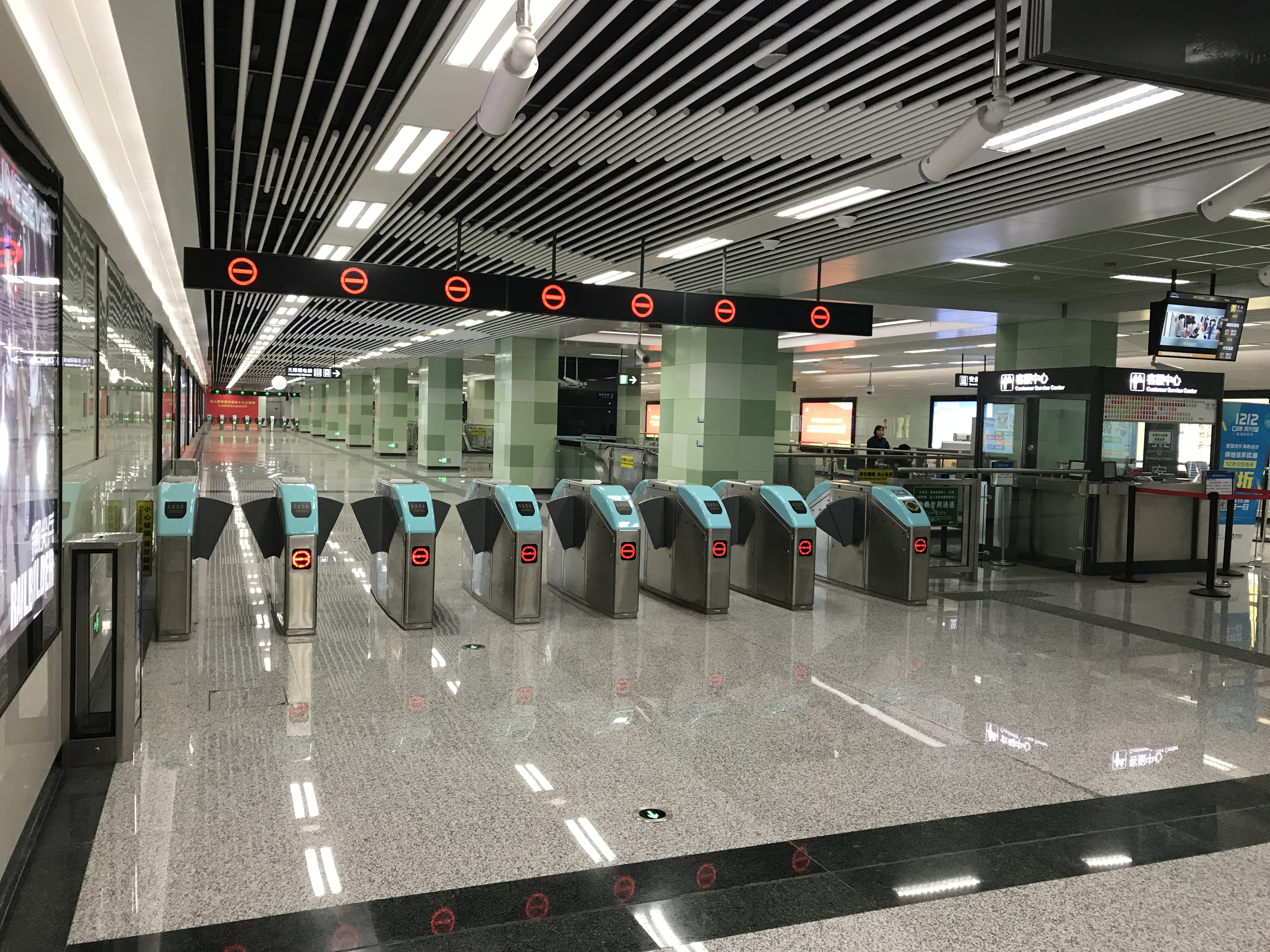
Concourse

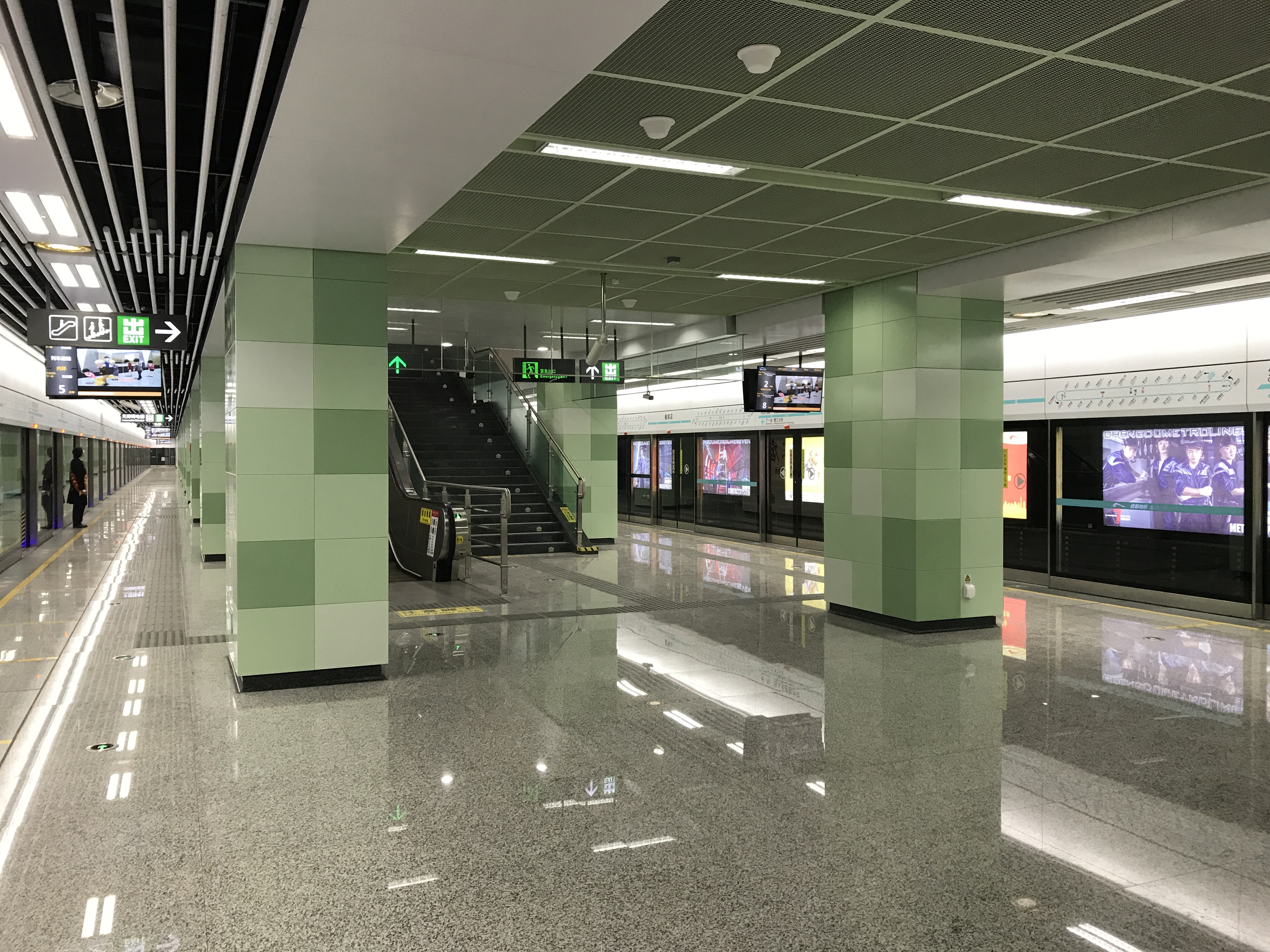
Platform
