= Chenghua, Chengdu =

Urban district of Chengdu, Sichuan, China

Chenghua 成华区
- District
- District of Chenghua, City of Chengdu
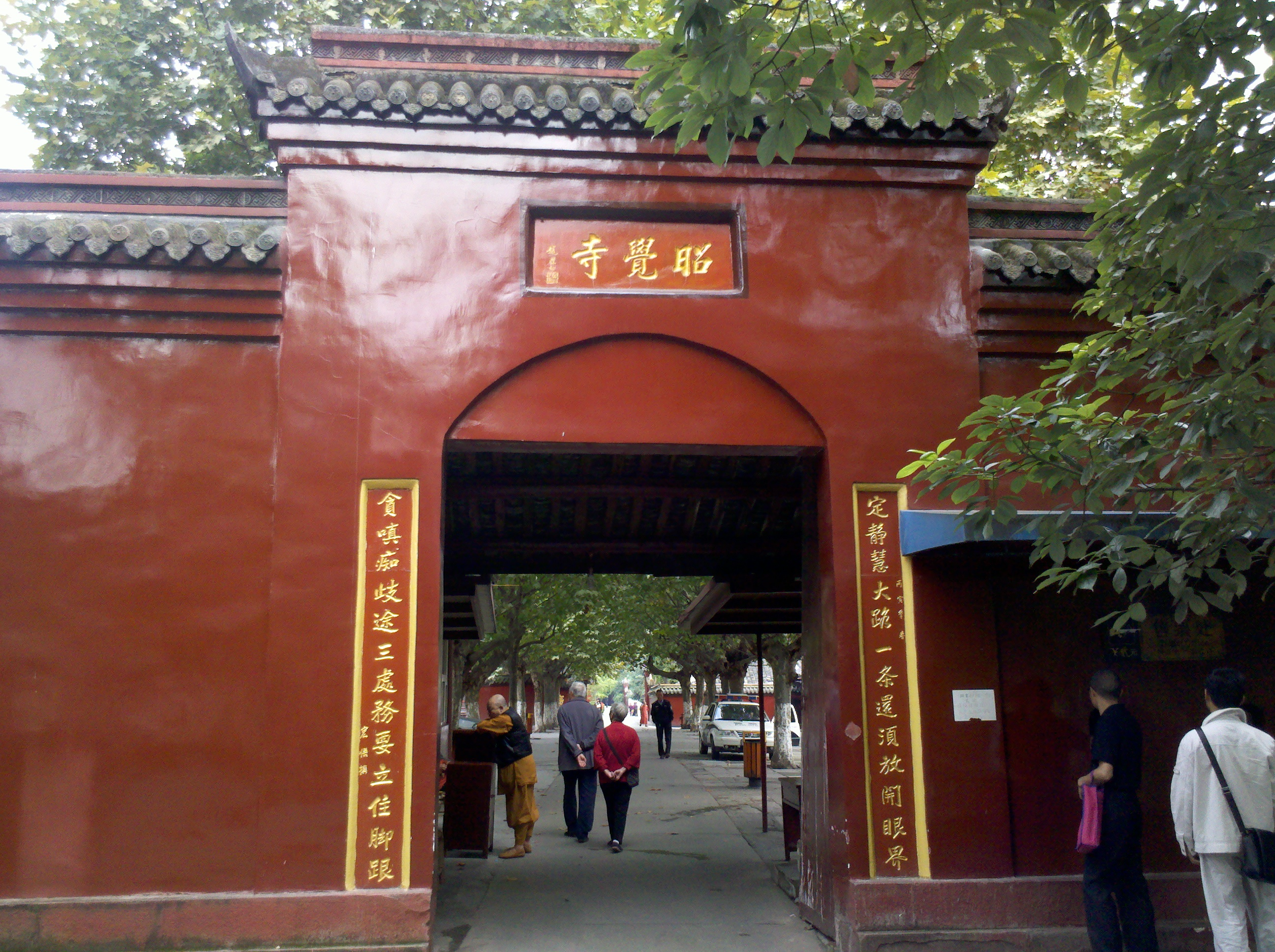
- Zhaojue Temple

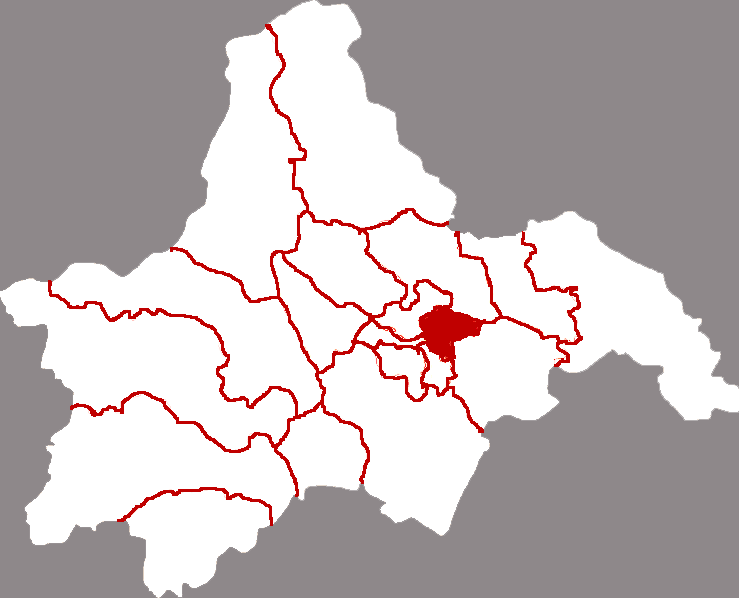
- Location of Chenghua in Chengdu

- Location in Sichuan
- Coordinates: 30°40′58″N 104°09′13″E
- Country: China
- Province: Sichuan
- Sub-provincial city: Chengdu
- Subdivisions: 14 subdistricts
- District seat: Mengzhuiwan Subdistrict

Area
  - Total: 110.6 km^{2} (42.7 sq mi)

Population (2020 census)
  - Total: 1,381,894
  - Density: 8,613/km^{2} (22,310/sq mi)
- Time zone: UTC+8 (China Standard)
- Website: www.chenghua.gov.cn

Chenghua District (Chinese: 成华区; pinyin: Chénghuá Qū) is an urban district of the City of Chengdu, capital of Sichuan, China.

Chenghua District covers part of the eastern portion of the city. As of 2020 it had a population of 1,381,894 residing in an area of 109 square kilometres (42 sq mi). The district is bordered by Xindu District to the northeast, Longquanyi District to the southeast, Jinjiang District to the south, and Jinniu District to the west.

== Administrative divisions ==
Chenghua District administers 11 subdistricts:

- Mengzhuiwan Subdistrict 猛追湾街道
- Shuanziqiao Subdistrict 双桥子街道
- Fuqinglu Subdistrict 府青路街道
- Erxianqiao Subdistrict 二仙桥街道
- Tiaodenghe Subdistrict 跳蹬河街道
- Shuangshuinian Subdistrict 双水碾街道
- Wannianchang Subdistrict 万年场街道
- Baohe Subdistrict 保和街道
- Qinglong Subdistrict 青龙街道
- Longtan Subdistrict 龙潭街道
- Bailianchi Subdistrict 白莲池街道

== Education ==
The Chengdu University of Technology is located in Chenghua.
