= Shuangqiao Road station =

Metro station in Chengdu, China

Shuangqiao Road 双桥路
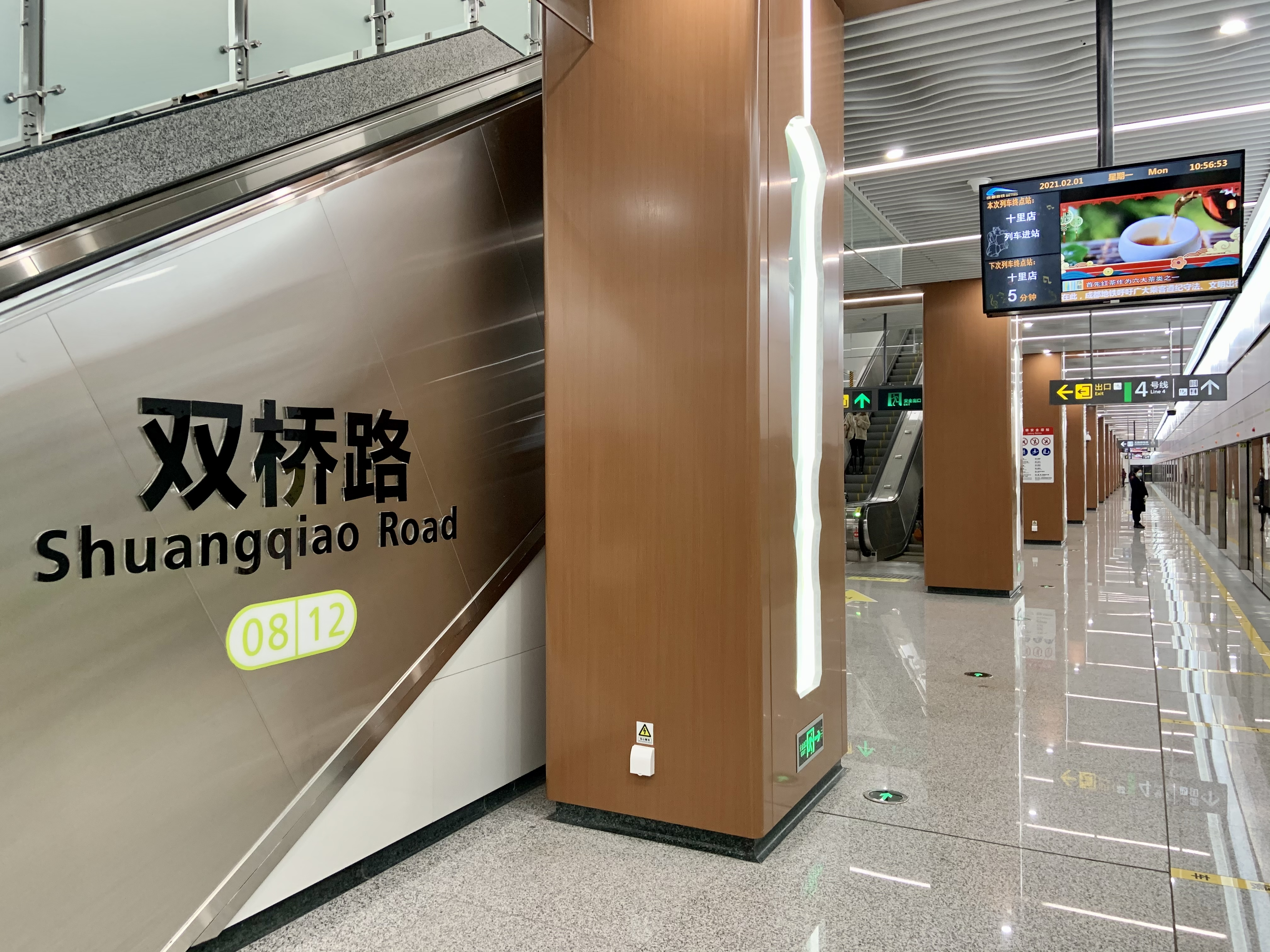
- Line 8 platform

General information
- Location: Chenghua District, Chengdu, Sichuan; China
- Operated by: Chengdu Metro Limited
- Lines: Line 4 Line 8
- Platforms: 4 (2 island platforms)

Other information
- Station code: 0408 0812

History
- Opened: 26 December 2015

Services
Preceding station	Chengdu Metro	Following station
Yushuang Road towards Wansheng	Line 4	Wannianchang towards Xihe
Wannian Road towards Guilong Road	Line 8	Dongdalu Road towards Longgang
Location

Shuangqiao Road station (Chinese: 双桥路站; pinyin: Shuāngqiáo Lù zhàn) is a station on Line 4 and Line 8 of the Chengdu Metro in China.

== Station layout ==
G	Entrances and Exits	Exits A, C-G
B1	Concourse	Faregates, Station Agent
B2	Westbound	← Line 4 towards Wansheng (Yushuang Road)
B2	Island platform, doors open on the left
B2	Easthbound	Line 4 towards Xihe (Wannianchang) →
B3	Northbound	← Line 8 towards Guilong Road (Wannian Road)
B3	Island platform, doors open on the left
B3	Southbound	Line 8 towards Longgang (Dongdalu Road) →

== Gallery ==
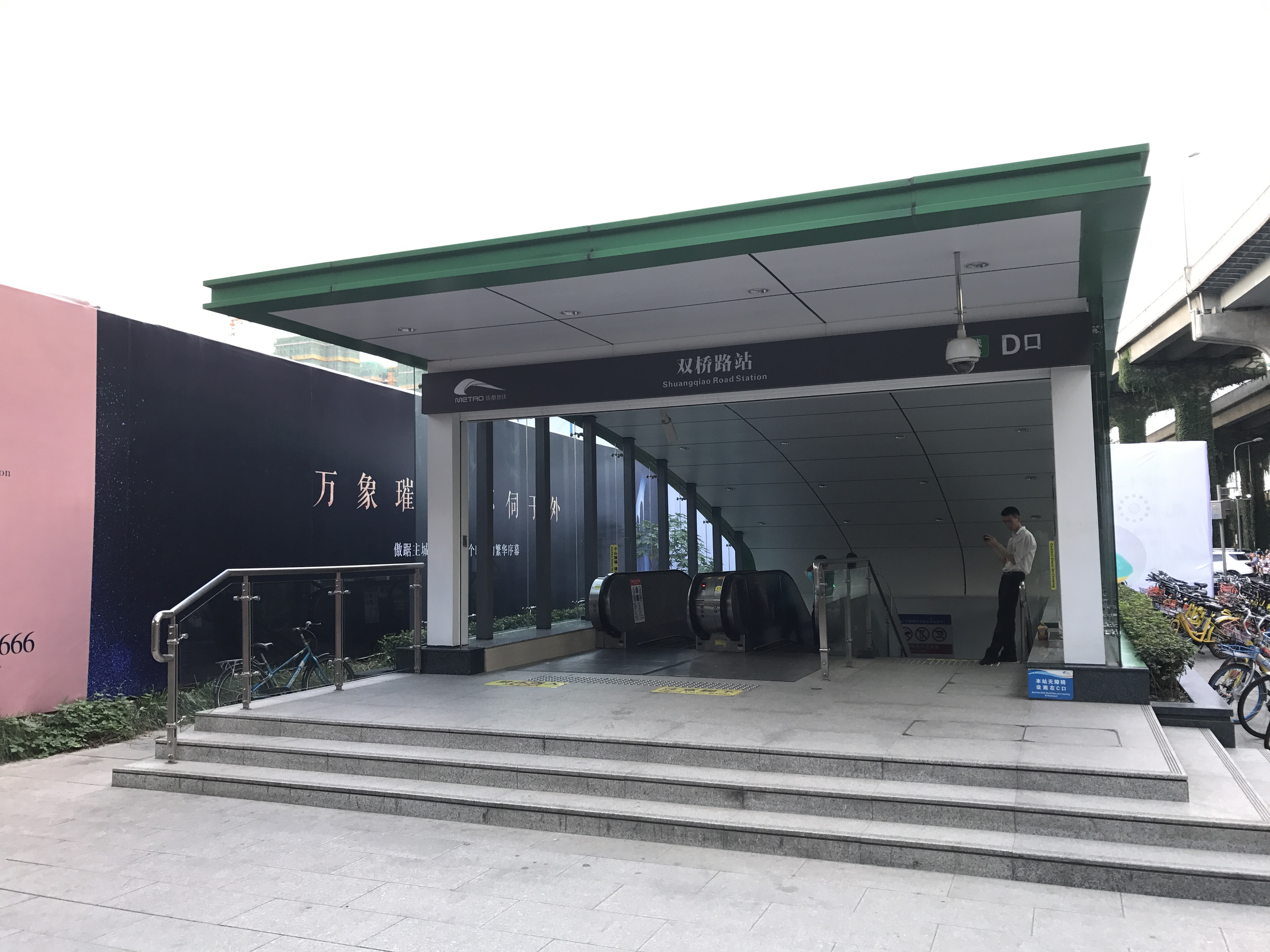
Entrance D

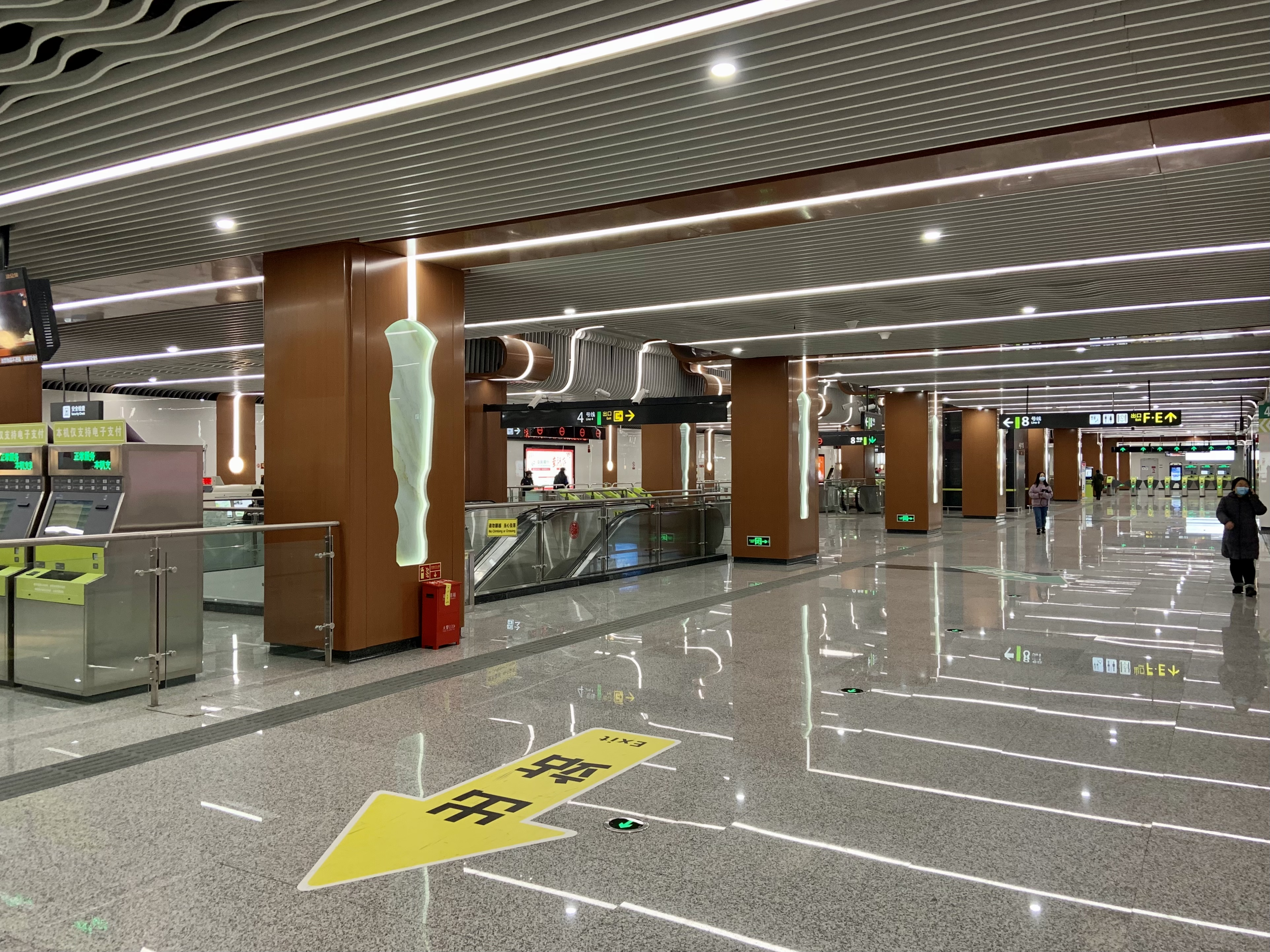
Concourse

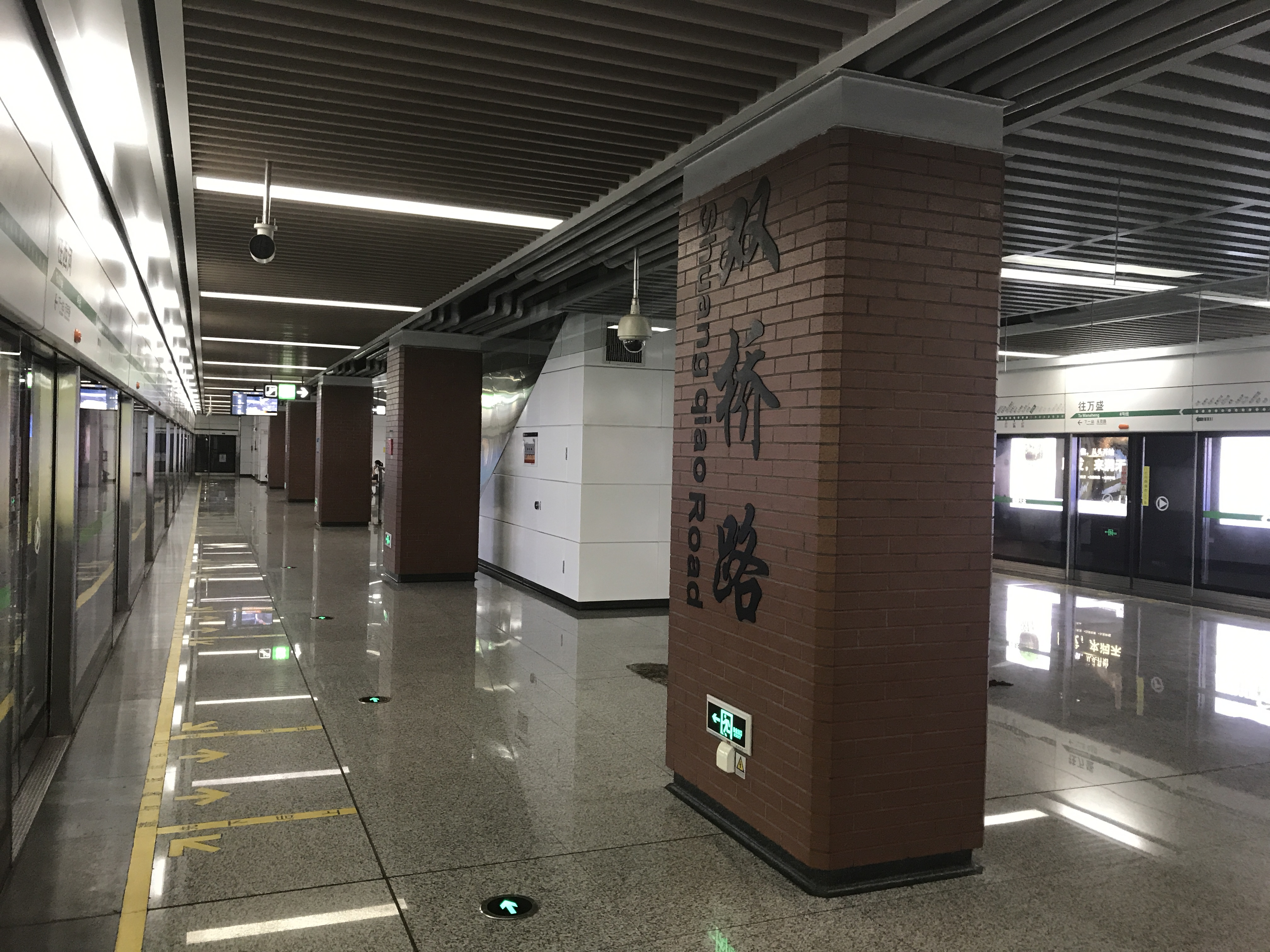
Line 4 platform

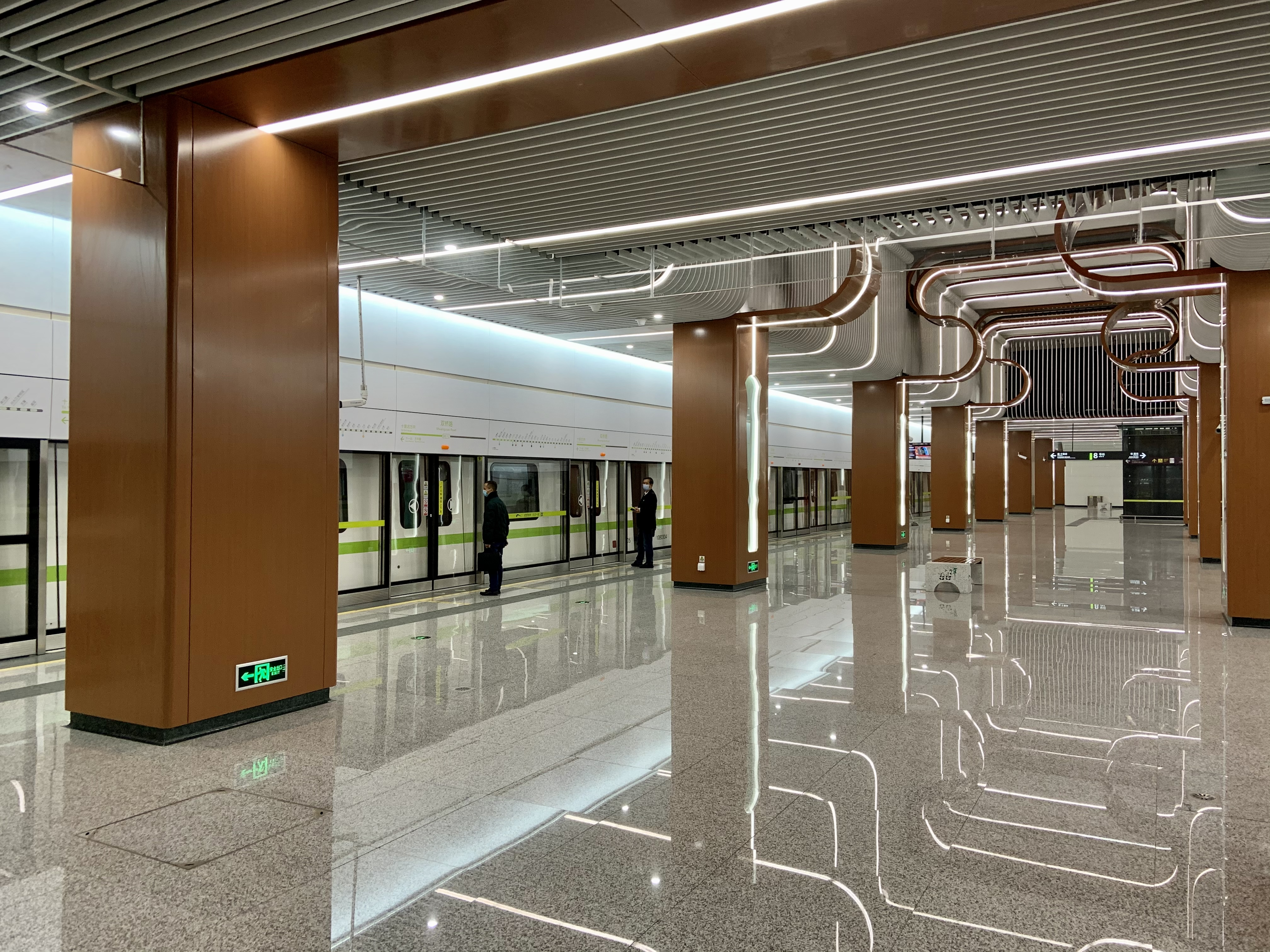
Line 8 platform
