= Wannian Road station =

Metro station in Chengdu, China

Coordinates: 30.6565°N 104.1127°E

Wannian Road 万年路
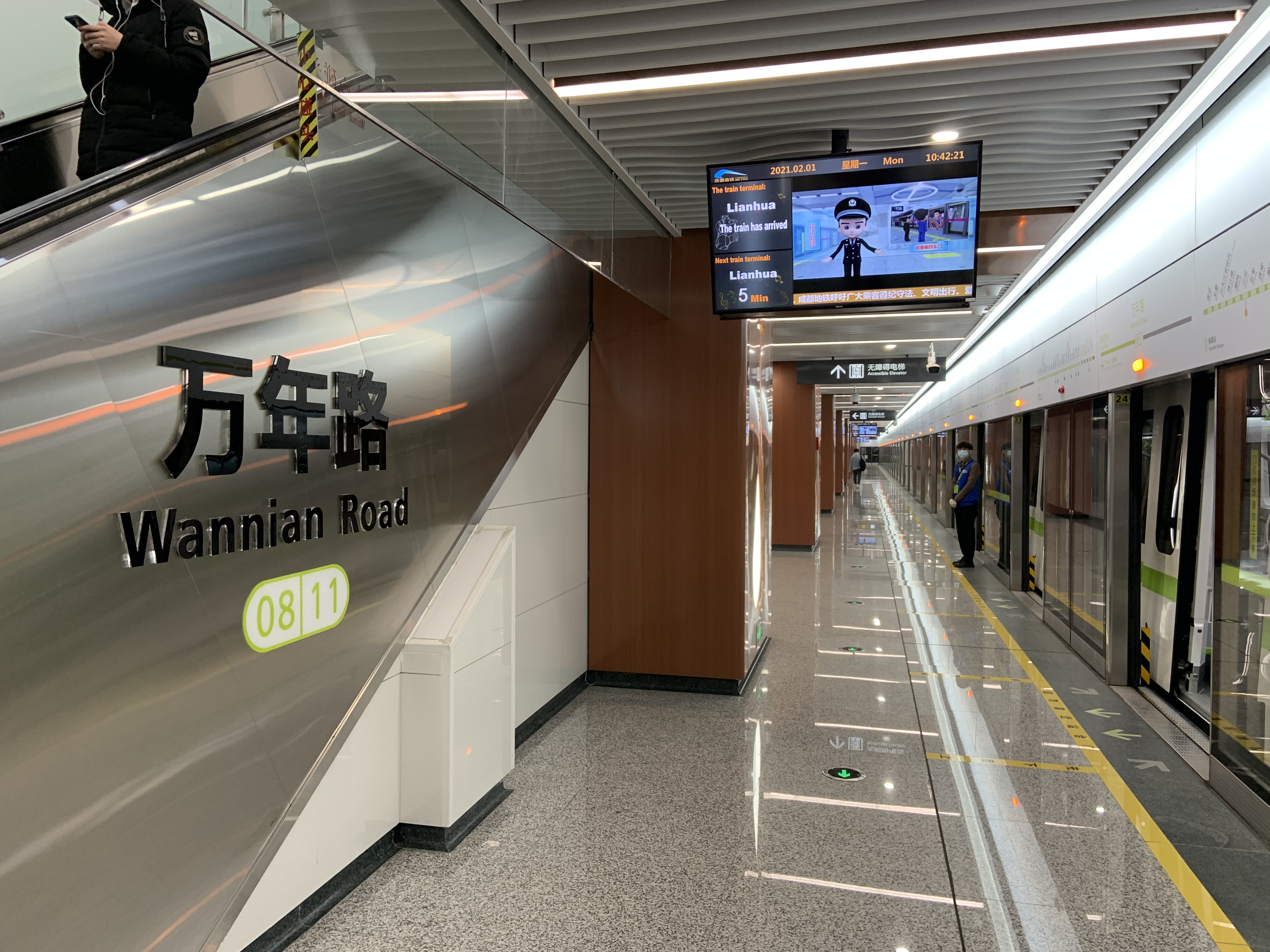

General information
- Location: Chenghua District, Chengdu, Sichuan; China
- Operated by: Chengdu Metro Limited
- Line(s): Line 8
- Platforms: 2 (1 island platform)

Other information
- Station code: 0811

History
- Opened: 18 December 2020

Services
Preceding station	Chengdu Metro	Following station
Shabanqiao towards Guilong Road	Line 8	Shuangqiao Road towards Longgang

Wannian Road station (Chinese: 万年路站; pinyin: Wànnián Lù zhàn) is a metro station at Chengdu, Sichuan, China. It was opened on December 18, 2020 with the opening of Chengdu Metro Line 8.

== Gallery ==
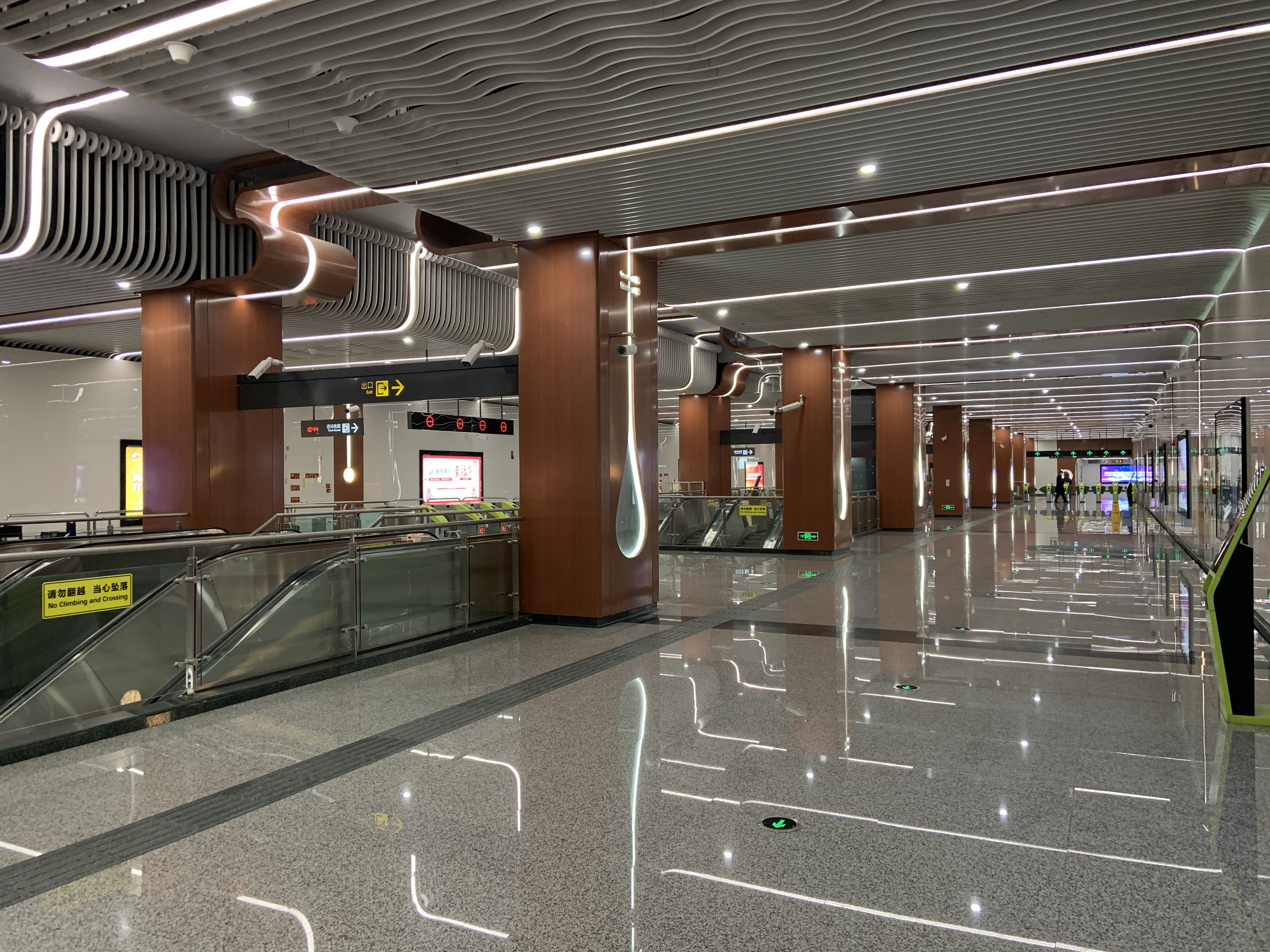
Concourse

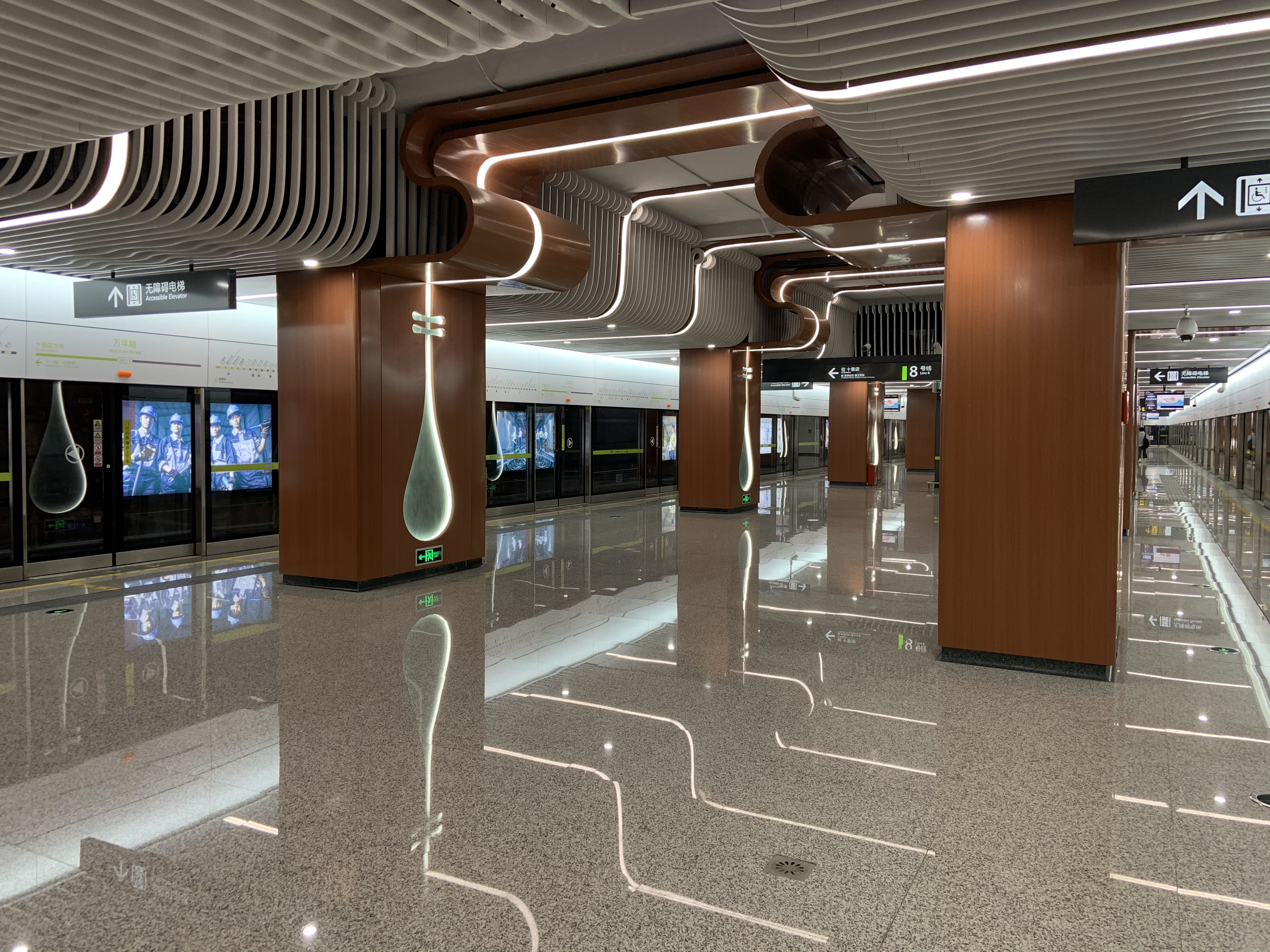
Platform
