= Dongjiao Memory =

Neighborhood in Chengdu, Sichuan, China

- 东郊记忆 (Chinese)
- Location: Chenghua, Chengdu, Sichuan, China

History
- Built: 1958
- Built for: Chengdu National Hongguang Electron Tube Factory
- Original use: Electronics manufacturing complex

Site notes
- Architectural style: Industrial architecture
- Current use: Cultural and creative district
- Owner: Chengdu Media Group

Dongjiao Memory (Chinese: 东郊记忆; pinyin: Dōngjiāo Jìyì; lit. 'Eastern Suburb Memory') is a cultural and creative neighborhood in the Chenghua district of Chengdu, Sichuan, China. It was developed from the former site of the Chengdu National Hongguang Electron Tube Factory (成都国营红光电子管厂), a major electronics industrial facility established in 1958. The district is known for its preservation of industrial architecture, including factory buildings, chimneys, pipelines, and other structures, combined with modern cultural uses such as music performances, art exhibitions, creative industries, and commercial spaces. It is considered one of Chengdu's representative examples of industrial heritage reuse and urban cultural regeneration.

Dongjiao Memory is served by Dongjiao Memory station on Line 8 of Chengdu Metro.

== History ==
=== Industrial period ===
The site of Dongjiao Memory was originally part of Chengdu's eastern industrial area. The Chengdu National Hongguang Electron Tube Factory was established in 1958 as part of China's early electronics industry development. The factory became an important producer of electronic components and was associated with several milestones in China's television and display technology industry.

During the planned economy period, the eastern suburbs of Chengdu became a major industrial center. Large factories, research facilities, and workers' communities formed an important part of the city's modern industrial history.

=== Transformation into a cultural district ===
In the early 21st century, as Chengdu's industrial structure changed, parts of the former factory area were redeveloped for cultural and creative uses. The Chengdu municipal government transferred the former Hongguang Electron Tube Factory site for adaptive reuse, and Chengdu Media Group participated in its redevelopment.

The redevelopment project was initially opened on 29 September 2011 as Chengdu Eastern Suburb Music Park (成都东区音乐公园). It was renamed Dongjiao Memory on 1 November 2012. The project adopted an approach of preserving industrial remains while introducing new cultural and commercial functions. Architects involved in the transformation followed the principle of "repairing the old as the old and using old buildings for new purposes" (修旧如旧，旧房新用). The redevelopment retained industrial features while adapting buildings for contemporary activities.

== Features ==
Dongjiao Memory preserves a range of industrial structures from the former factory complex. These include brick buildings, industrial pipelines, and tall chimneys that have become recognizable symbols of the district. The district combines industrial heritage with cultural and creative industries. Its facilities include music venues, theaters, exhibition spaces, creative offices, restaurants, and retail businesses.

The area has hosted concerts, art exhibitions, theater performances, cultural festivals, and other public events. It has become a gathering place for music, design, youth culture, and creative enterprises in Chengdu.

Dongjiao Memory is part of a broader trend in China of converting former industrial sites into cultural districts. Its development reflects Chengdu's efforts to preserve industrial heritage while supporting cultural industries and urban renewal.

The district has received recognition as a cultural and tourism destination. It has been designated by the Chinese government as a National Cultural Industry Demonstration Base (国家文化产业示范基地), a National Music Industry Base (国家音乐产业基地), a National Industrial Heritage Tourism Base (国家工业遗产旅游基地), a National Industrial Heritage site (国家工业遗产), and a national News and Publishing Industry Demonstration Project (新闻出版产业示范项目), among other titles.
