= Shiling station =

Station on Line 4 of Chengdu Metro, China

Shiling 十陵
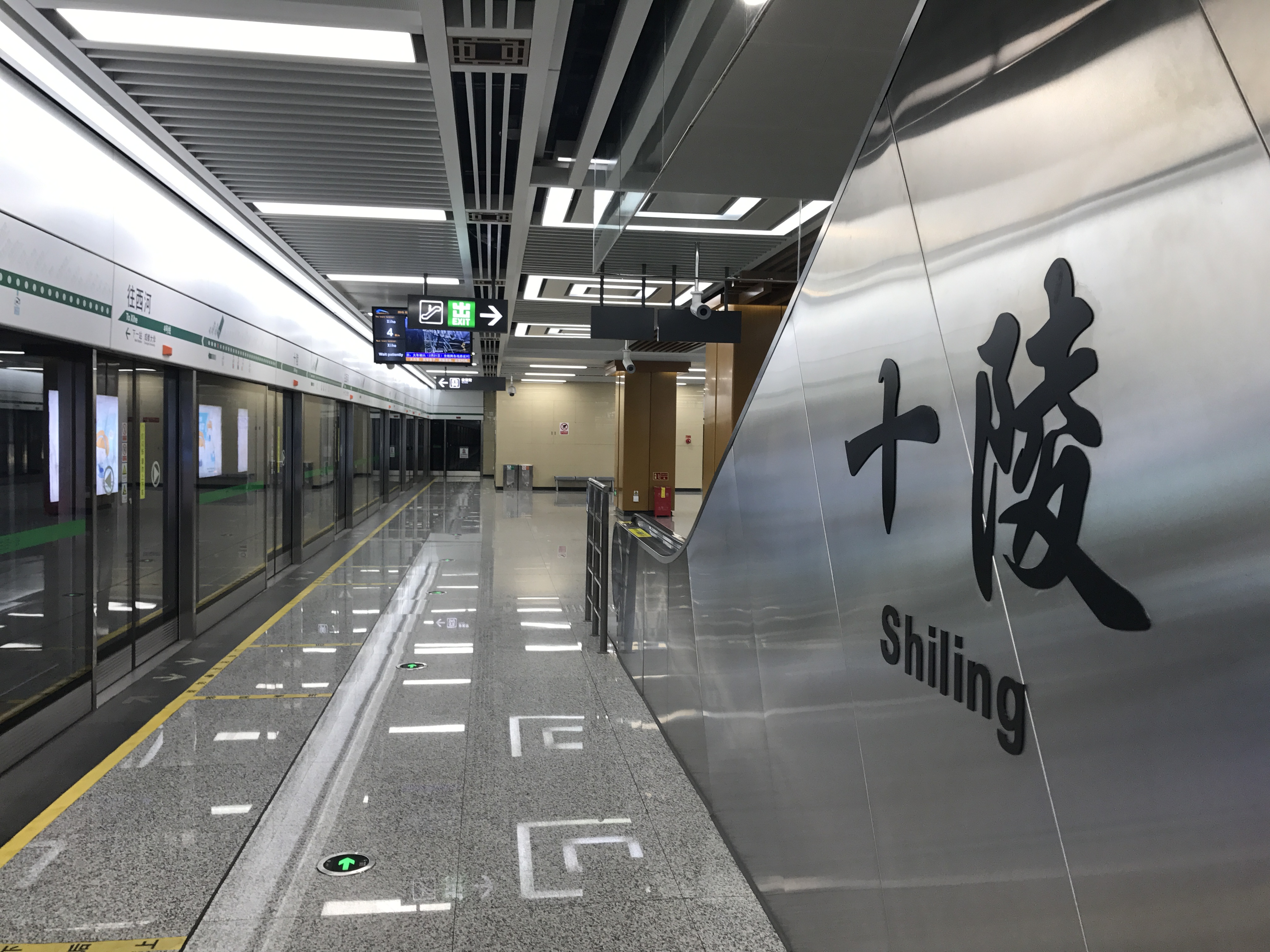

General information
- Location: Longquanyi District, Chengdu, Sichuan; China
- Operator: Chengdu Metro Limited
- Line: Line 4
- Platforms: 2 (1 island platform)

Other information
- Station code: 0404

History
- Opened: 2 June 2017

Services
Preceding station	Chengdu Metro	Following station
Lailong towards Wansheng	Line 4	Chengdu University towards Xihe
Location

Shiling (Chinese: 十陵) is a station on Line 4 of the Chengdu Metro in China.

== Station layout ==
G	Entrances and Exits	Exits A-C
B1	Concourse	Faregates, Station Agent
B2	Westbound	← Line 4 towards Wansheng (Lailong)
B2	Island platform, doors open on the left
B2	Easthbound	Line 4 towards Xihe (Chengdu University) →

== Gallery ==
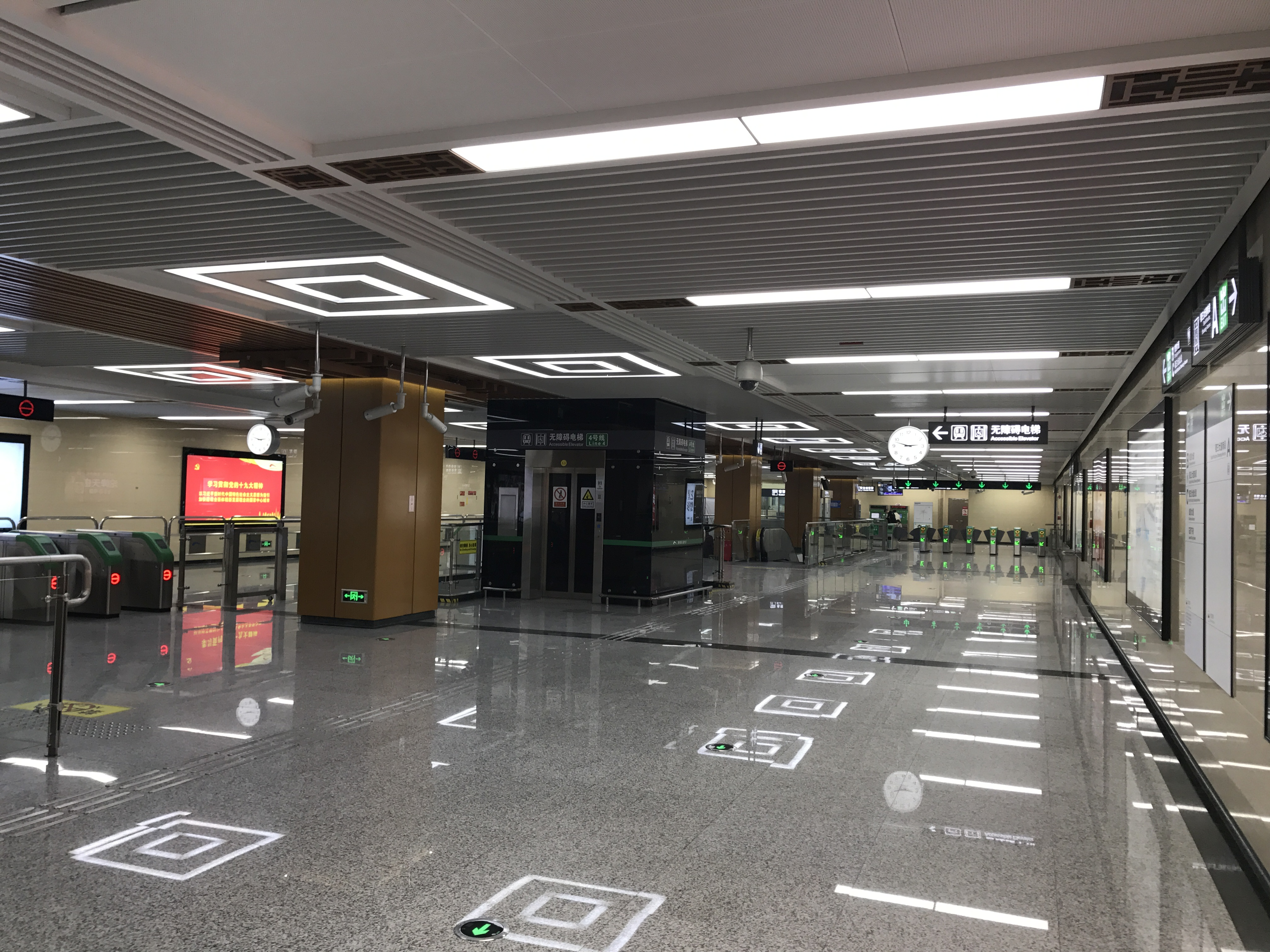
Concourse

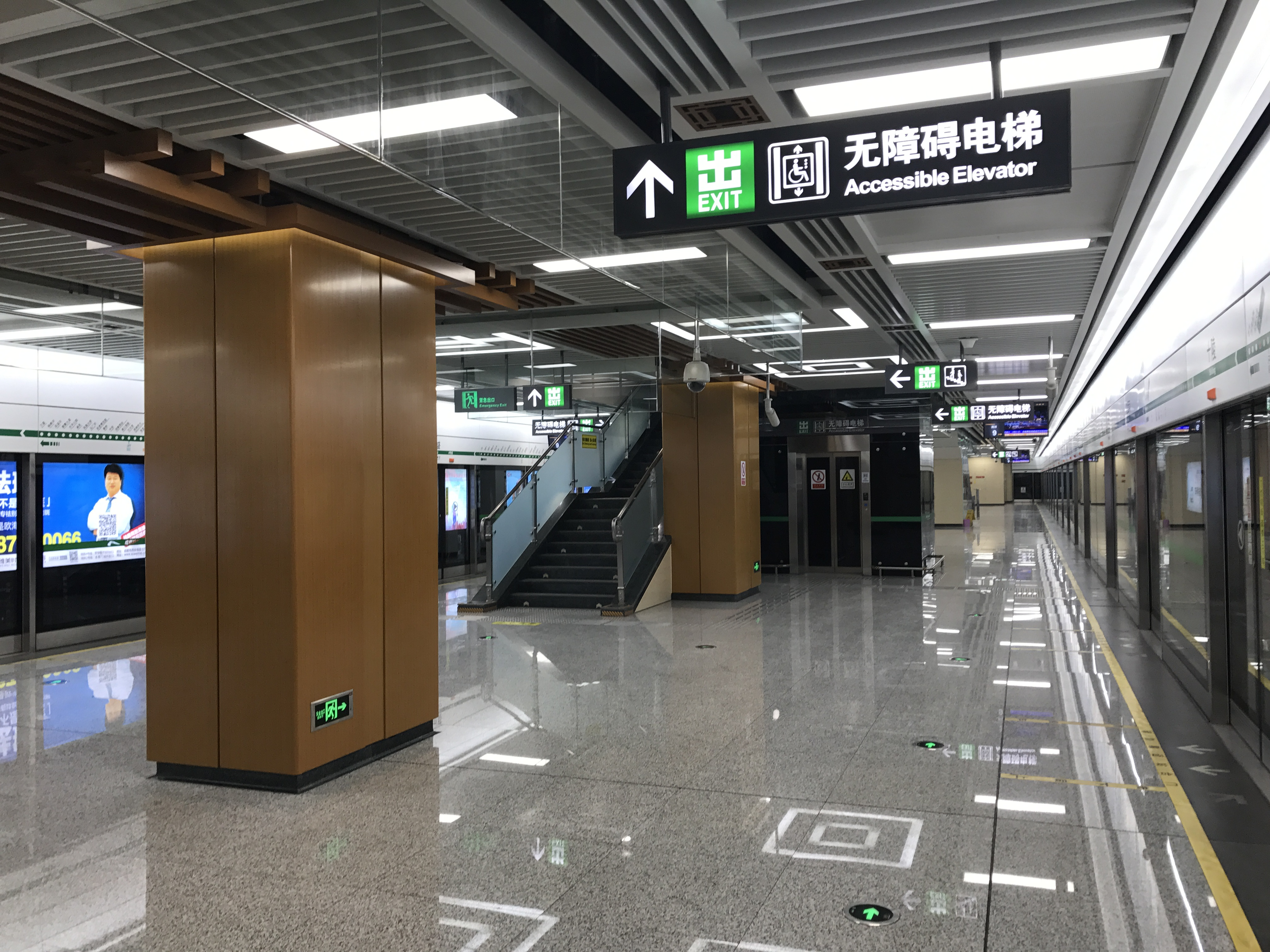
Platform
