= Lailong station =

Metro station in Chengdu, China

Coordinates: 30.6466°N 104.1644°E

Lailong 来龙
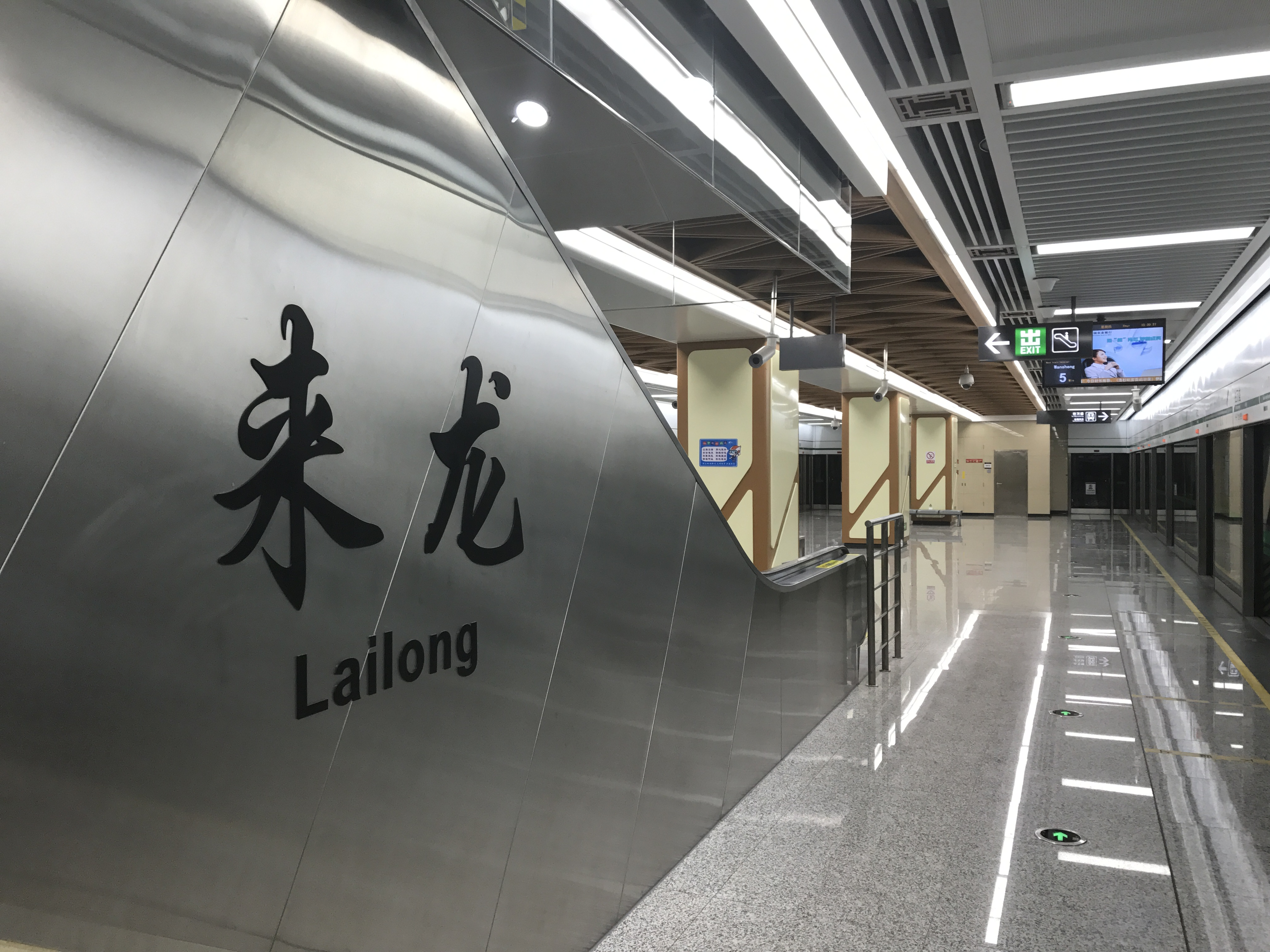

General information
- Location: Longquanyi District, Chengdu, Sichuan; China
- Operator: Chengdu Metro Limited
- Line: Line 4
- Platforms: 2 (1 island platform)

Other information
- Station code: 0405

History
- Opened: 2 June 2017

Services
Preceding station	Chengdu Metro	Following station
Huaishudian towards Wansheng	Line 4	Shiling towards Xihe
Location

Lailong (Chinese: 来龙) is a station on Line 4 of the Chengdu Metro in China.

== Station layout ==
G	Entrances and Exits	Exits A, B, D
B1	Concourse	Faregates, Station Agent
B2	Westbound	← Line 4 towards Wansheng (Huaishudian)
B2	Island platform, doors open on the left
B2	Easthbound	Line 4 towards Xihe (Shiling) →

== Gallery ==
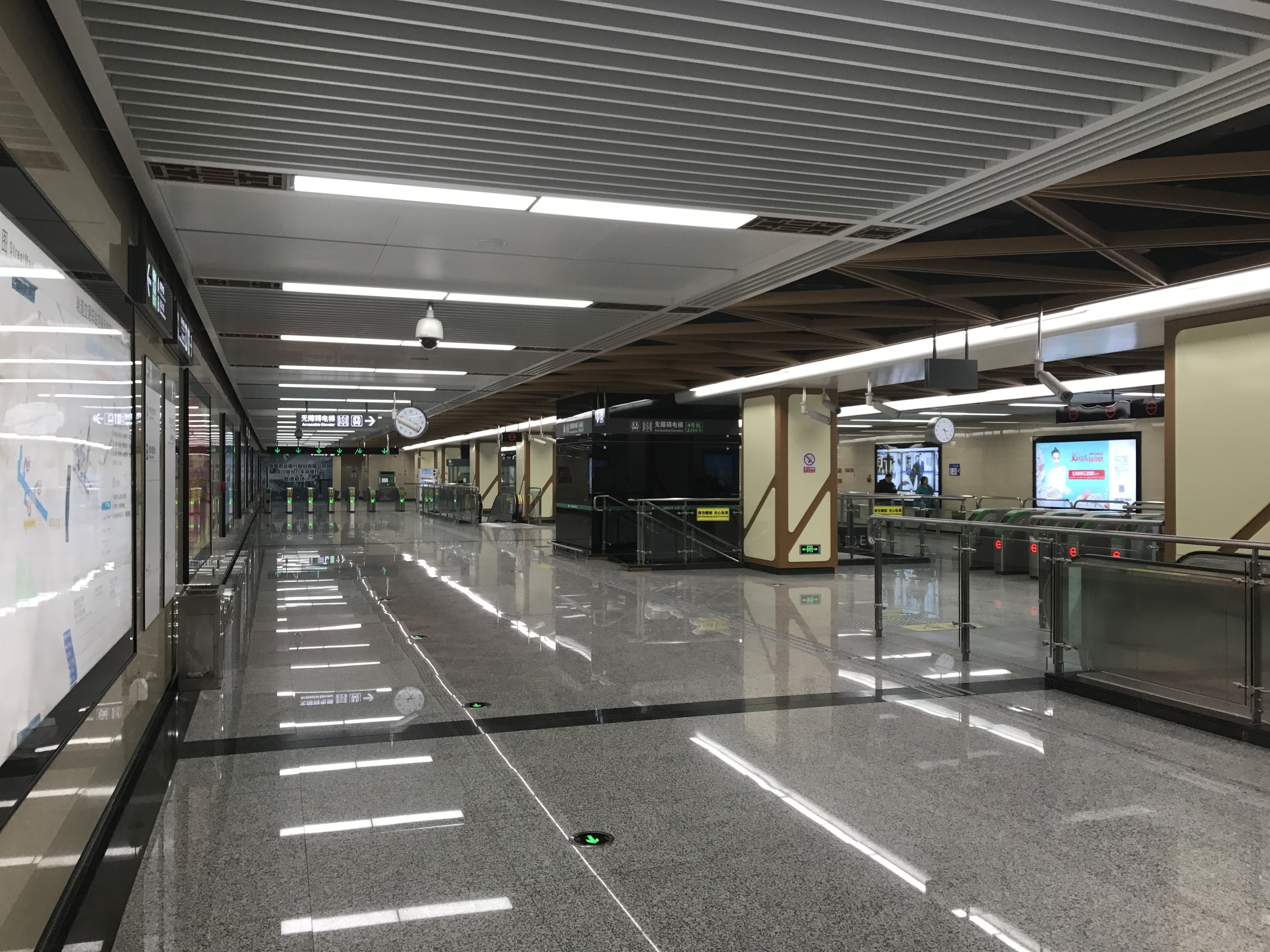
Concourse

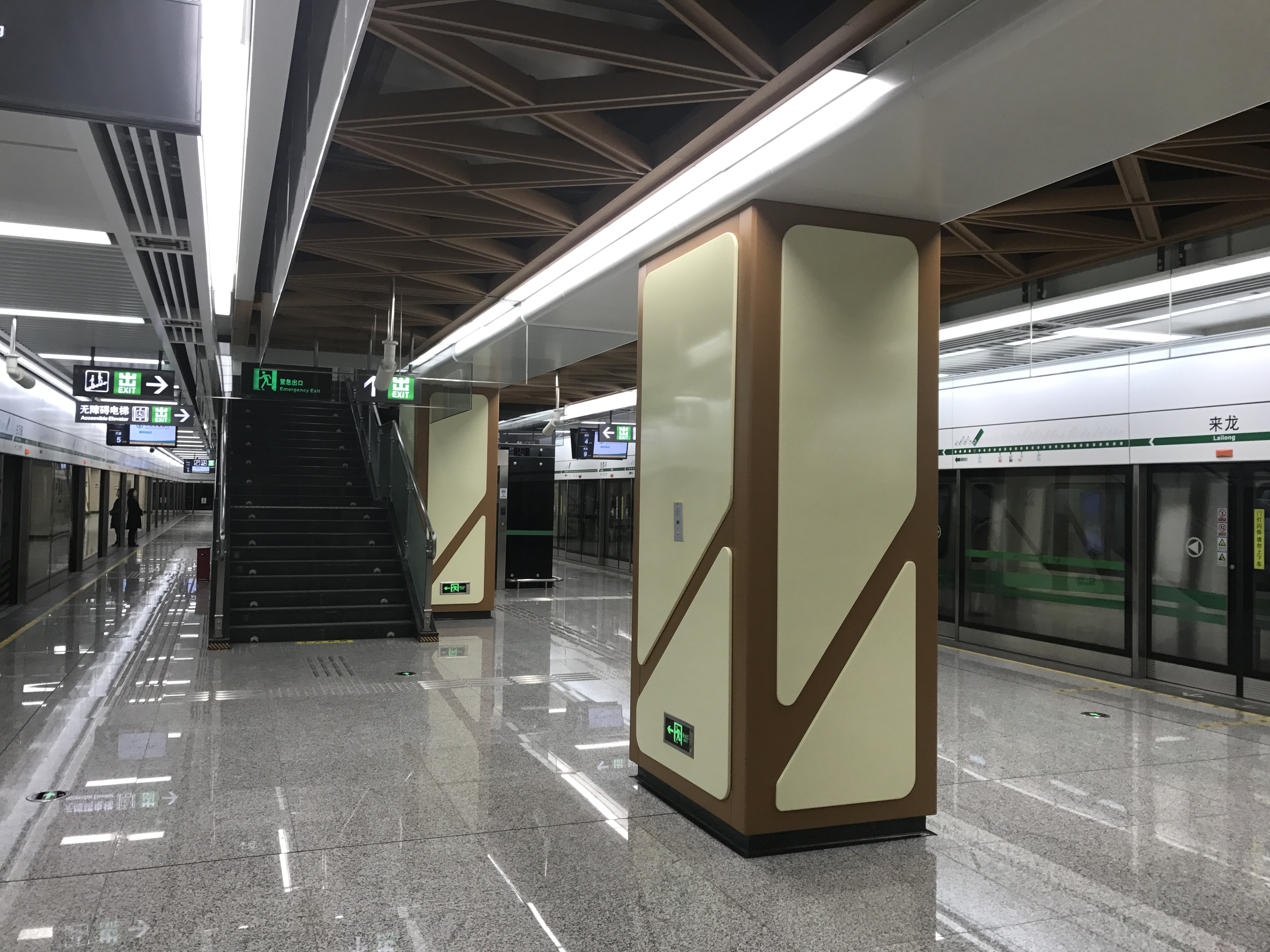
Platform
