= Wannianchang station =

Metro station in Chengdu, China

Coordinates: 30.6466°N 104.1165°E

Wannianchang 万年场
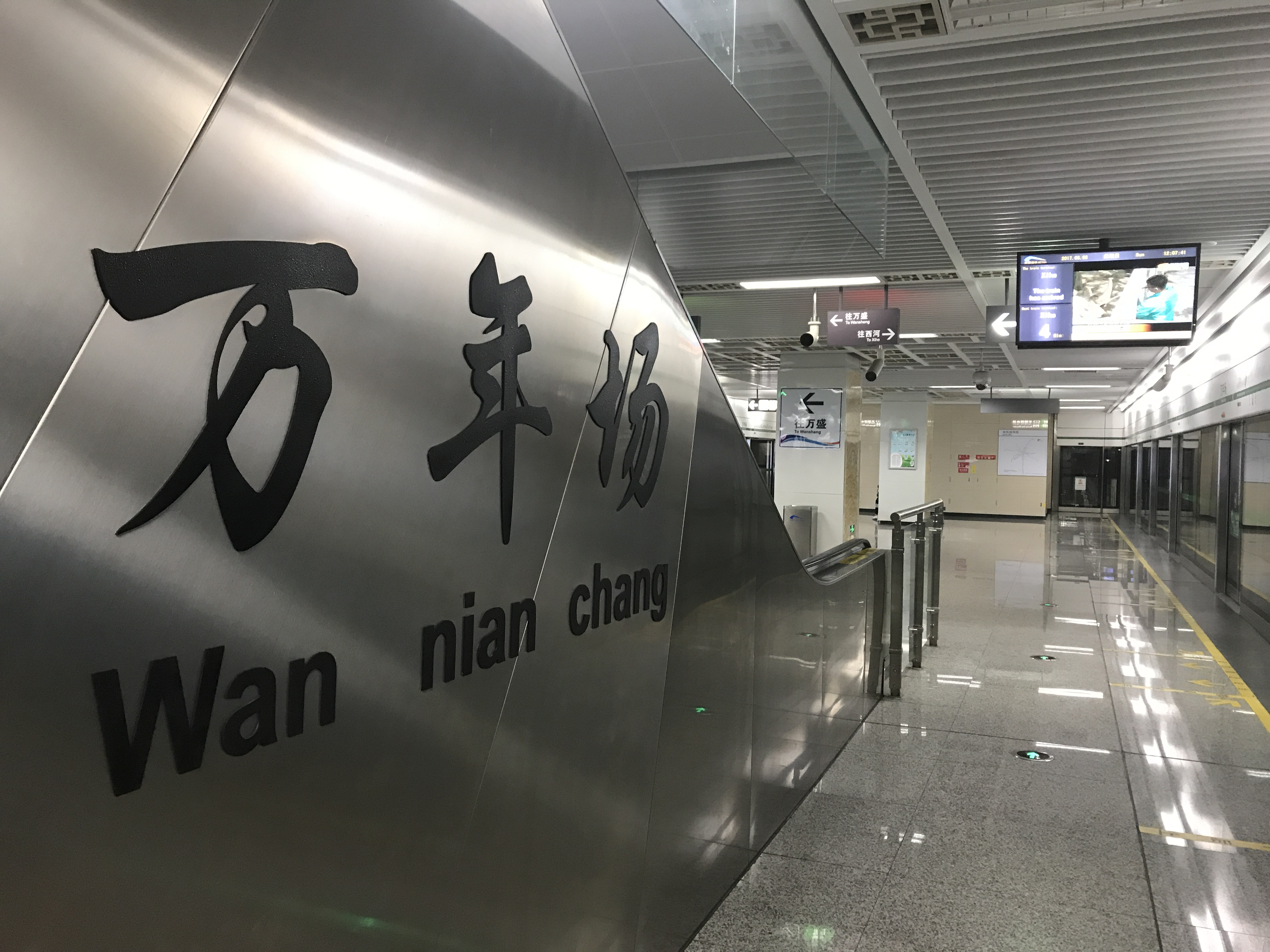

General information
- Location: Chenghua District, Chengdu, Sichuan; China
- Operated by: Chengdu Metro Limited
- Line(s): Line 4
- Platforms: 2 (1 island platform)

Other information
- Station code: 0407

History
- Opened: 26 December 2015

Services
Preceding station	Chengdu Metro	Following station
Shuangqiao Road towards Wansheng	Line 4	Huaishudian towards Xihe

Wannianchang (Chinese: 万年场) is a station on Line 4 of the Chengdu Metro in China.

== Station layout ==
G	Entrances and Exits	Exits A-F
B1	Concourse	Faregates, Station Agent
B2	Westbound	← Line 4 towards Wansheng (Shuangqiao Road)
B2	Island platform, doors open on the left
B2	Easthbound	Line 4 towards Xihe (Huaishudian) →

== Gallery ==
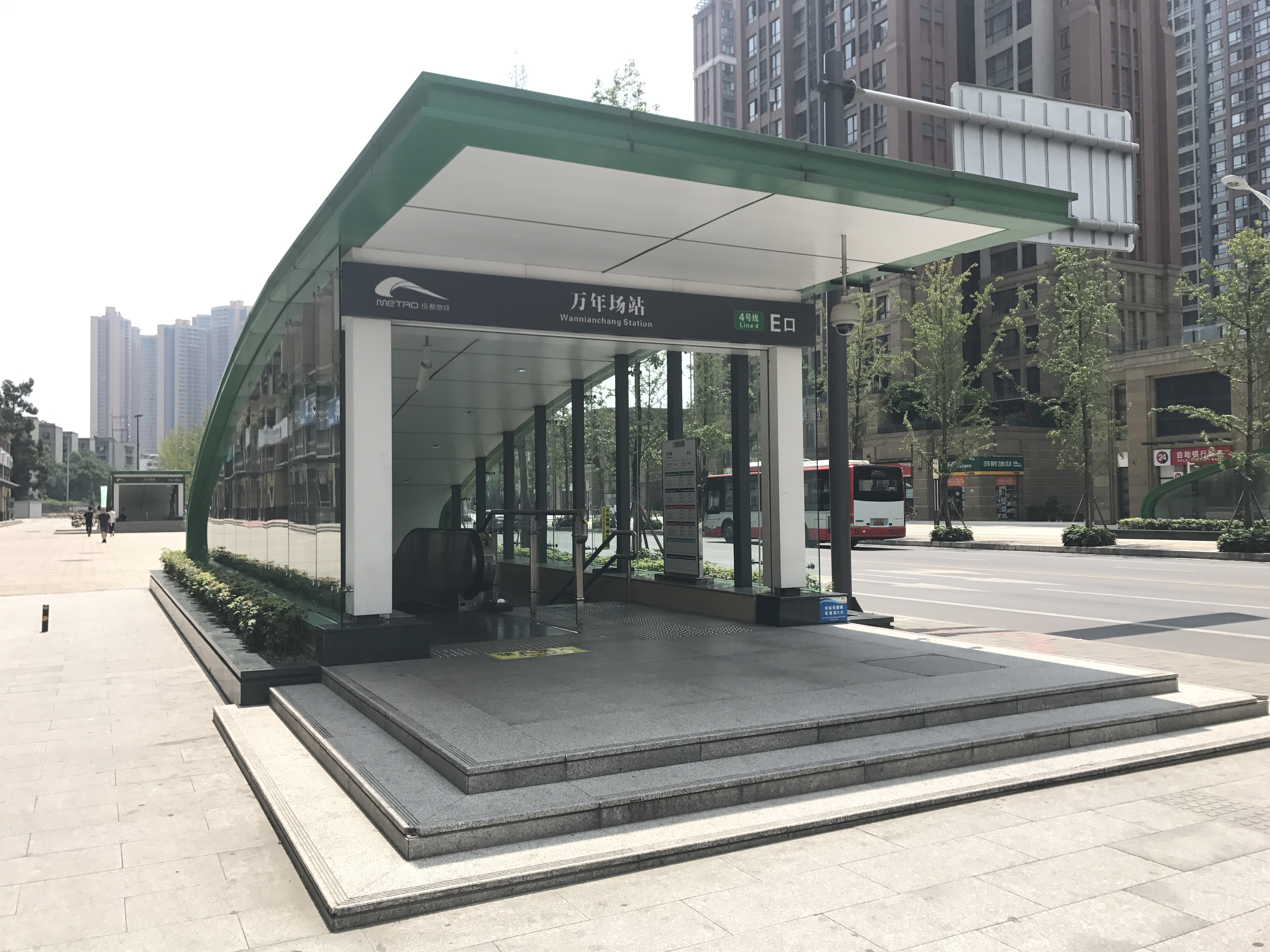
Entrance E

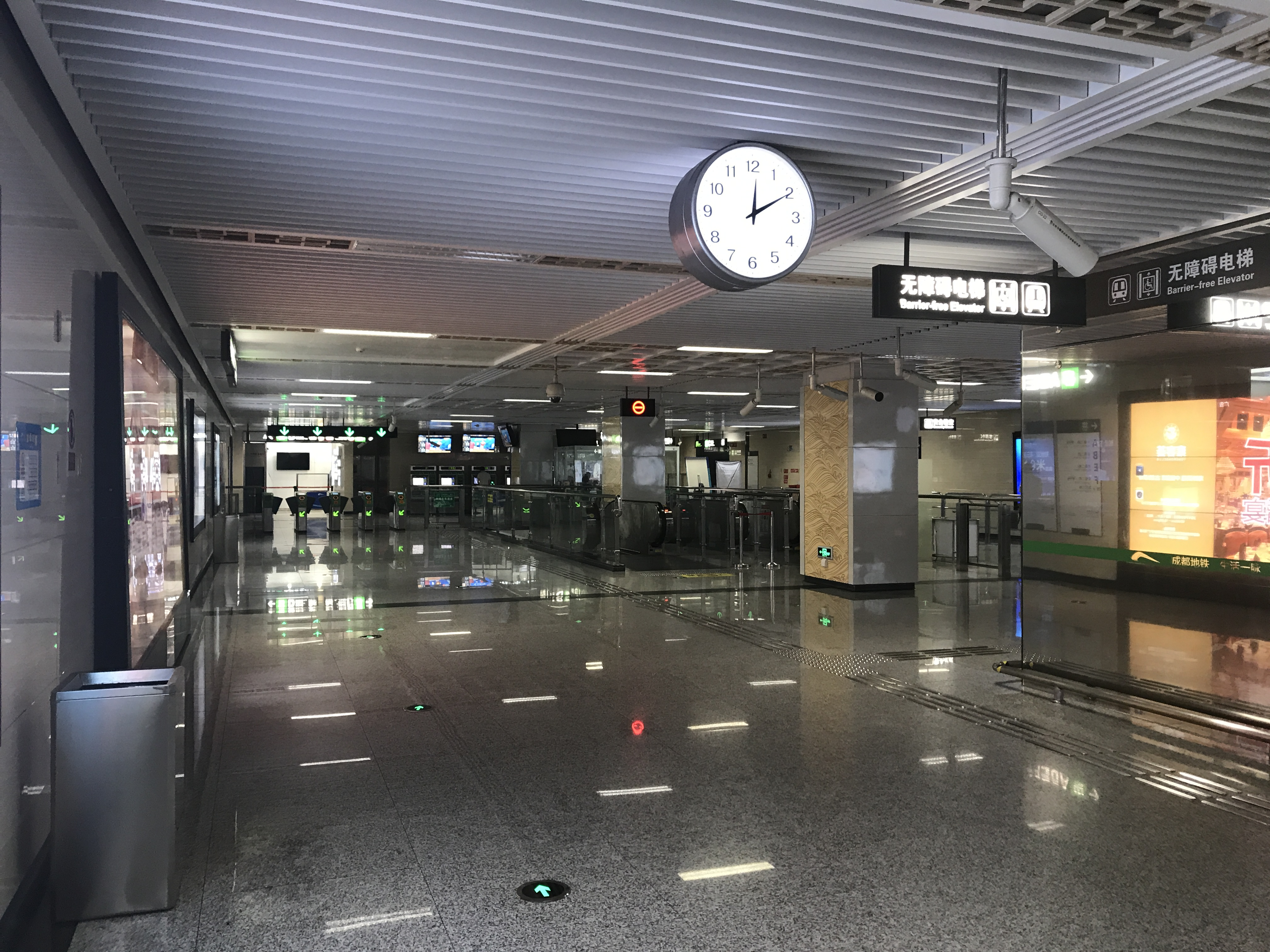
Concourse

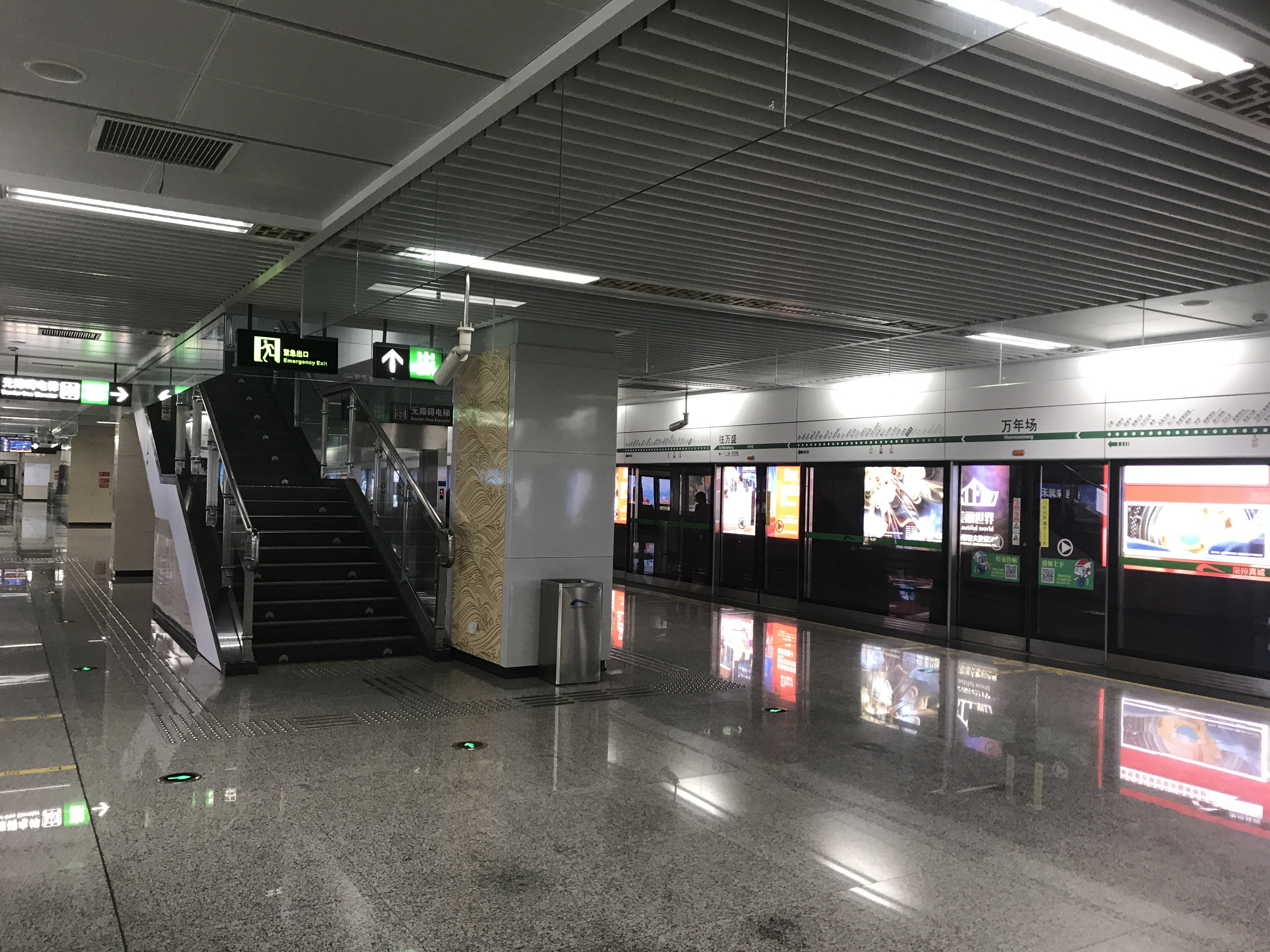
Platform
