= Dongjiao Memory station =

Metro station in Chengdu, China

Dongjiao Memory 东郊记忆
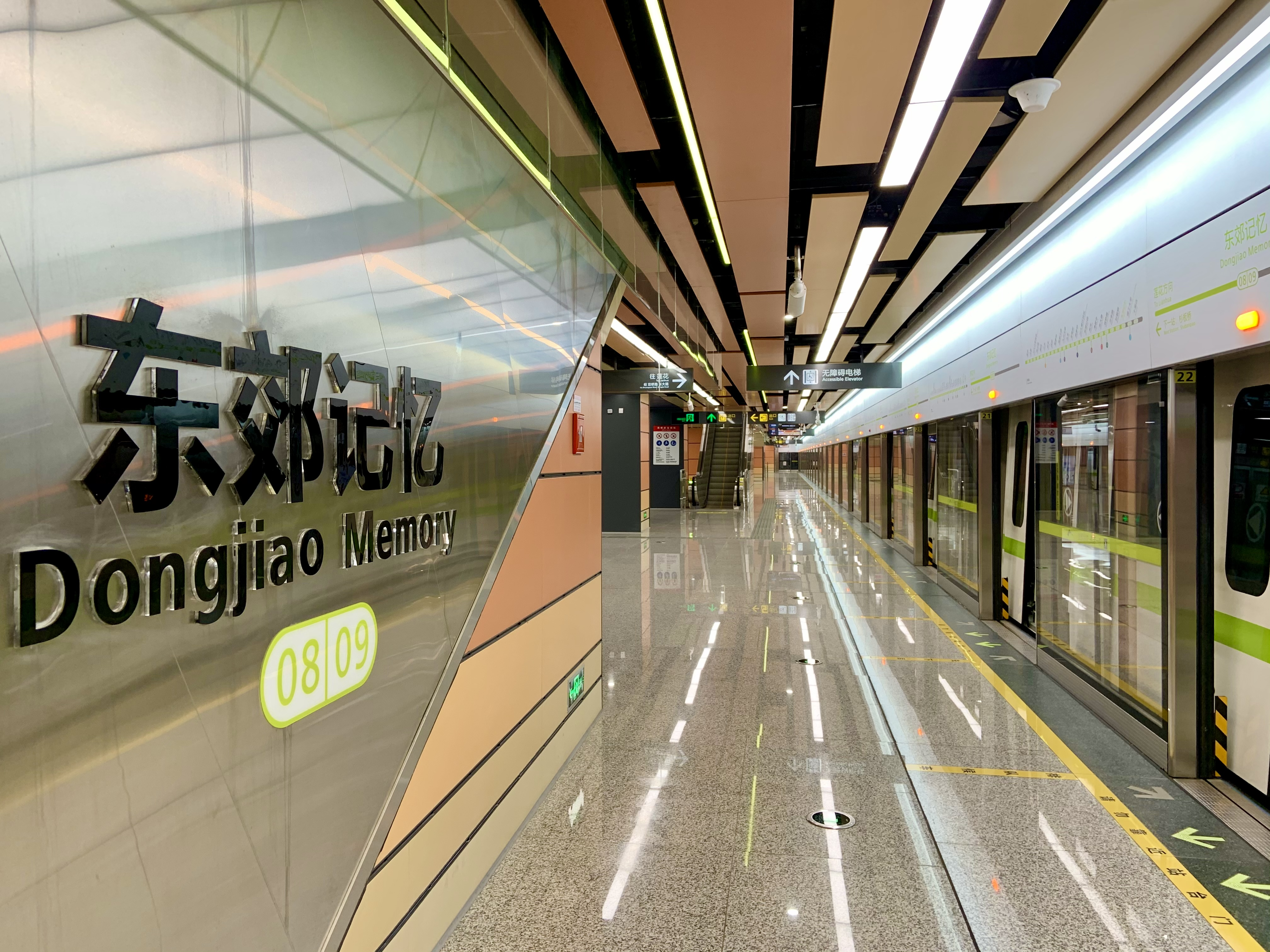

General information
- Location: Chenghua District, Chengdu, Sichuan; China
- Operator: Chengdu Metro Limited
- Line: Line 8
- Platforms: 2 (1 island platform)

Other information
- Station code: 0809

History
- Opened: 18 December 2020

Services
Preceding station	Chengdu Metro	Following station
Chengdu University of Technology towards Guilong Road	Line 8	Shabanqiao towards Longgang
Location

Dongjiao Memory station (Chinese: 东郊记忆站; pinyin: Dōngjiāo Jìyì zhàn) is a metro station at Chengdu, Sichuan, China. It was opened on December 18, 2020, with the opening of Chengdu Metro Line 8. The station serves the Dongjiao Memory area.

== Gallery ==
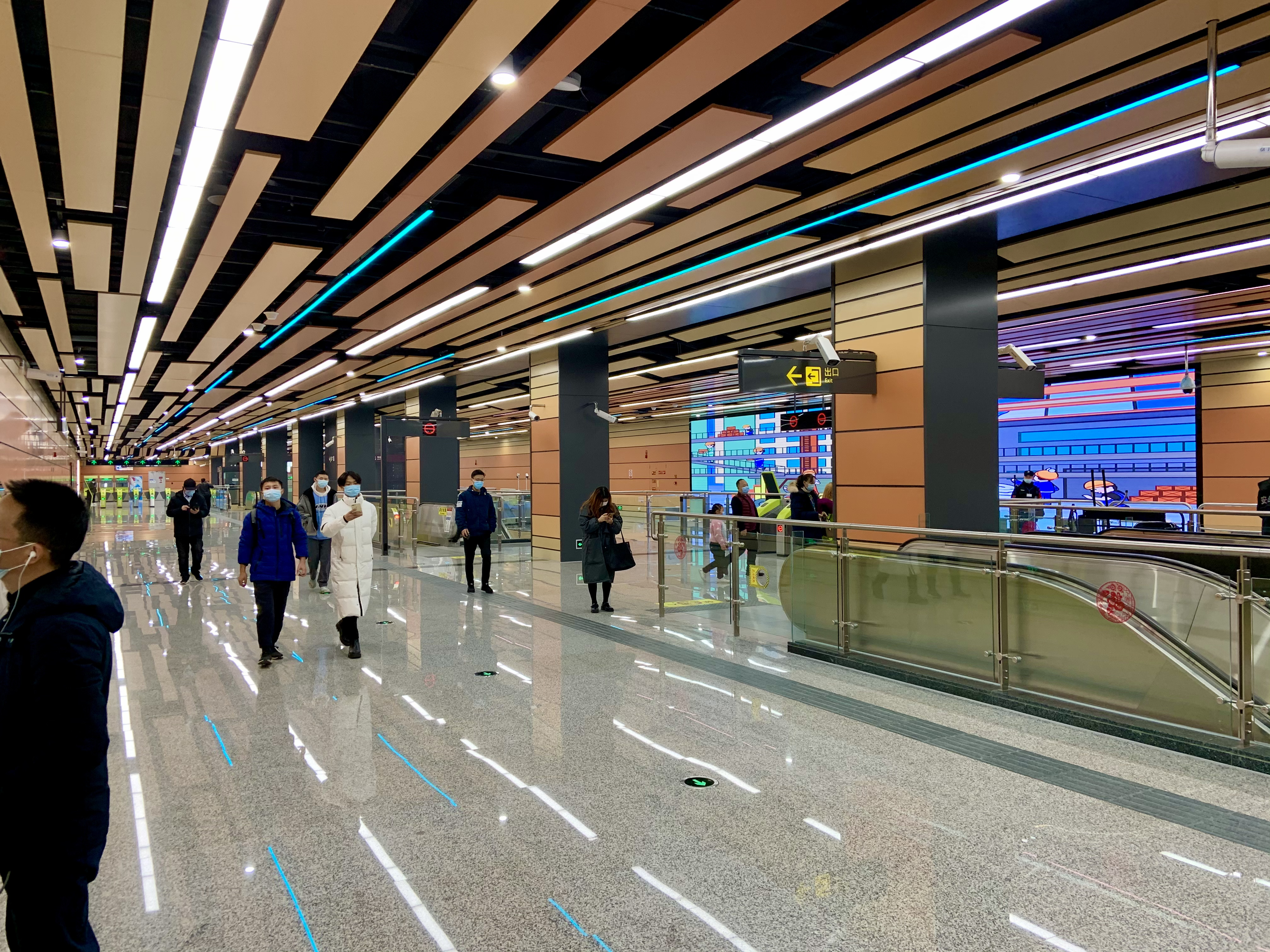
Concourse

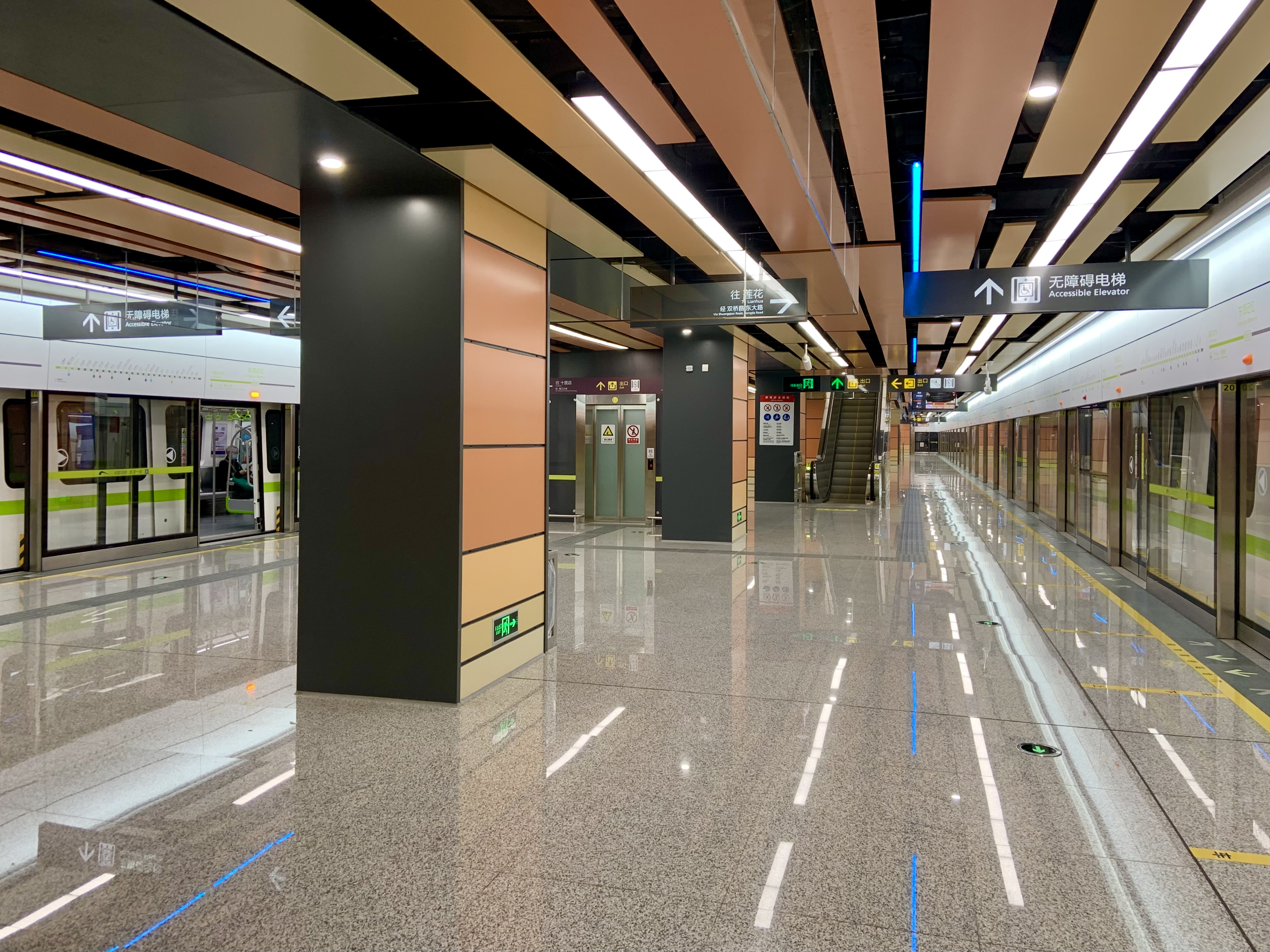
Platform
