= Huaishudian station =

Chengdu Metro transfer station

Huaishudian 槐树店
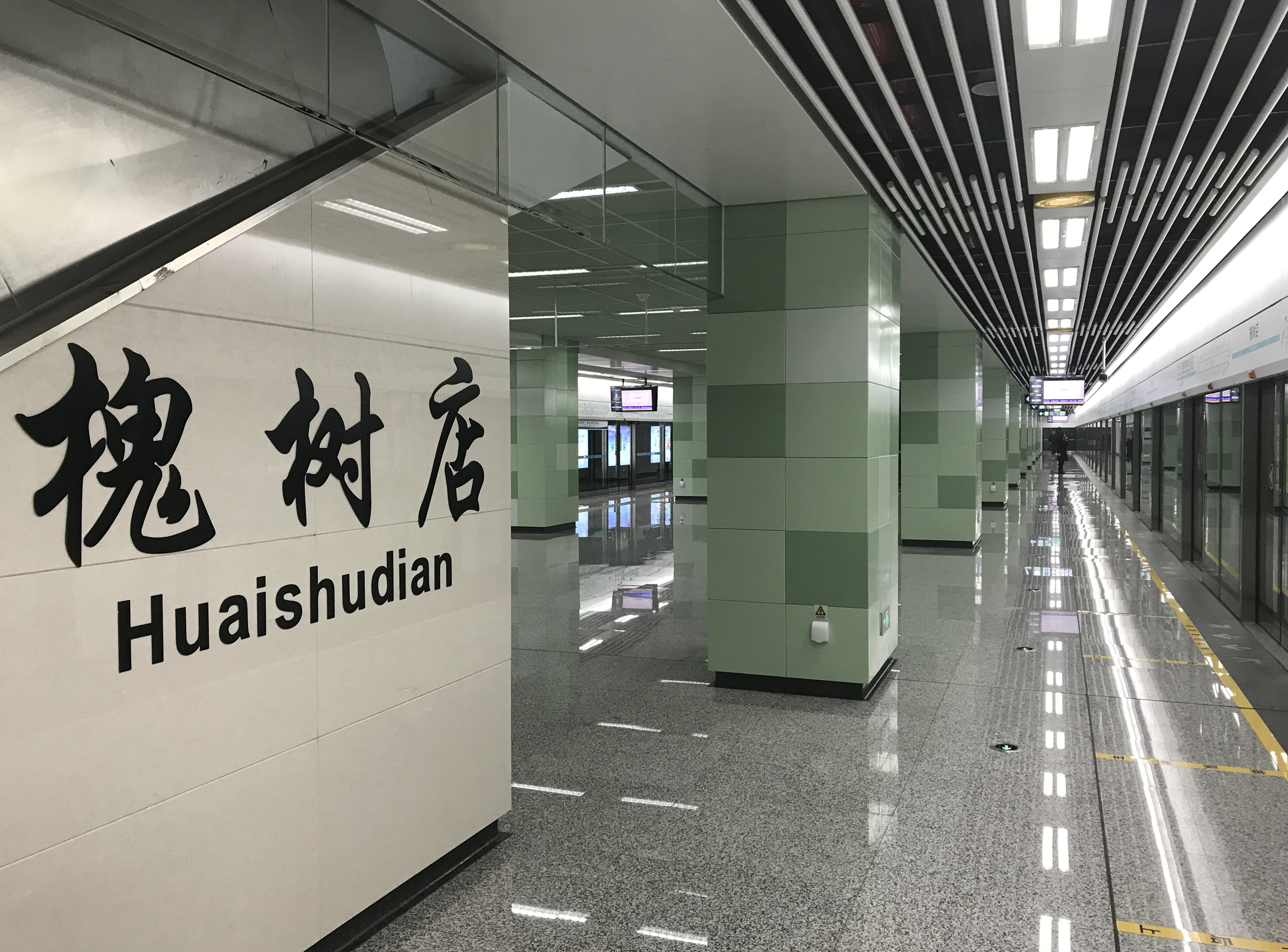

General information
- Location: Chenghua District, Chengdu, Sichuan; China
- Operator: Chengdu Metro Limited
- Lines: Line 4 Line 7
- Platforms: 4 (2 island platforms)

Other information
- Station code: 0406 0724

History
- Opened: 2 June 2017

Services
Preceding station	Chengdu Metro	Following station
Wannianchang towards Wansheng	Line 4	Lailong towards Xihe
Yinghui Road Clockwise	Line 7	Shuangdian Road Anticlockwise
Location

Huaishudian (Chinese: 槐树店) is a transfer station on Line 4 and Line 7 of the Chengdu Metro in China. It was opened on 2 June 2017.

== Station layout ==
G	Entrances and Exits	Exits A-C, E-G, K
B1	Concourse	Faregates, Station Agent
B2	Clockwise	← Line 7 to Yinghui Road
B2	Island platform, doors open on the left
B2	Counterclockwise	Line 7 to Shuangdian Road →
B3	Westbound	← Line 4 towards Wansheng (Wannianchang)
B3	Island platform, doors open on the left
B3	Eastbound	Line 4 towards Xihe (Lailong) →

== Gallery ==
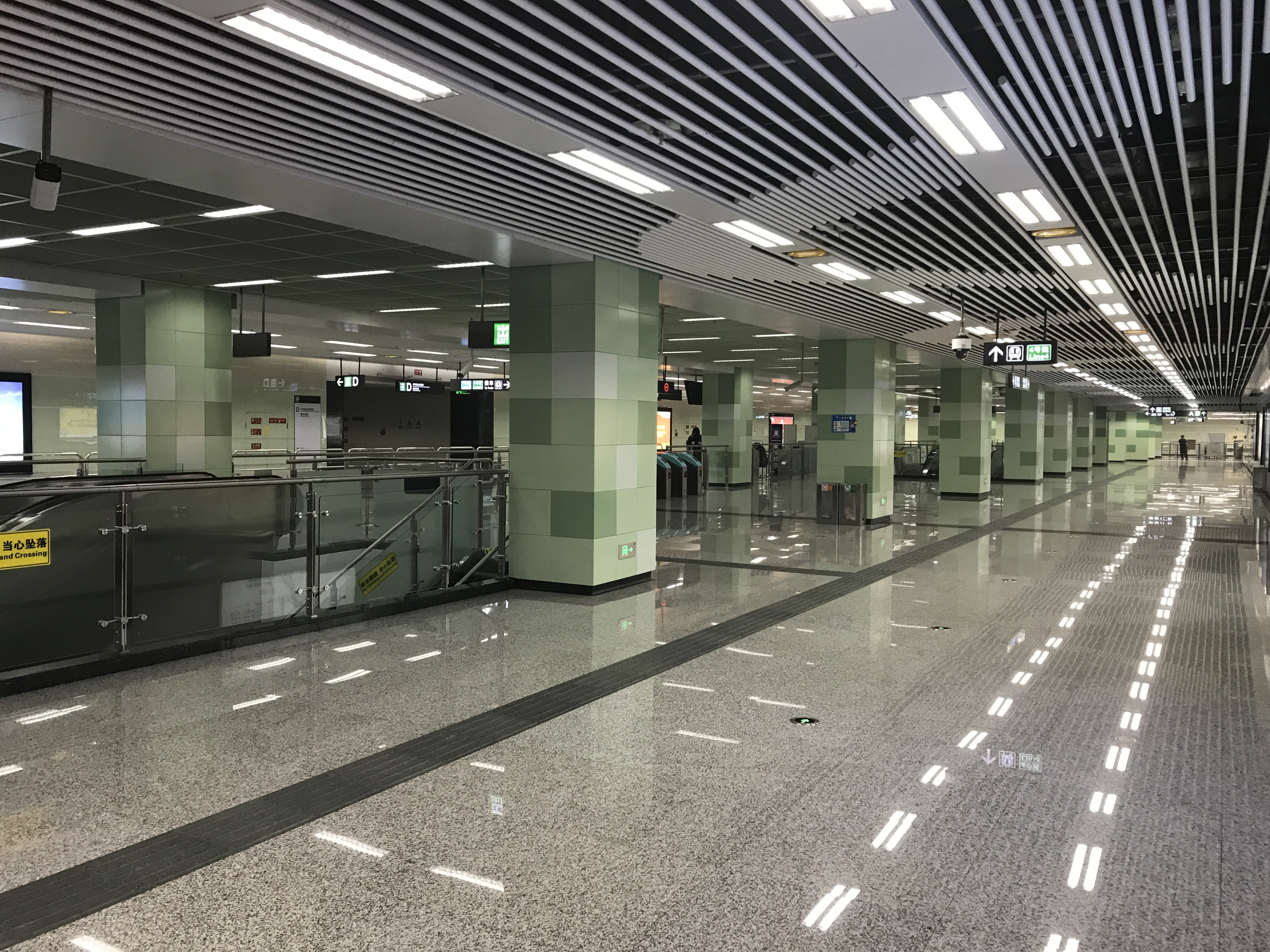
Concourse

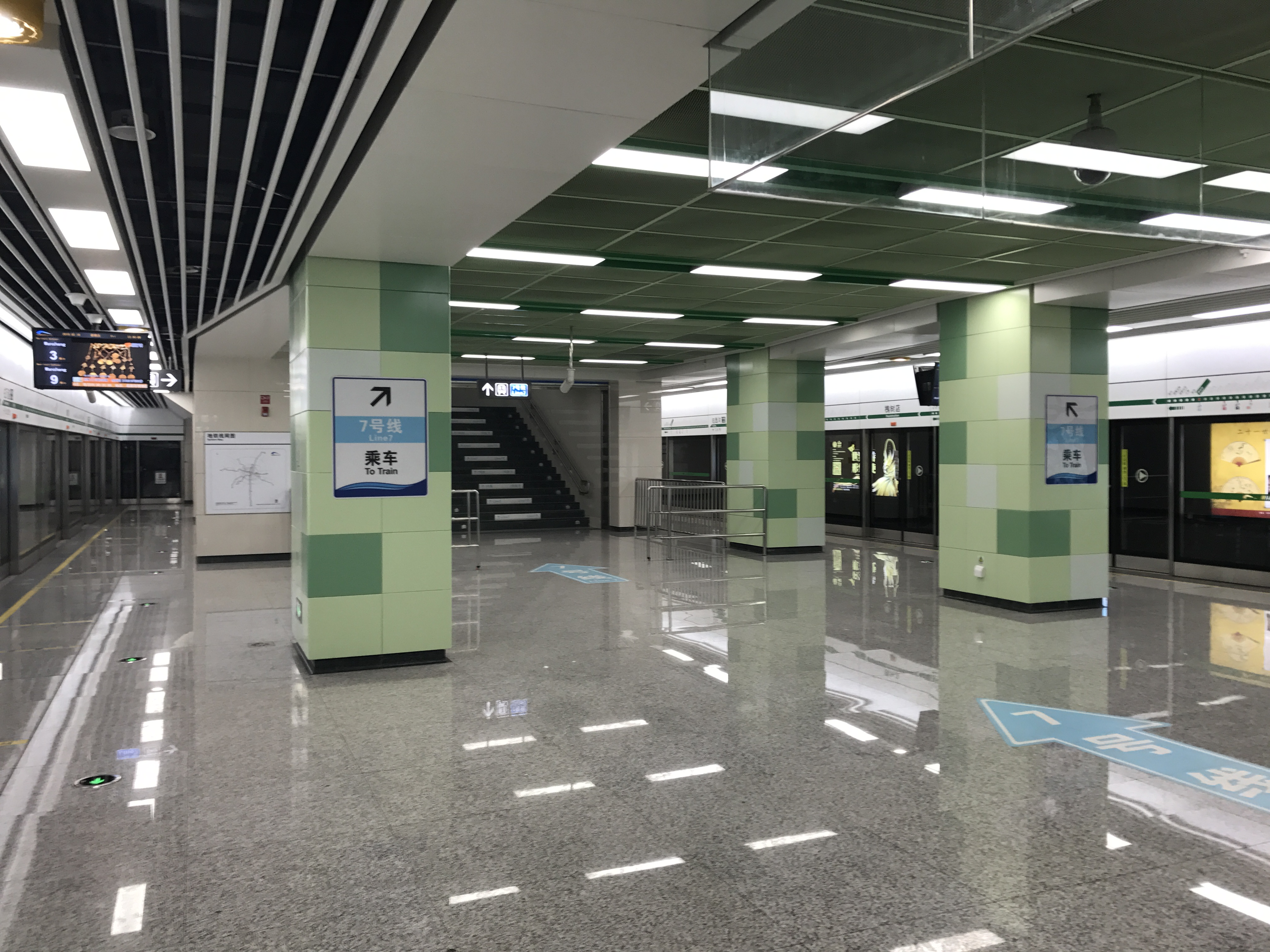
Line 4 platform

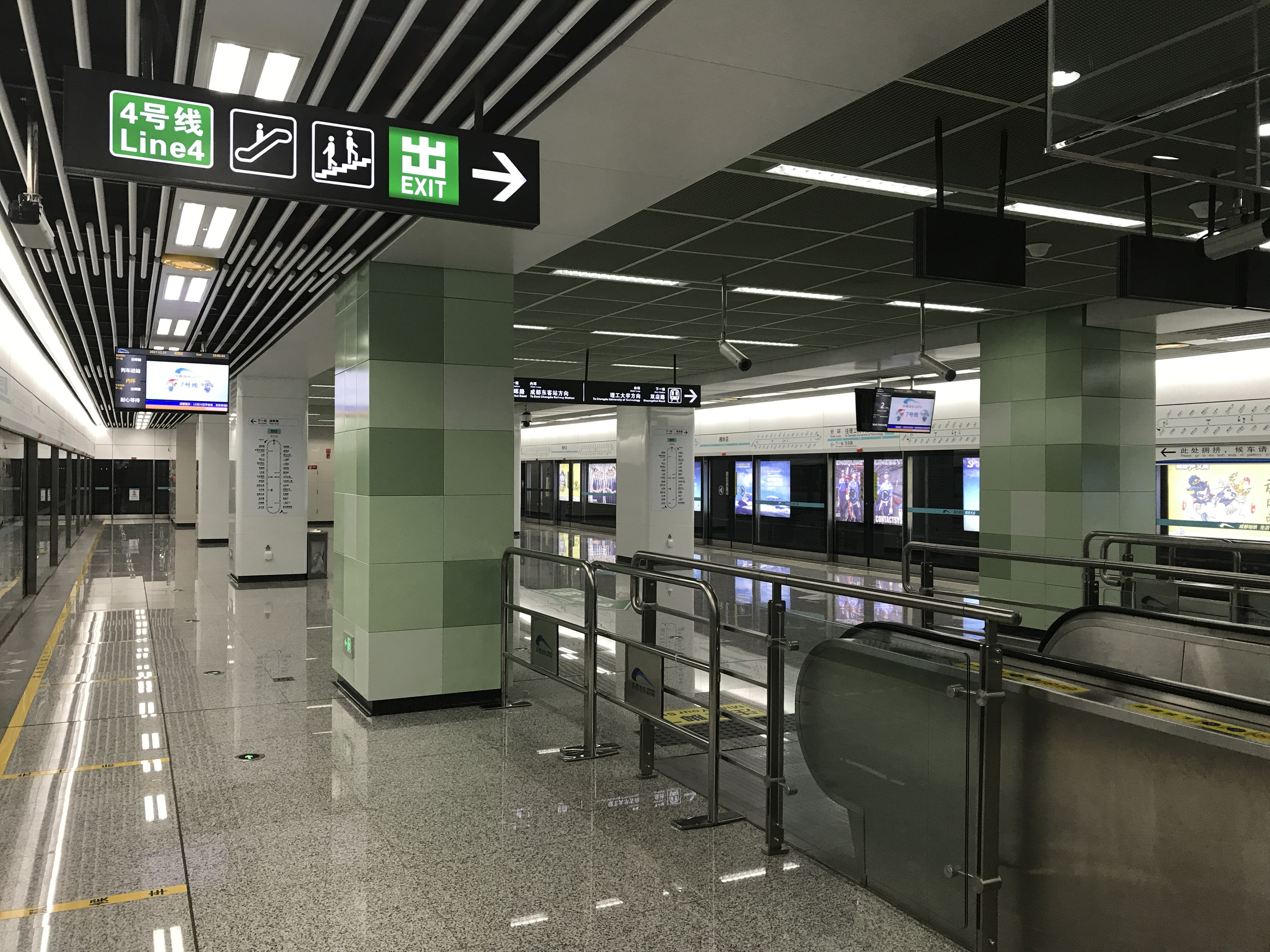
Line 7 platform
