= Shabanqiao station =

Metro station in Chengdu, China

Shabanqiao 杉板桥
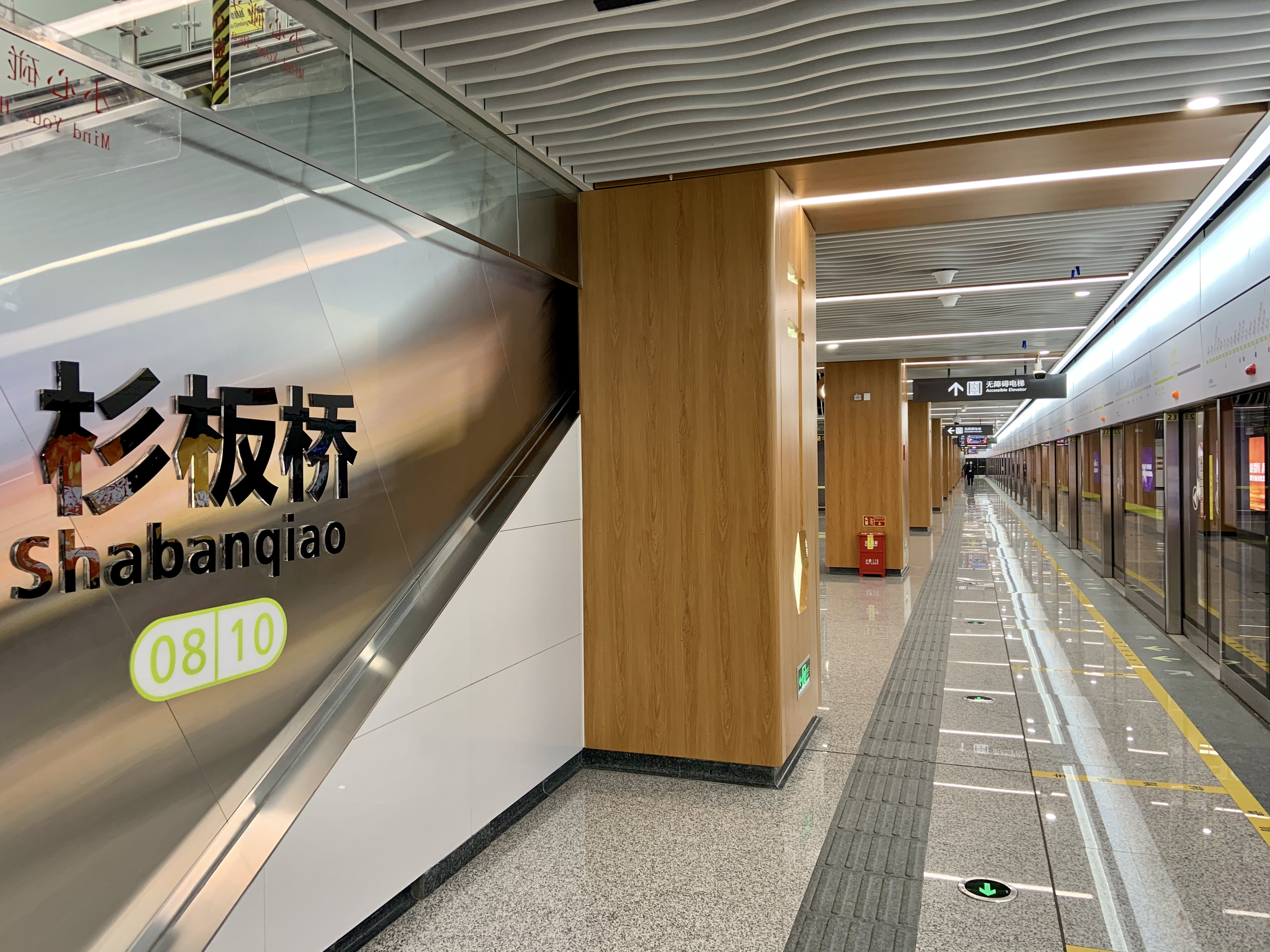

General information
- Location: Chenghua District, Chengdu, Sichuan; China
- Coordinates: 30.66651°N 104.11671°E
- Operated by: Chengdu Metro Limited
- Line: Line 8
- Platforms: 2 (1 island platform)

Other information
- Station code: 0810

History
- Opened: 18 December 2020

Services
Preceding station	Chengdu Metro	Following station
Dongjiao Memory towards Guilong Road	Line 8	Wannian Road towards Longgang
Location

Shabanqiao station (Chinese: 杉板桥站; pinyin: Shābǎnqiáo zhàn) is a metro station at Chengdu, Sichuan, China. It was opened on December 18, 2020 with the opening of Chengdu Metro Line 8.

== Gallery ==
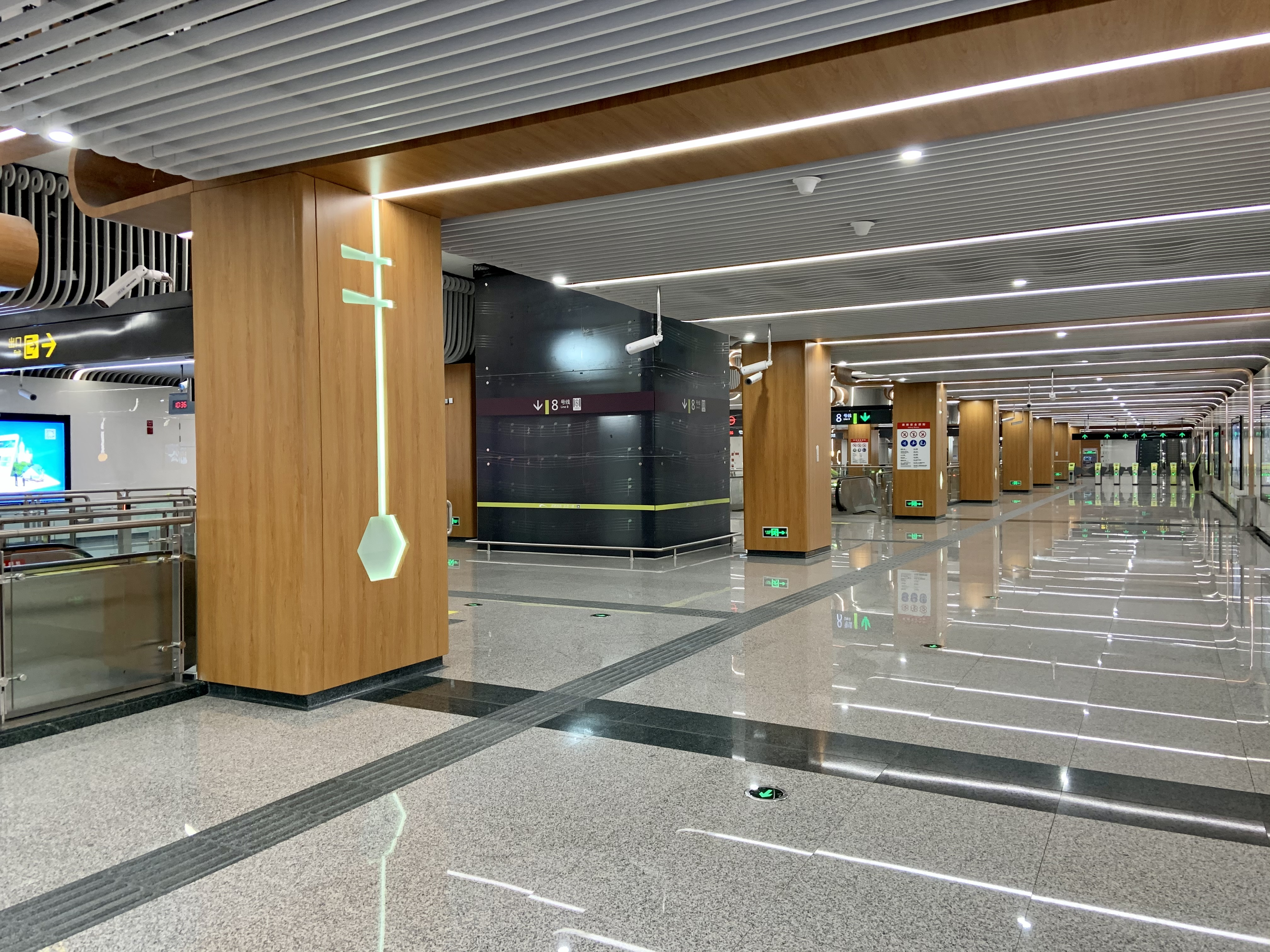
Concourse

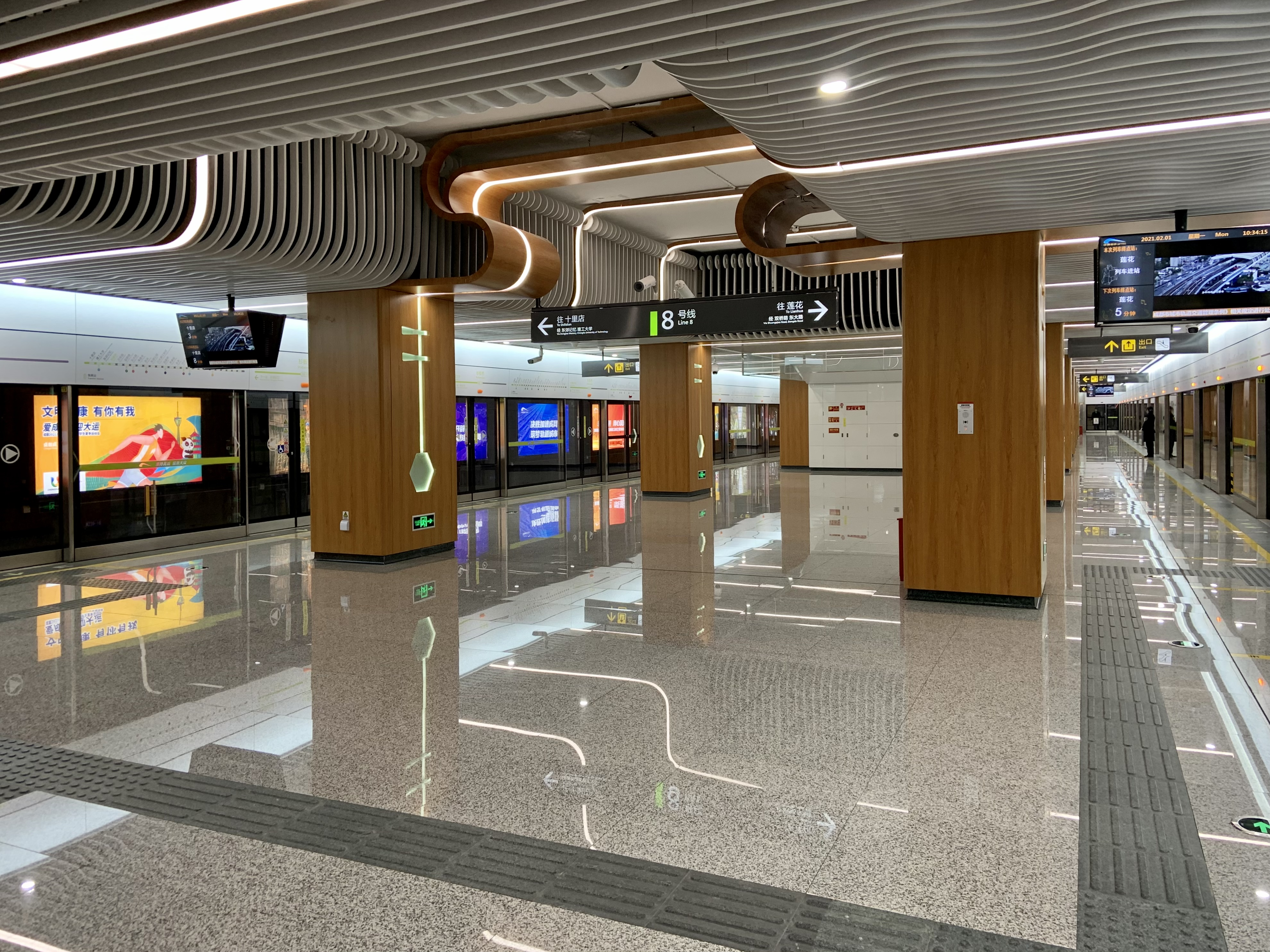
Platform
