= Chengdu University station =

Metro station in Chengdu, China

Chengdu University 成都大学
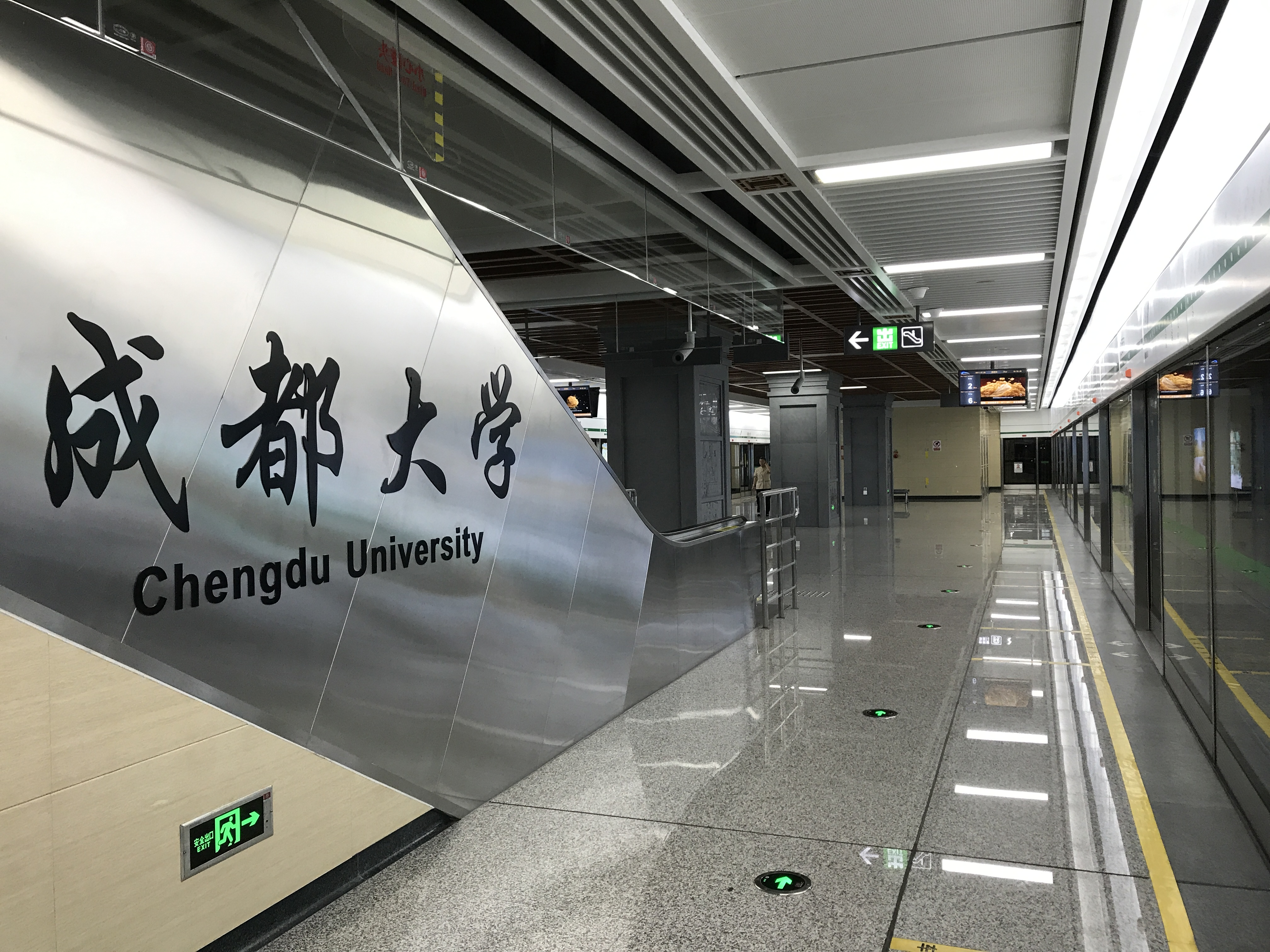

General information
- Location: Longquanyi District, Chengdu, Sichuan; China
- Coordinates: 30.64686°N 104.18108°E
- Operator: Chengdu Metro Limited
- Line: Line 4
- Platforms: 2 (1 island platform)

Other information
- Station code: 0403

History
- Opened: 2 June 2017

Services
Preceding station	Chengdu Metro	Following station
Shiling towards Wansheng	Line 4	Mingshuwangling towards Xihe
Location

Chengdu University (Chinese: 成都大学) is a station on Line 4 of the Chengdu Metro in China. The station serves the nearby Chengdu University.

== Station layout ==
G	Entrances and Exits	Exits B-D
B1	Concourse	Faregates, Station Agent
B2	Westbound	← Line 4 towards Wansheng (Shiling)
B2	Island platform, doors open on the left
B2	Easthbound	Line 4 towards Xihe (Mingshuwangling) →

== Gallery ==
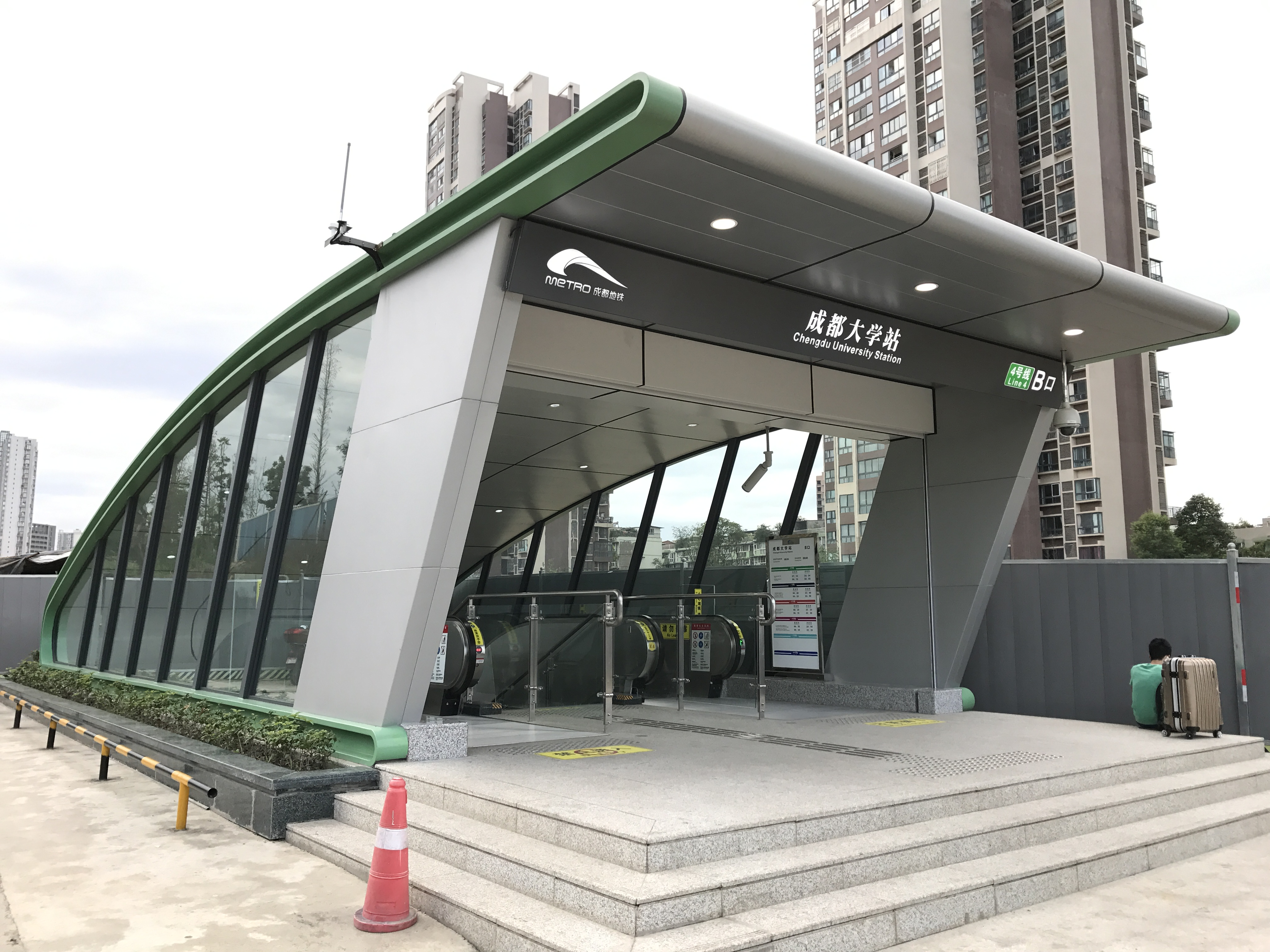
Entrance B

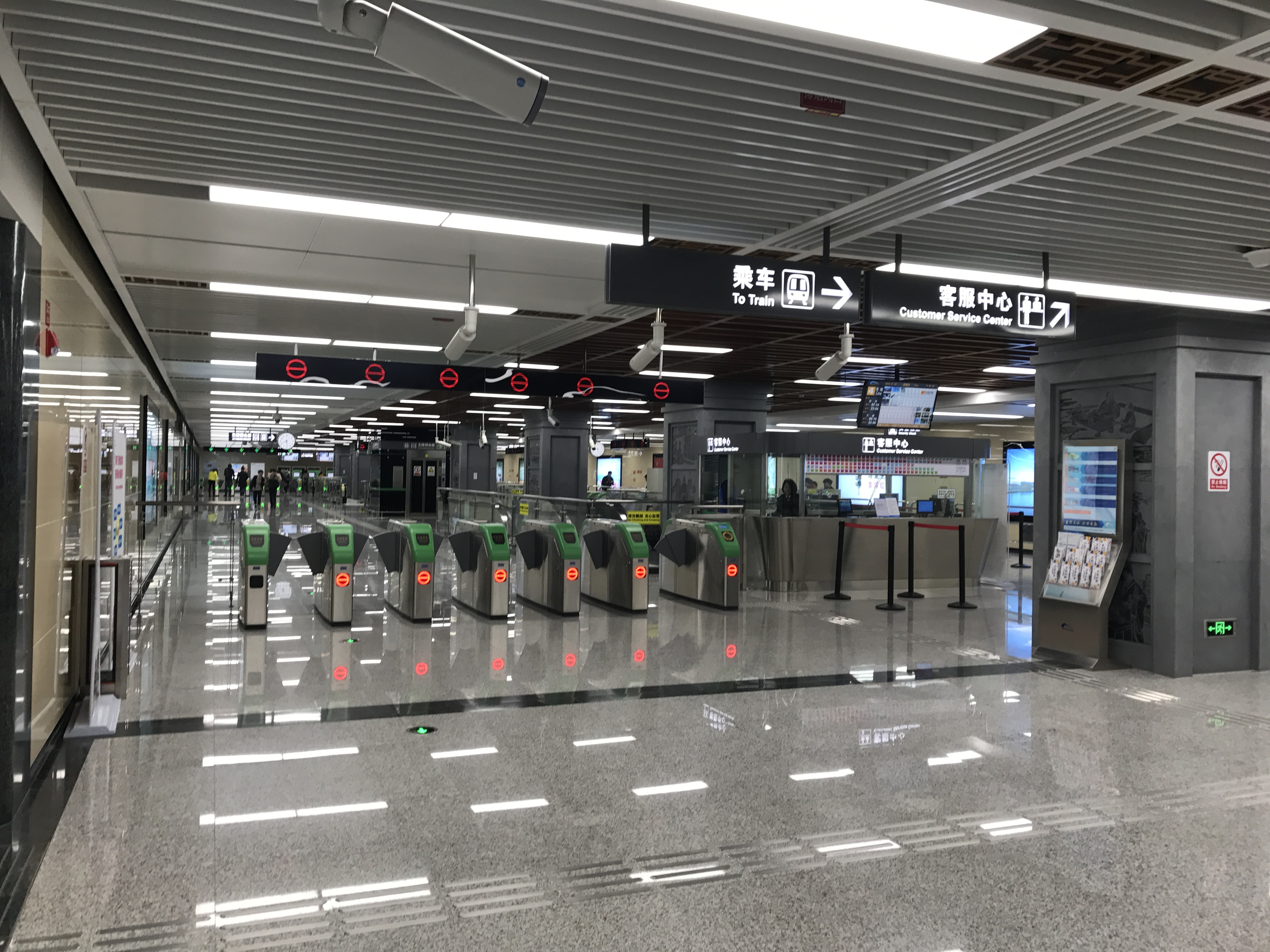
Concourse

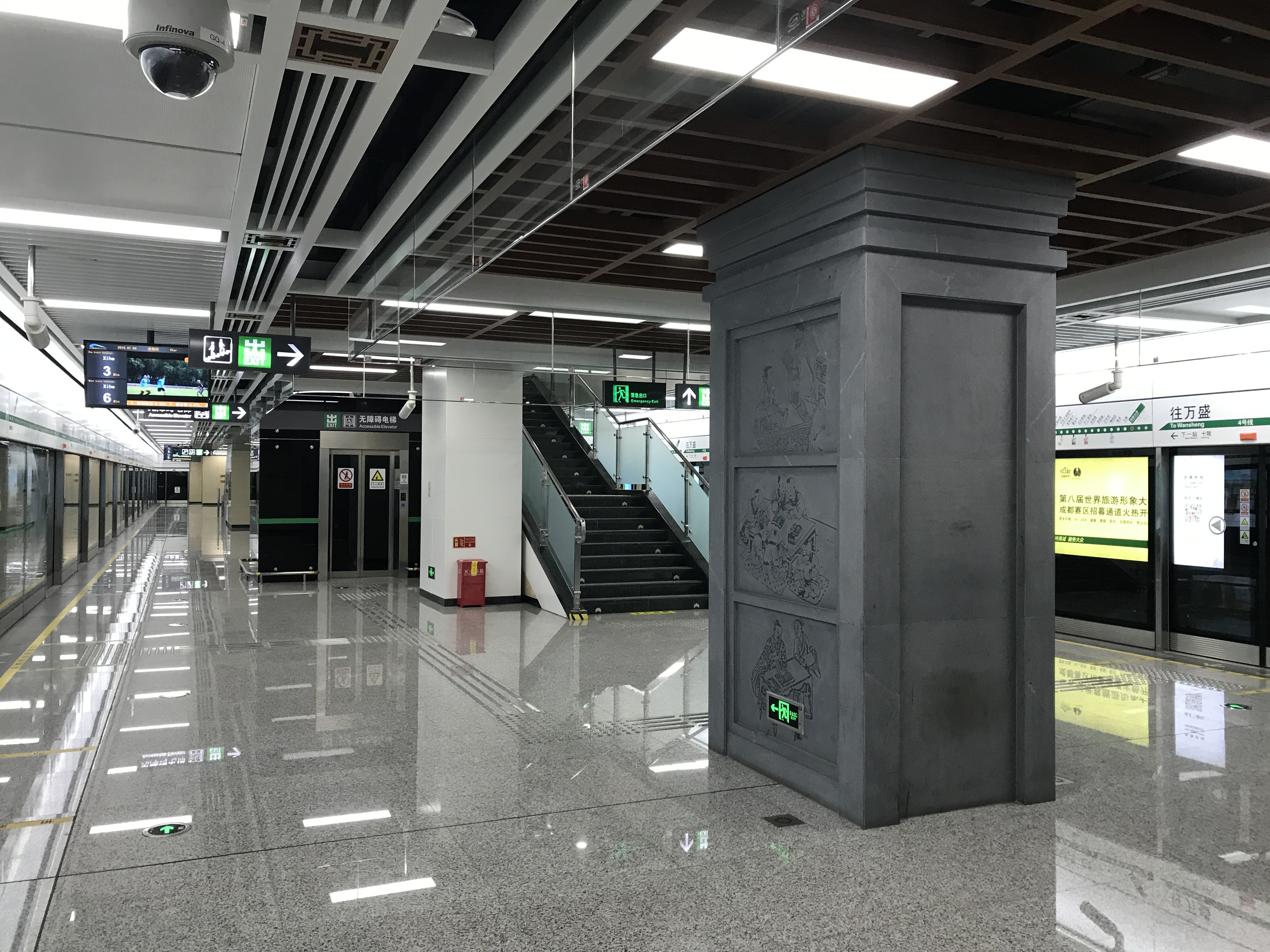
Platform
