= Shenxianshu station =

Chengdu Metro station

Shenxianshu 神仙树
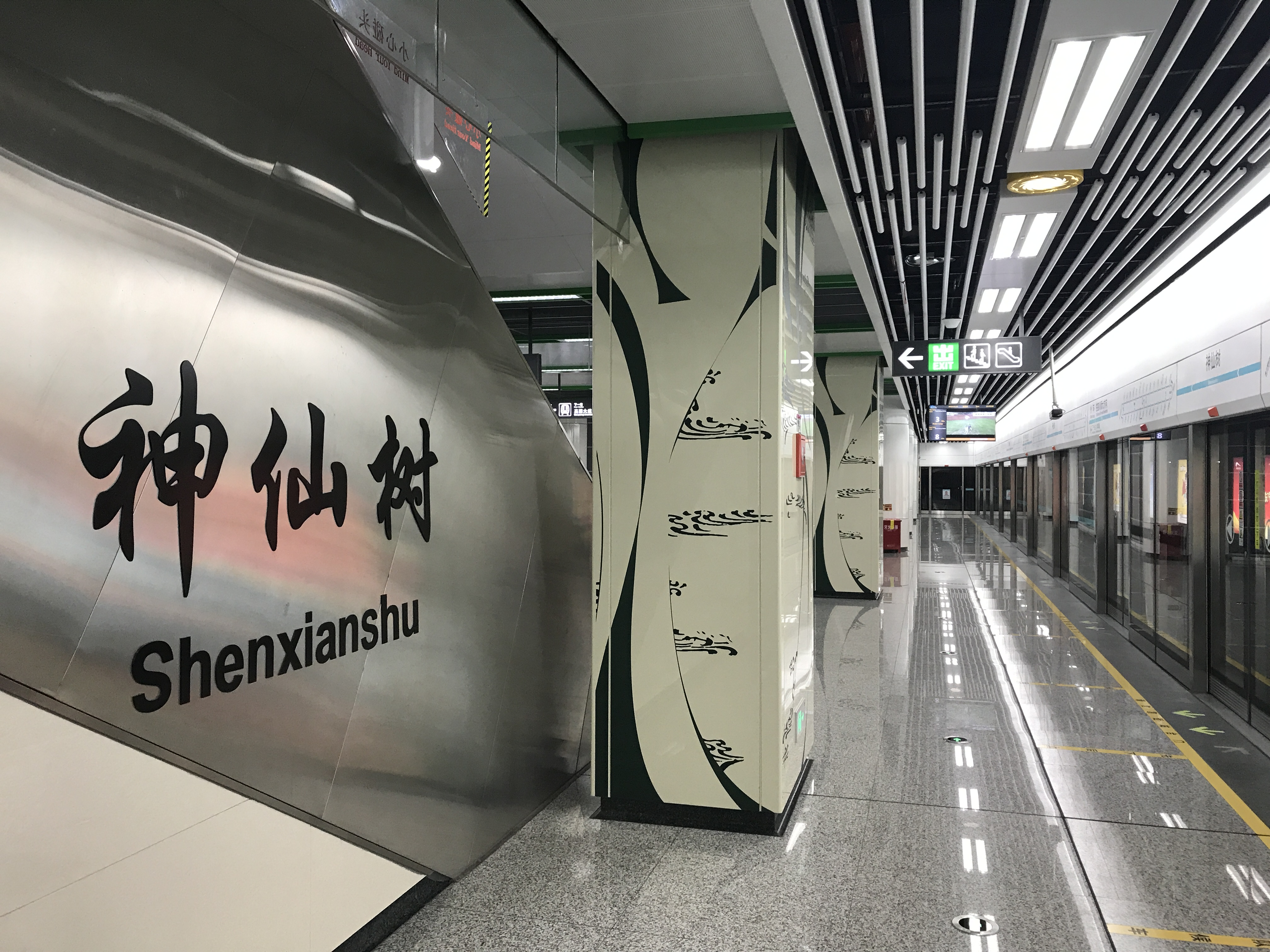

General information
- Location: Wuhou District, Chengdu, Sichuan; China
- Operator: Chengdu Metro Limited
- Lines: Line 5 Line 7
- Platforms: 4 (2 island platforms)

Other information
- Station code: 0527 0715

History
- Opened: 6 December 2017

Services
Preceding station	Chengdu Metro	Following station
Jiuxing Avenue towards Huagui Road	Line 5	Shiyang Flyover towards Huilong
Gaopeng Avenue Clockwise	Line 7	South Railway Station Anticlockwise
Location

Shenxianshu station (Chinese: 神仙树站; pinyin: Shénxiānshù zhàn) is a transfer station on Line 5 and Line 7 of the Chengdu Metro in China. It was opened on 6 December 2017.

== Station layout ==
G	Entrances and Exits	Exits A, C-F
B1	Concourse	Faregates, Station Agent
B2	Concourse	Faregates, Station Agent
B3	Northbound	← Line 5 to Huagui Road (Jiuxing Avenue)
B3	Island platform, doors open on the left
B3	Southbound	Line 5 to Huilong (Shiyang Flyover) →
B4	Clockwise	← Line 7 to Cuijiadian (Gaopeng Avenue)
B4	Island platform, doors open on the left
B4	Counterclockwise	Line 7 to Cuijiadian (South Railway Station) →

== Gallery ==
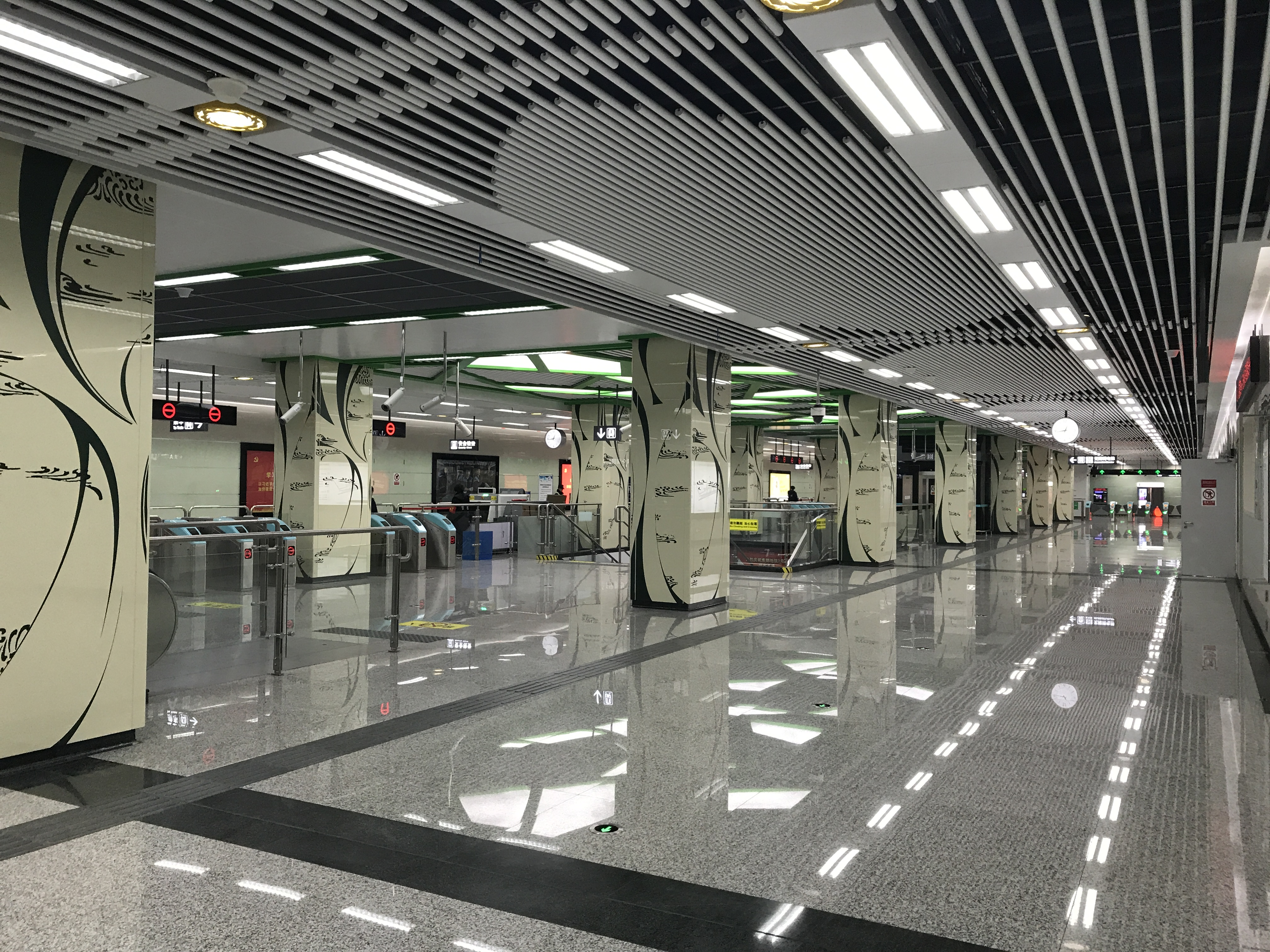
Concourse

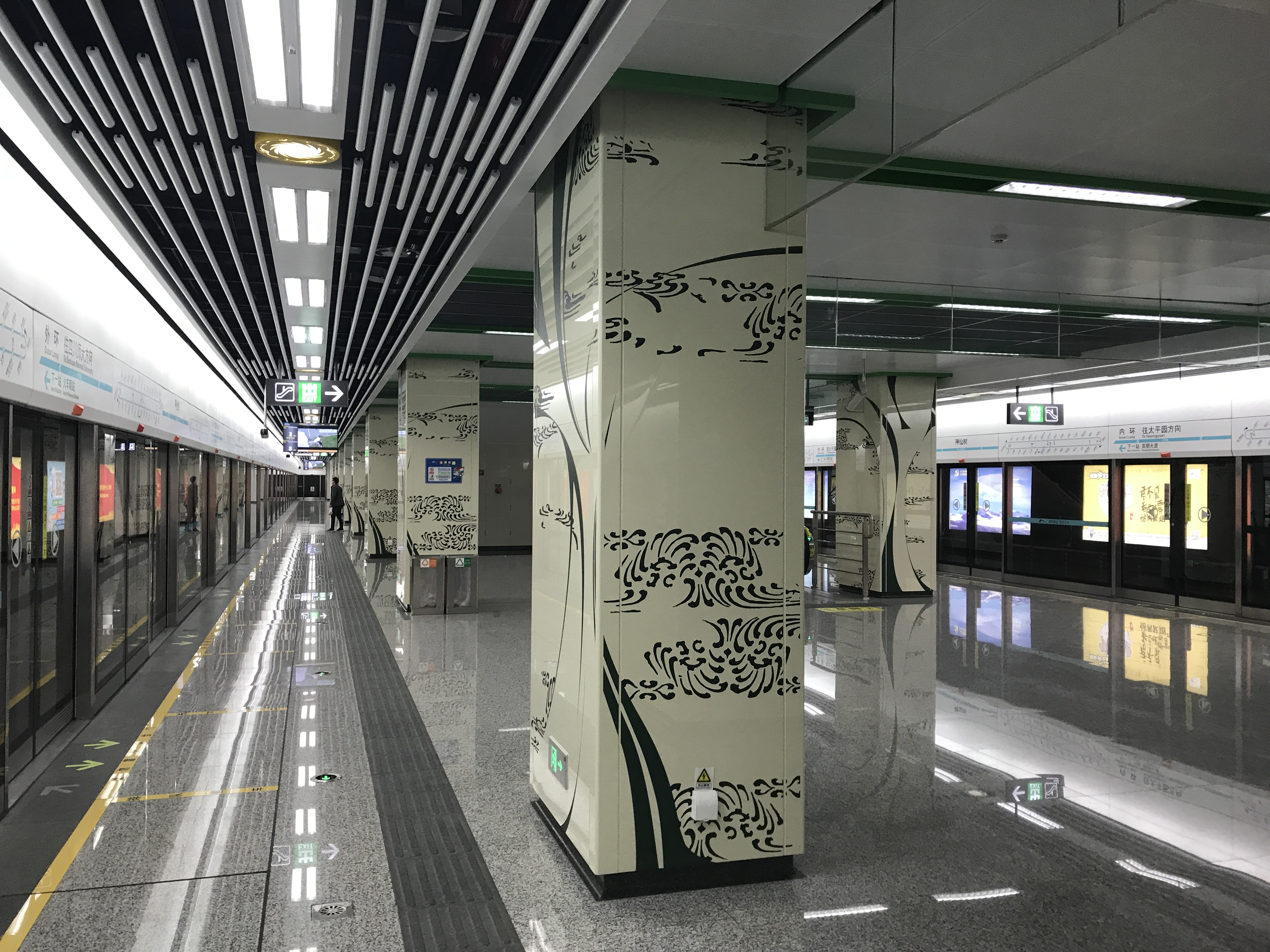
Line 7 platform
