= Jiuxing Avenue station =

Chinese metro station

Jiuxing Avenue 九兴大道
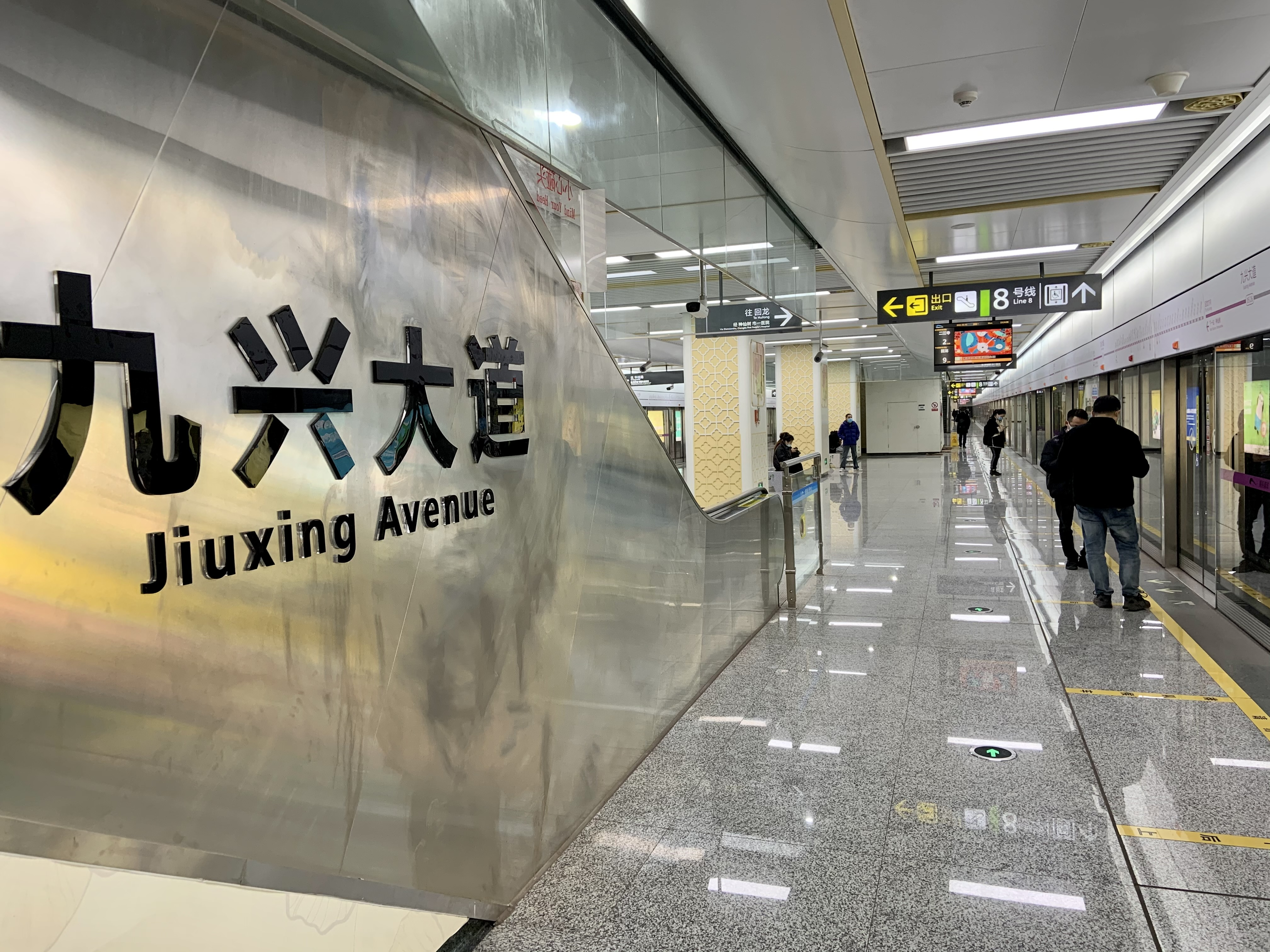
- Line 5 platform

General information
- Location: Wuhou, Chengdu, Sichuan; China
- Operated by: Chengdu Metro Limited
- Lines: Line 5 Line 8
- Platforms: 4 (2 island platforms)

Other information
- Station code: 0526 0821

History
- Opened: 27 December 2019

Services
Preceding station	Chengdu Metro	Following station
Keyuan towards Huagui Road	Line 5	Shenxianshu towards Huilong
Yongfeng towards Guilong Road	Line 8	Gaopeng Avenue towards Longgang
Location

Jiuxing Avenue (Chinese: 九兴大道) is a station on Line 5 and Line 8 of the Chengdu Metro in China. It was opened on 27 December 2019.

== Gallery ==
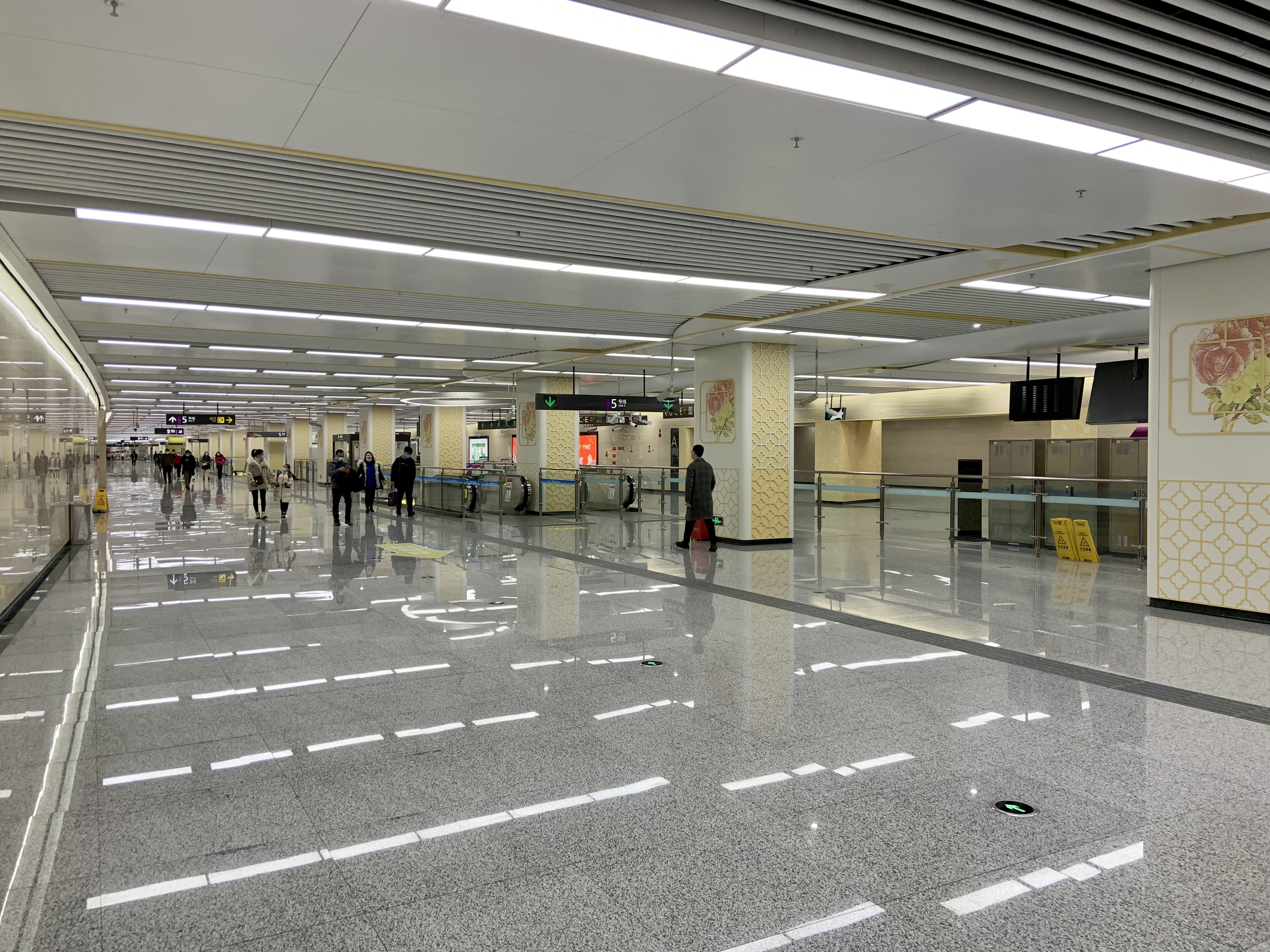
Concourse

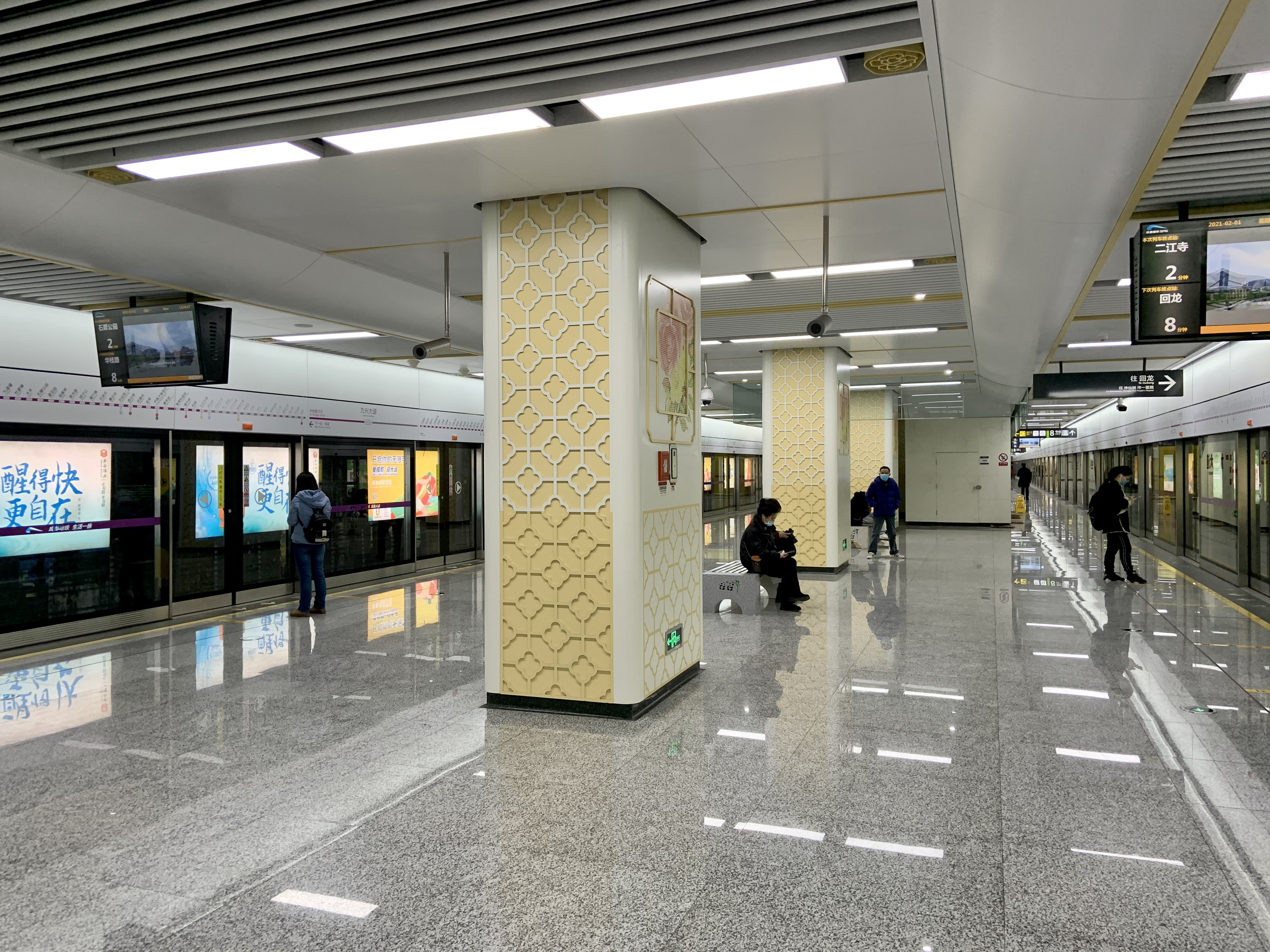
Line 5 platform

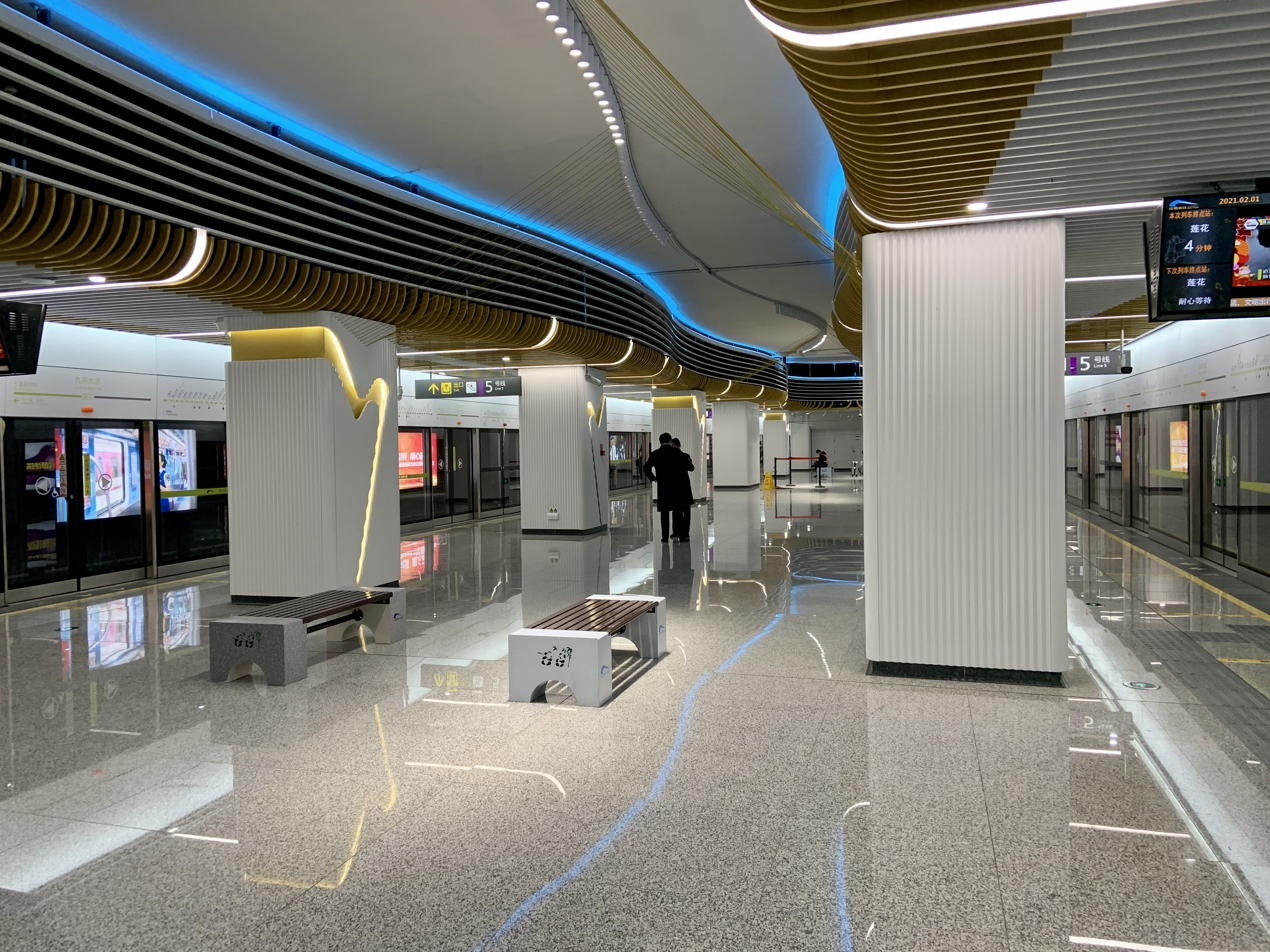
Line 8 platform
