= Gaopeng Avenue station =

Chengdu Metro station

Gaopeng Avenue 高朋大道
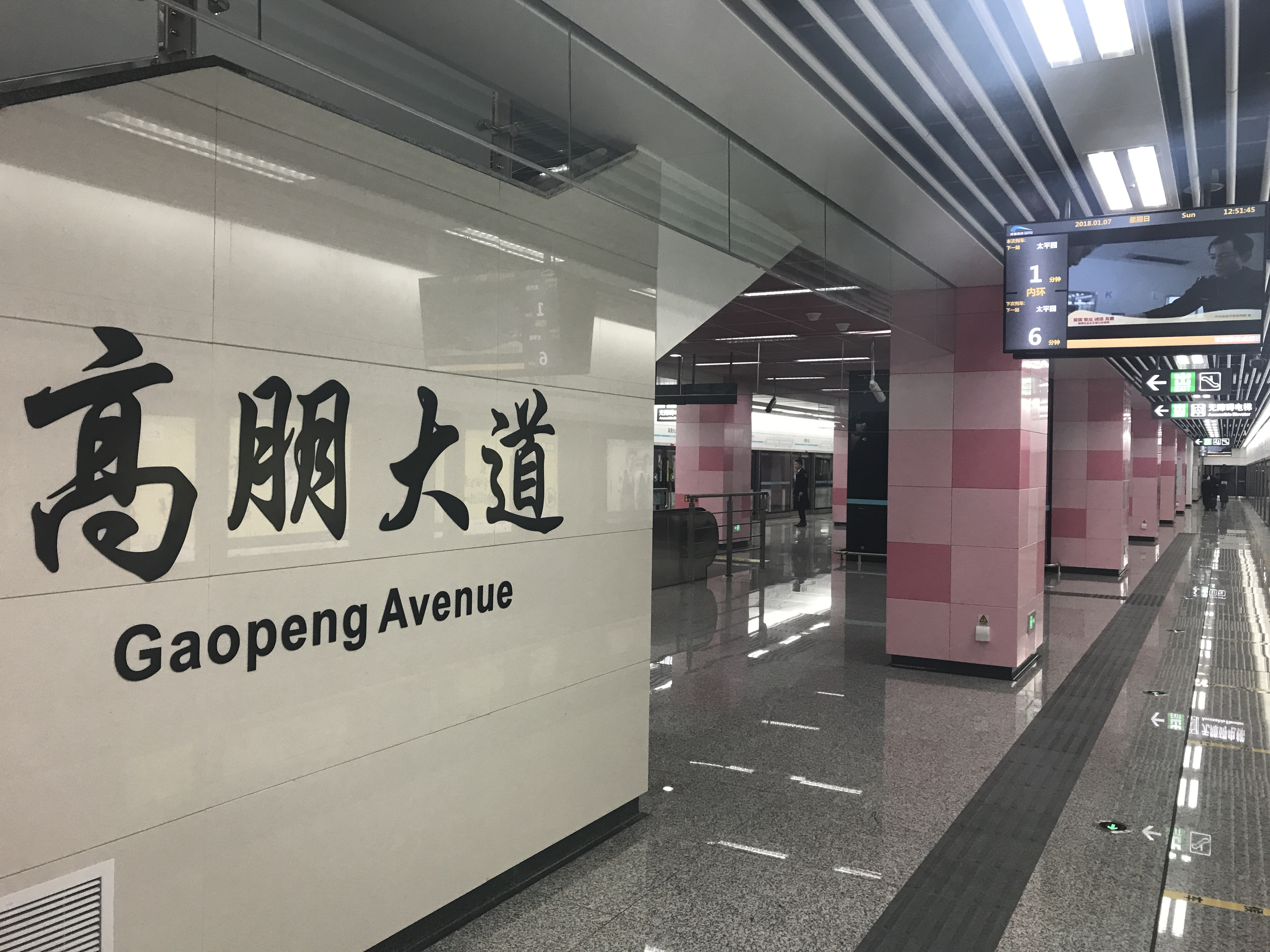
- Line 7 platform

General information
- Location: Wuhou District, Chengdu, Sichuan; China
- Coordinates: 30.6187°N 104.0319°E
- Operator: Chengdu Metro Limited
- Lines: Line 7 Line 8
- Platforms: 4 (2 island platforms)

Other information
- Station code: 0714 0822

History
- Opened: 6 December 2017

Services
Preceding station	Chengdu Metro	Following station
Taipingyuan Clockwise	Line 7	Shenxianshu Anticlockwise
Jiuxing Avenue towards Guilong Road	Line 8	Yinjialin towards Longgang
Location

Gaopeng Avenue (Chinese: 高朋大道) is a station on Line 7 and Line 8 of the Chengdu Metro in China. It was opened on 6 December 2017.

== Station layout ==
G	Entrances and Exits	Exits B-E, G, H
B1	Concourse	Faregates, Station Agent
B2	Clockwise	← Line 7 to Cuijiadian (Taipingyuan)
B2	Island platform, doors open on the left
B2	Counterclockwise	Line 7 to Cuijiadian (Shenxianshu) →
B3	Northbound	← Line 8 towards Guilong Road (Jiuxing Avenue)
B3	Island platform, doors open on the left
B3	Southbound	Line 8 towards Longgang (Yinjialin) →

== Gallery ==
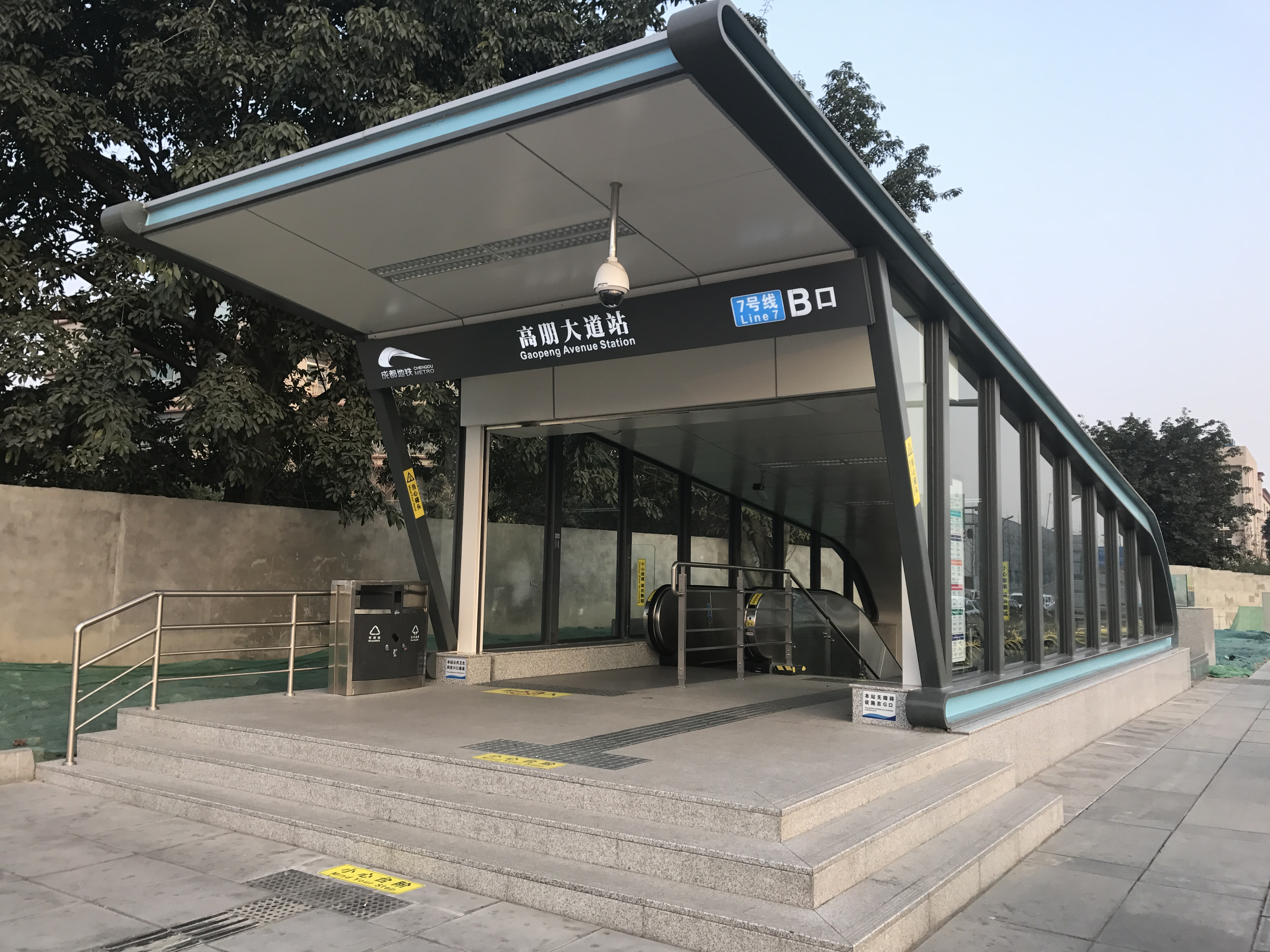
Entrance B

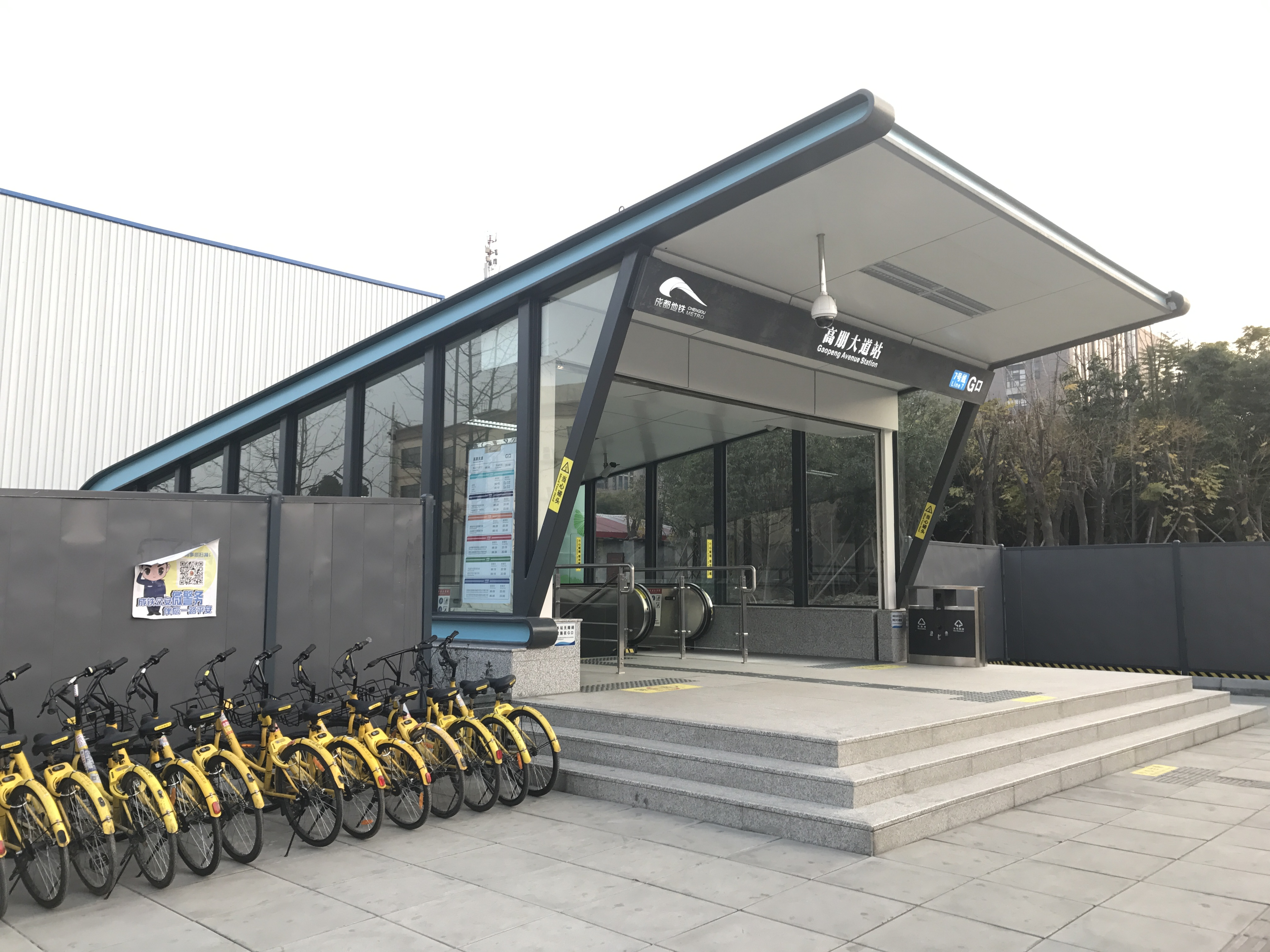
Entrance G

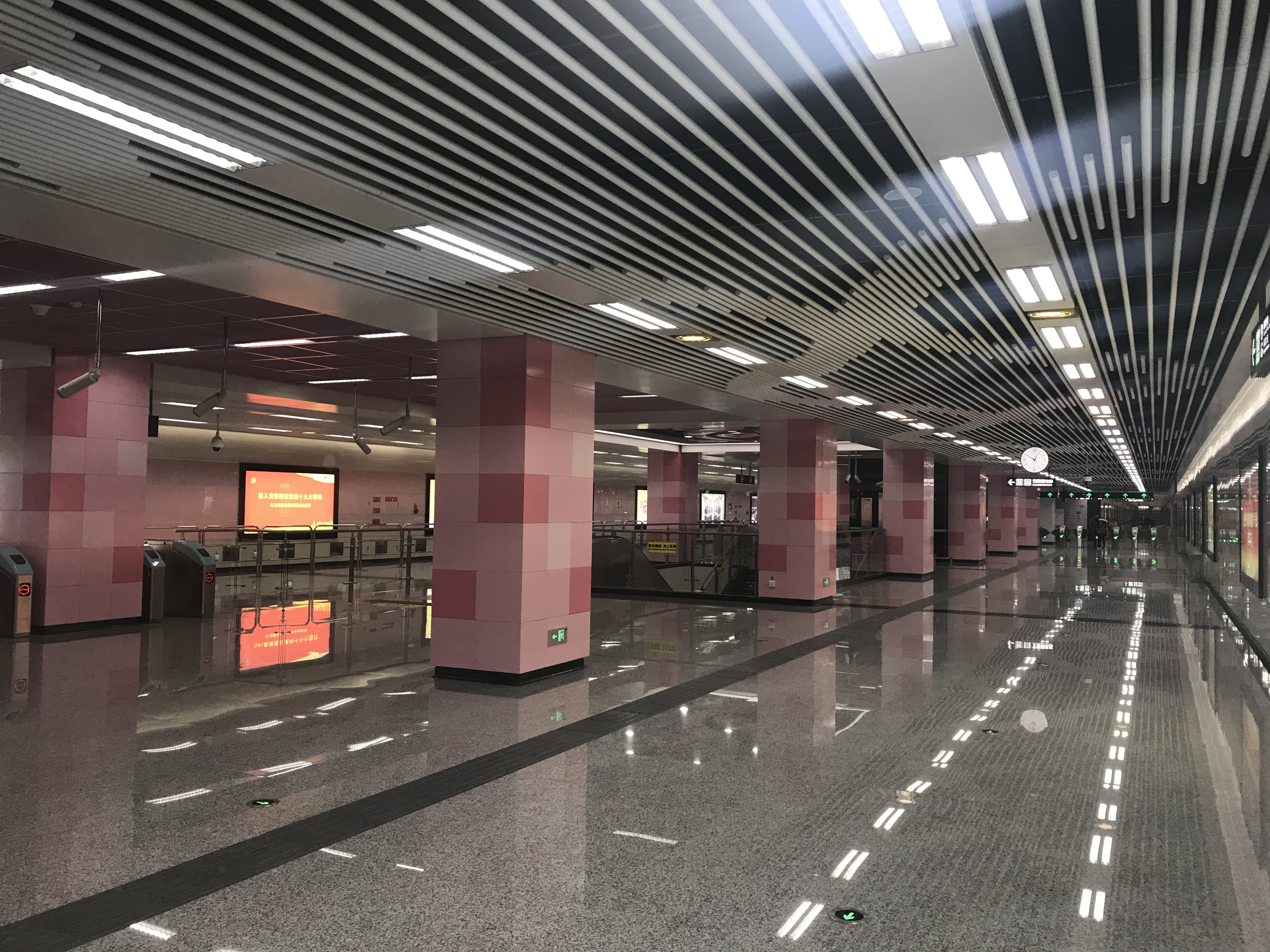
Concourse

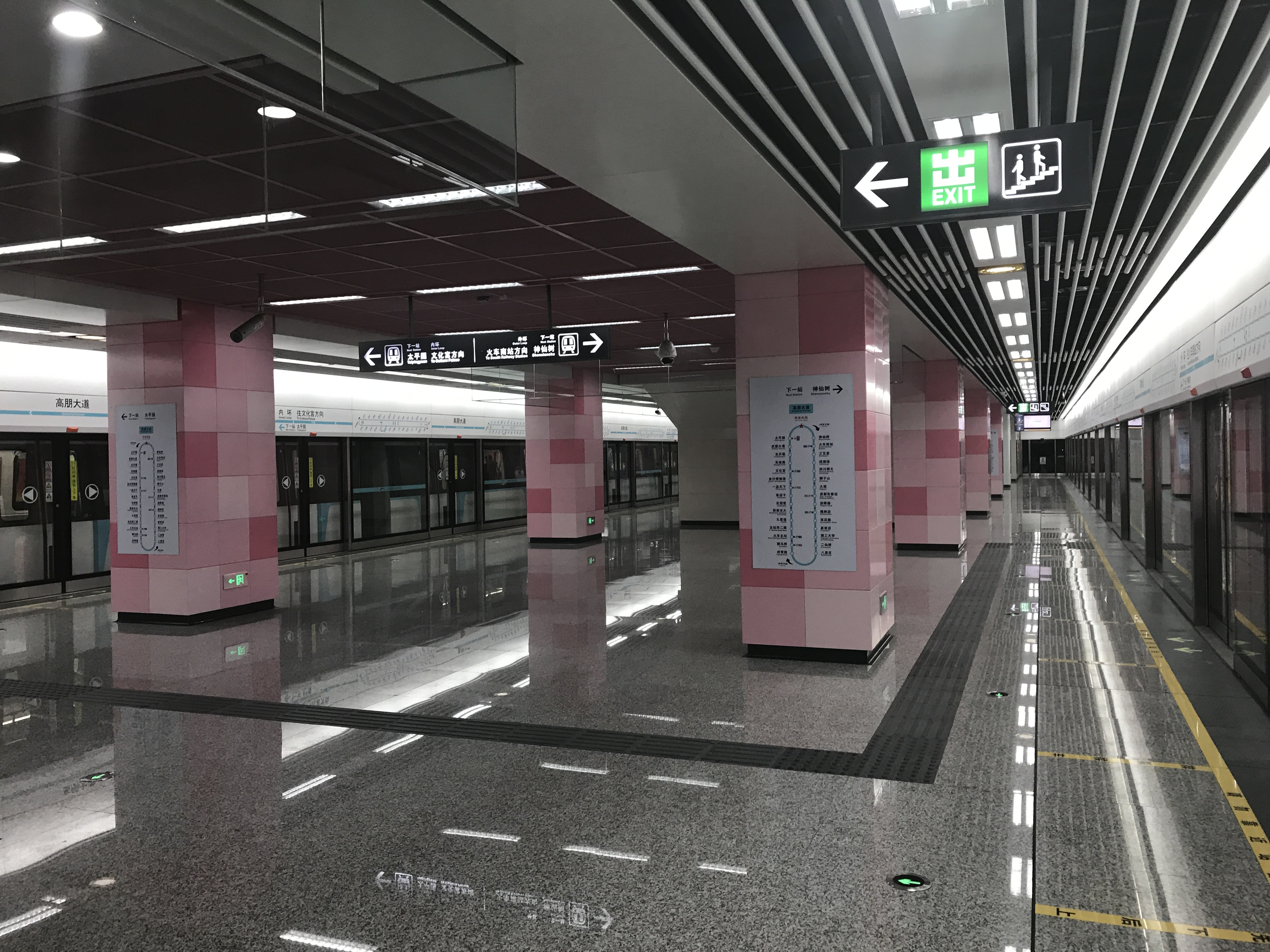
Line 7 platform

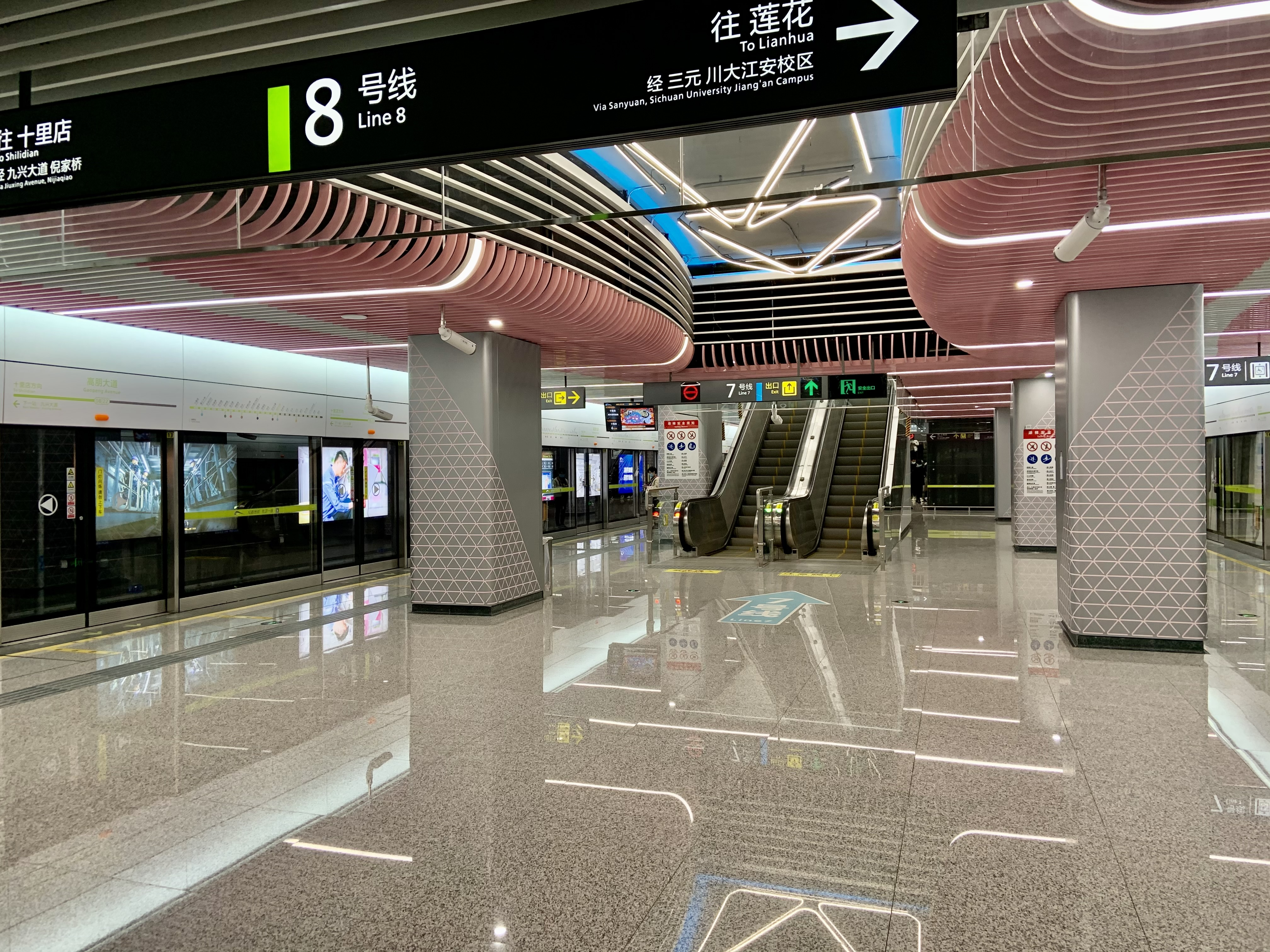
Line 8 platform
