= Qing'an station =

Metro station in Chengdu, China

Qing'an 庆安

General information
- Location: Wuhou District, Chengdu, Sichuan; China
- Coordinates: 30.60077°N 104.03164°E
- Operated by: Chengdu Metro Limited
- Line: Line 8
- Platforms: 2 (1 island platform)

Other information
- Station code: 0824

History
- Opened: 18 December 2020

Services
Preceding station	Chengdu Metro	Following station
Yinjialin towards Guilong Road	Line 8	Shiyang towards Longgang
Location

Qing'an Station is a metro station at Chengdu, Sichuan, China. It was opened on December 18, 2020 with the opening of Chengdu Metro Line 8.
