= Longqiao Road station =

Metro station in Chengdu, China

Longqiao Road 龙桥路
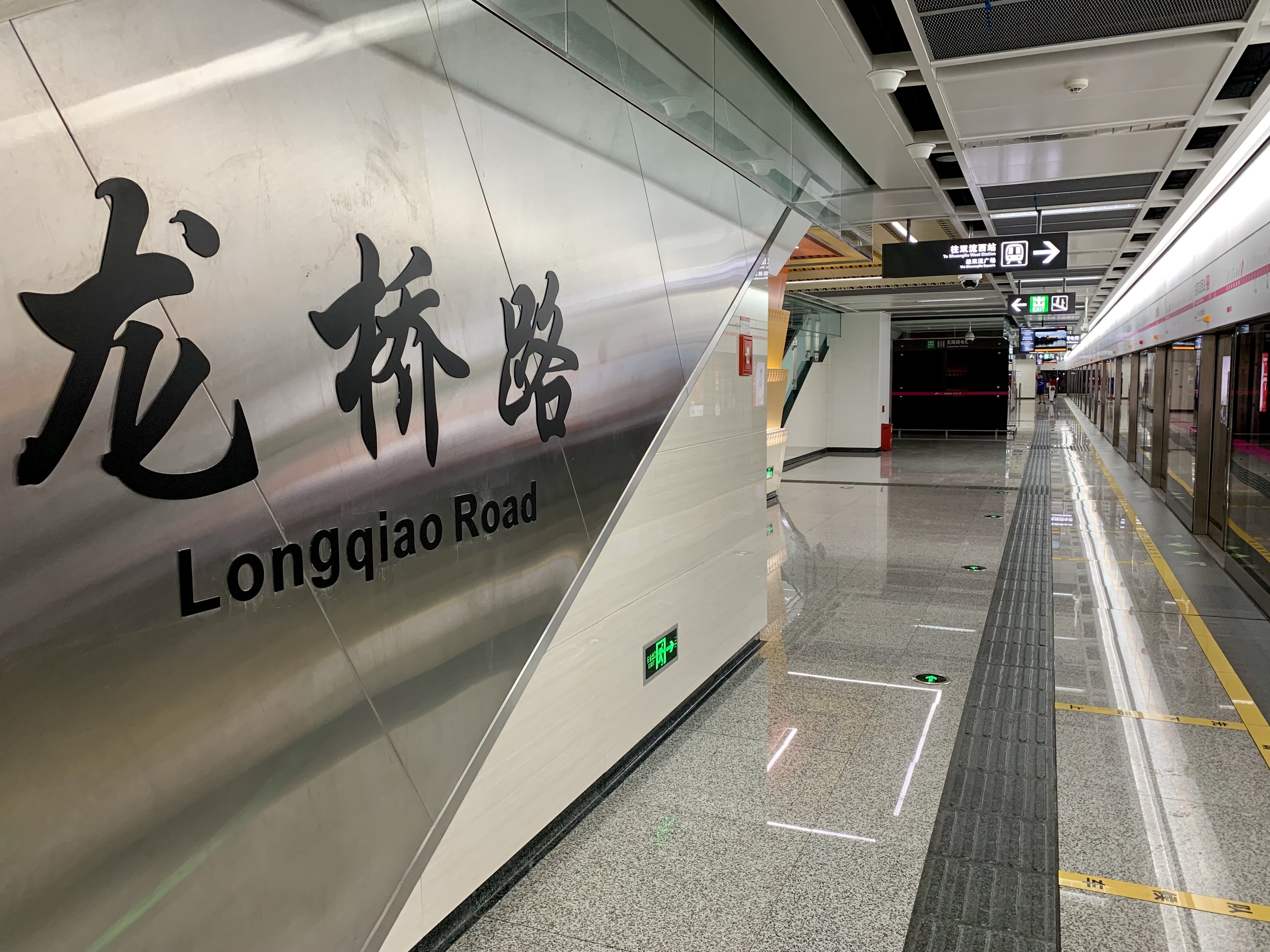
- Line 3 platform

General information
- Location: Shuangliu District, Chengdu, Sichuan; China
- Coordinates: 30.6087°N 103.9430°E
- Operated by: Chengdu Metro Limited
- Lines: Line 3 Line 19
- Platforms: 4 (2 island platforms)

Other information
- Station code: 0331 1908

History
- Opened: 26 December 2018

Services
Preceding station	Chengdu Metro	Following station
Shuangfengqiao towards Chengdu Medical College	Line 3	Hangdu Street towards Shuangliu West Railway Station
Jiujiang North towards Jinxing	Line 19	East of Terminal 2 of Shuangliu International Airport towards Tianfu Station
Location

Longqiao Road (Chinese: 龙桥路) is a station on Line 3 and Line 19 of the Chengdu Metro in China.

== Station layout ==
G	Entrances and Exits	Exits C, D, F, H, K
B1	Concourse	Faregates, Station Agent
B2	Northbound	← Line 3 towards Chengdu Medical College (Shuangfengqiao)
B2	Island platform, doors open on the left
B2	Southbound	Line 3 towards Shuangliu West Station (Hangdu Street) →
B3	Northbound	← Line 19 towards Jinxing (Jiujiang North)
B3	Island platform, doors open on the left
B3	Southbound	Line 19 towards Tianfu International Airport North (East of Terminal 2 of Shuangliu International Airport) →

== Gallery ==
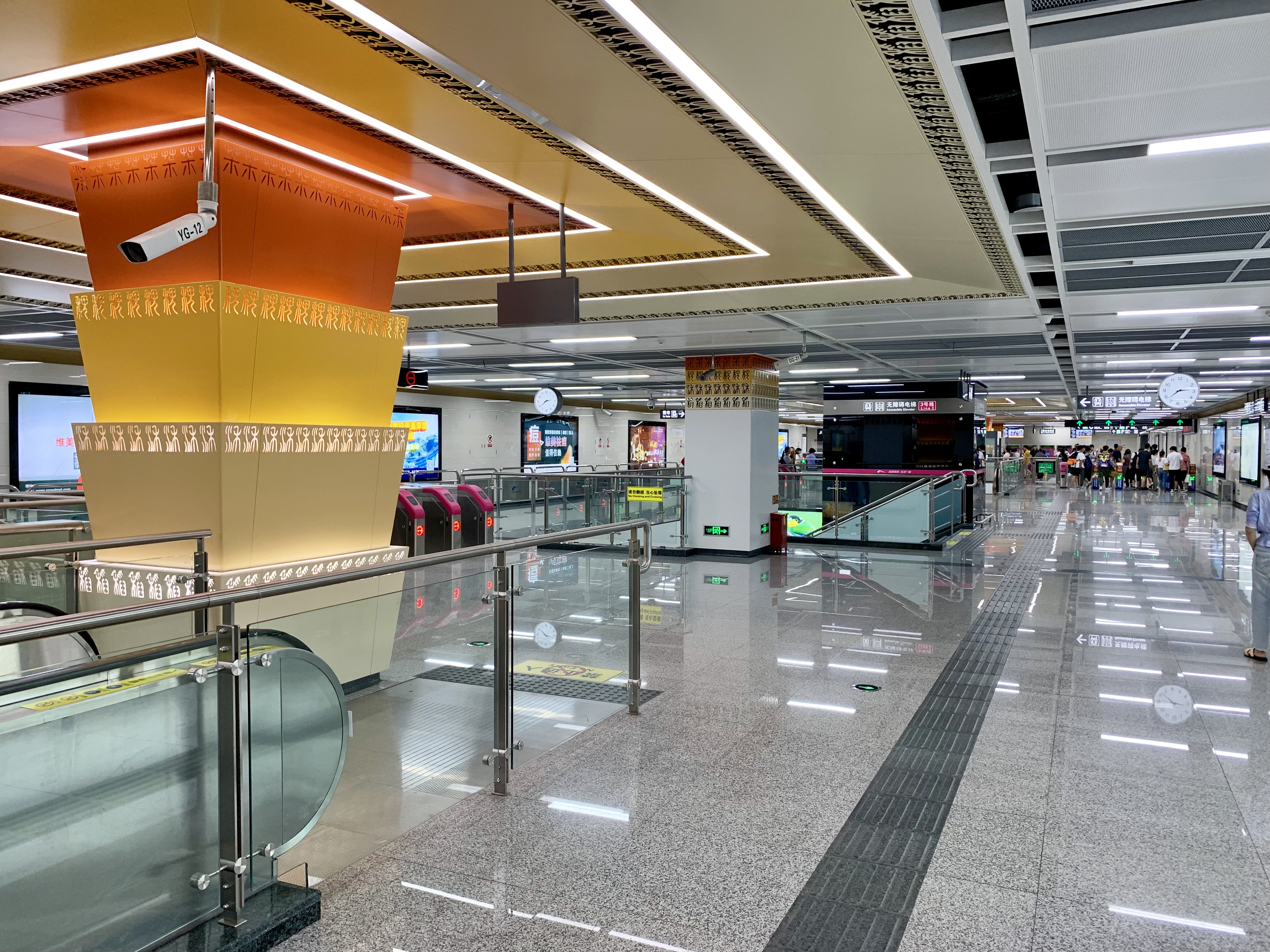
Concourse

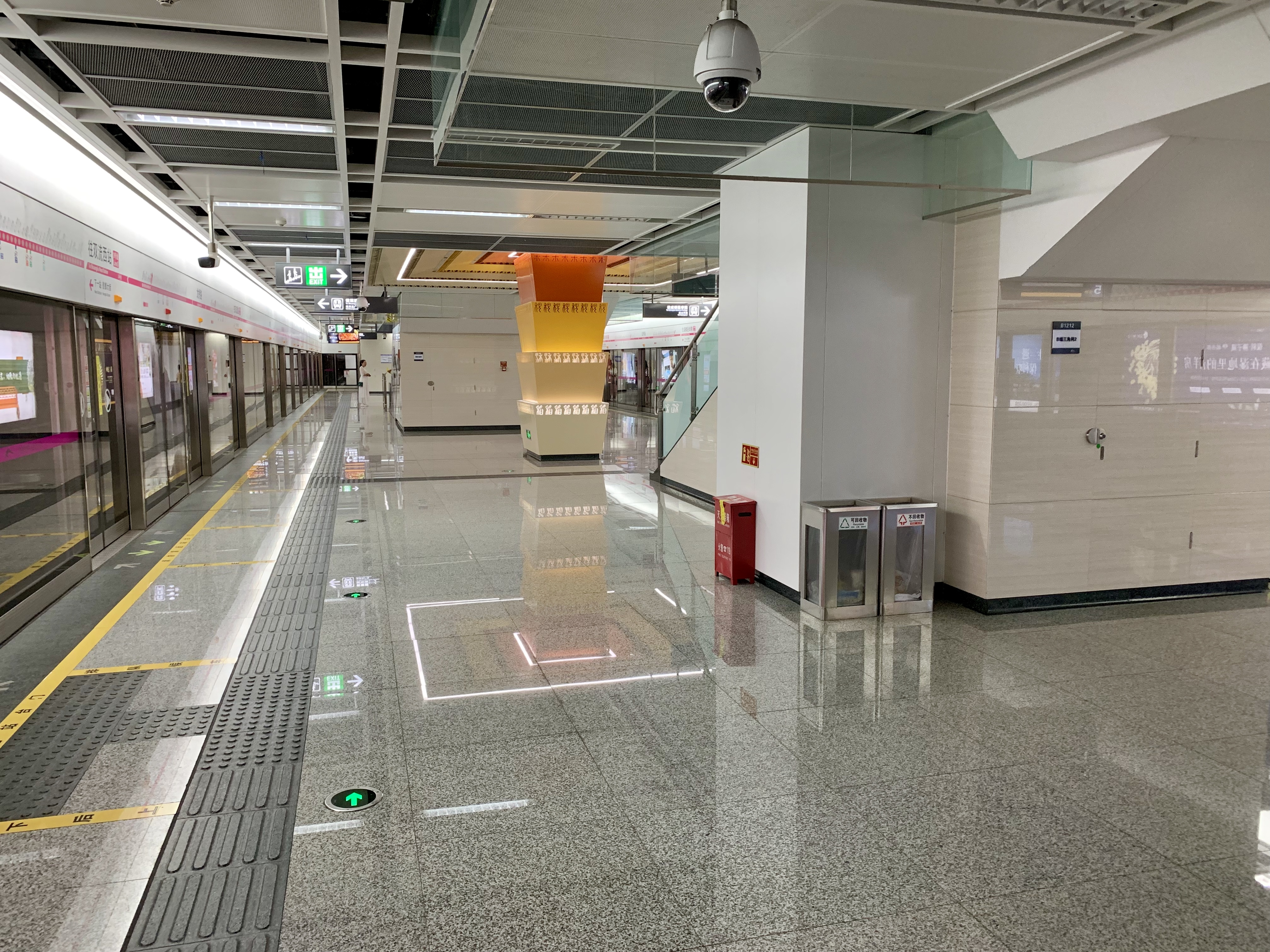
Line 3 platform
