= Shuangliu Square station =

Metro station in Chengdu, China

Shuangliu Square 双流广场
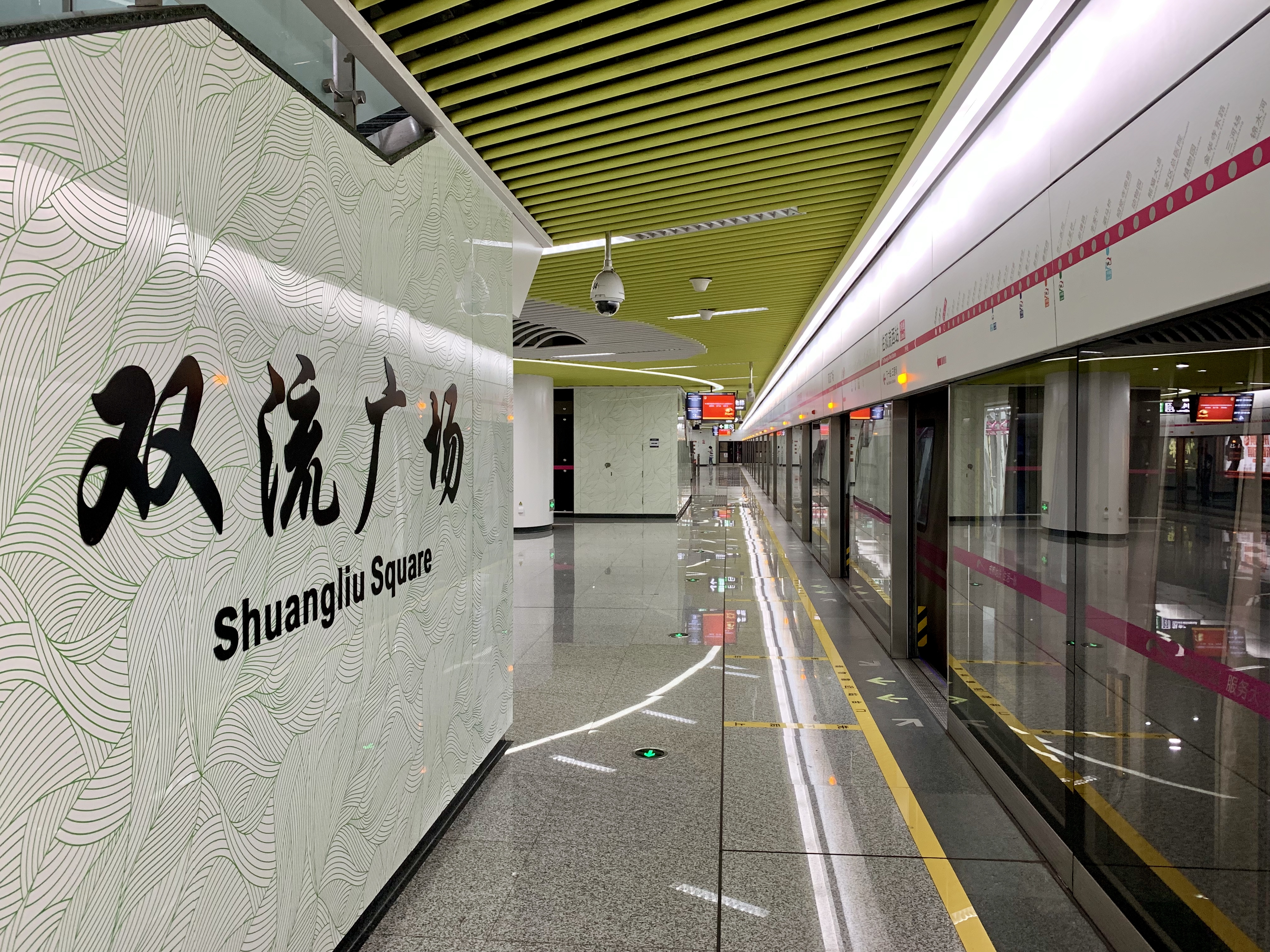

General information
- Location: Shuangliu District, Chengdu, Sichuan; China
- Operated by: Chengdu Metro Limited
- Line: Line 3
- Platforms: 2 (1 island platform)

Other information
- Station code: 0335

History
- Opened: 26 December 2018

Services
Preceding station	Chengdu Metro	Following station
Dongsheng towards Chengdu Medical College	Line 3	Sanliba towards Shuangliu West Railway Station
Location

Shuangliu Square (Chinese: 双流广场) is a station on Line 3 of the Chengdu Metro in China.

== Station layout ==
G	Entrances and Exits	Exits A-C
B1	Concourse	Faregates, Station Agent
B2	Northbound	← Line 3 towards Chengdu Medical College (Dongsheng)
B2	Island platform, doors open on the left
B2	Southbound	Line 3 towards Shuangliu West Station (Sanliba) →

== Gallery ==
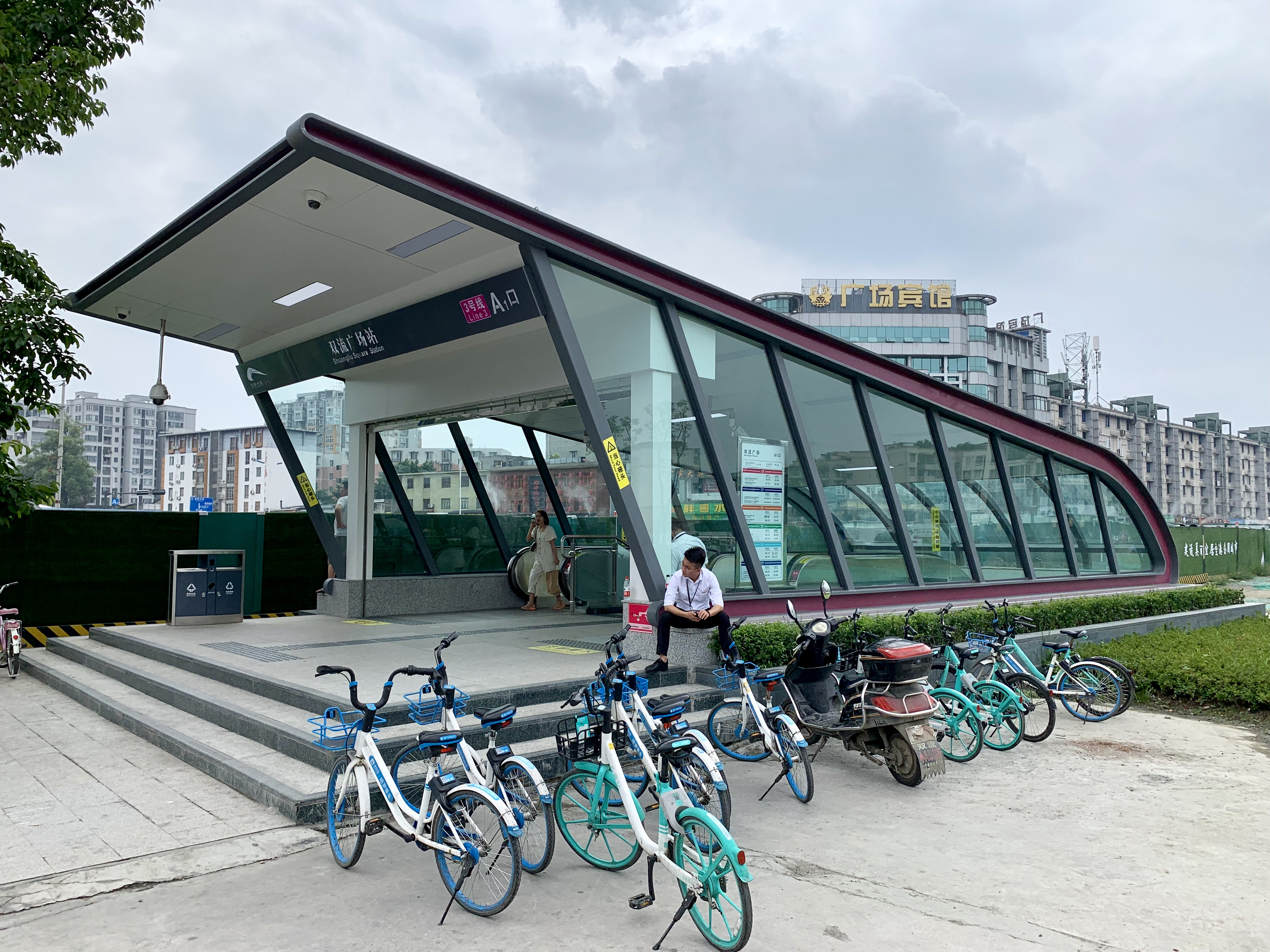
Entrance A1

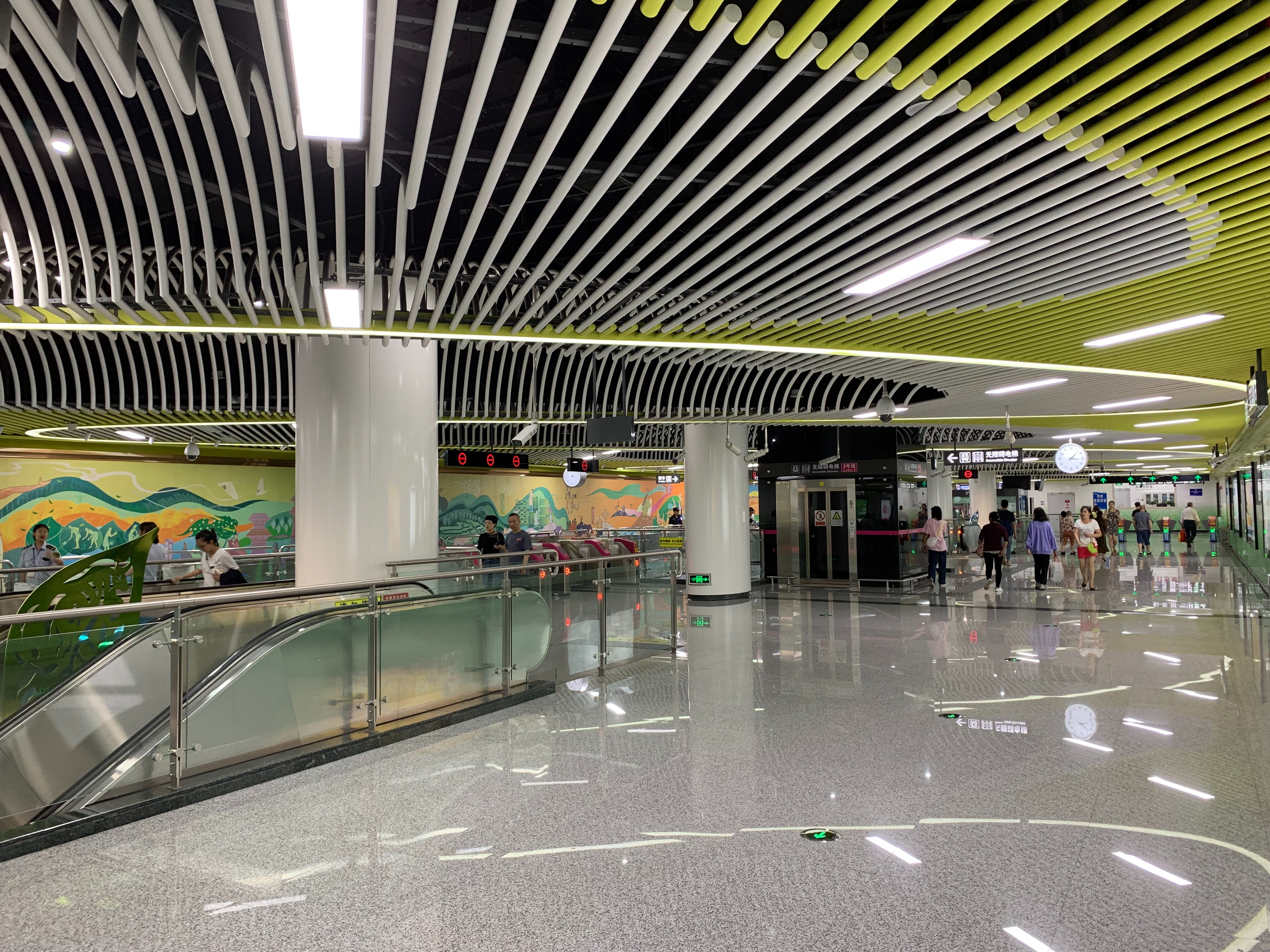
Concourse

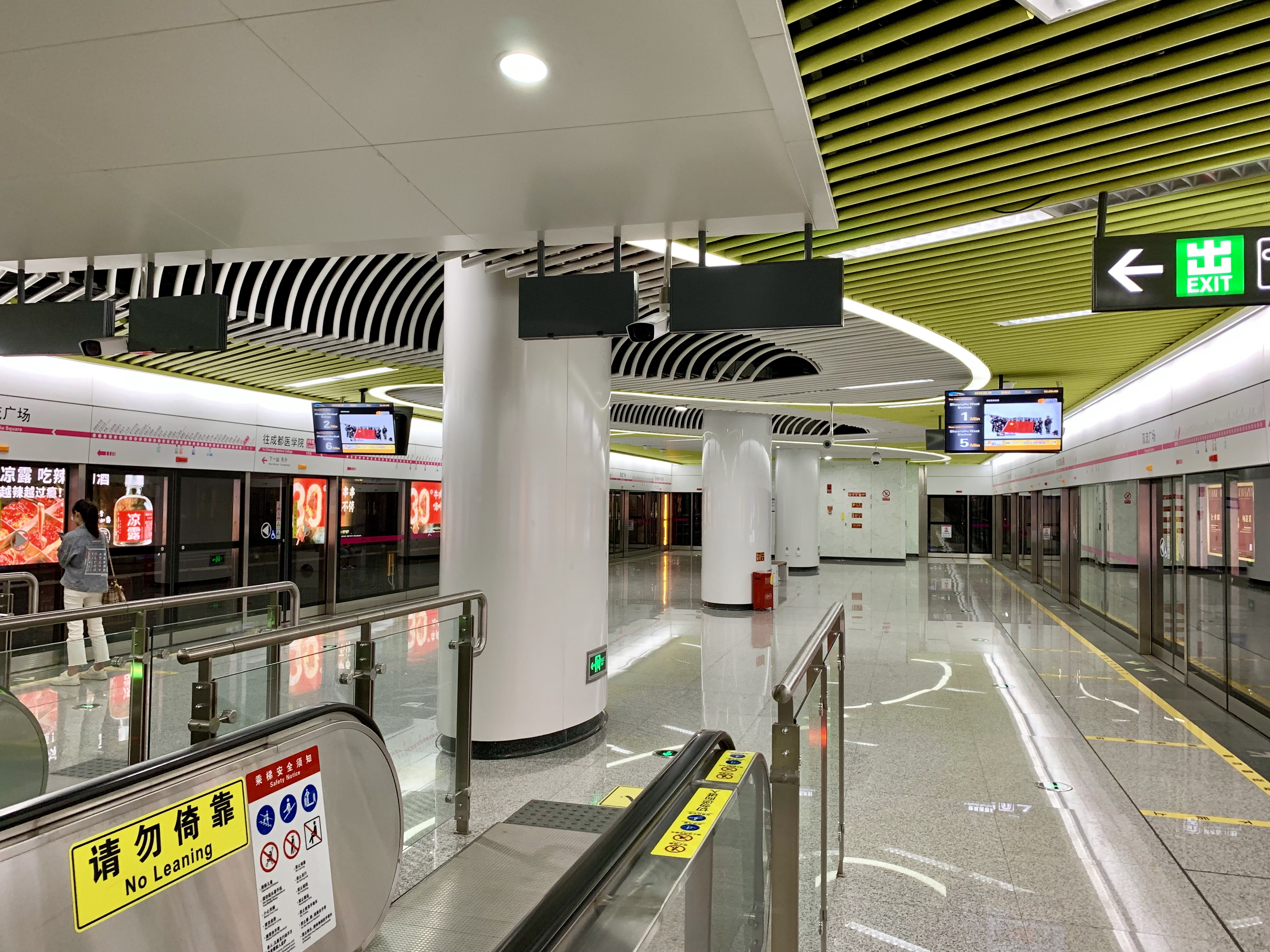
Platform
