= Shuangfengqiao station (Chengdu Metro) =

Metro station in Chengdu, China

Shuangfengqiao 双凤桥
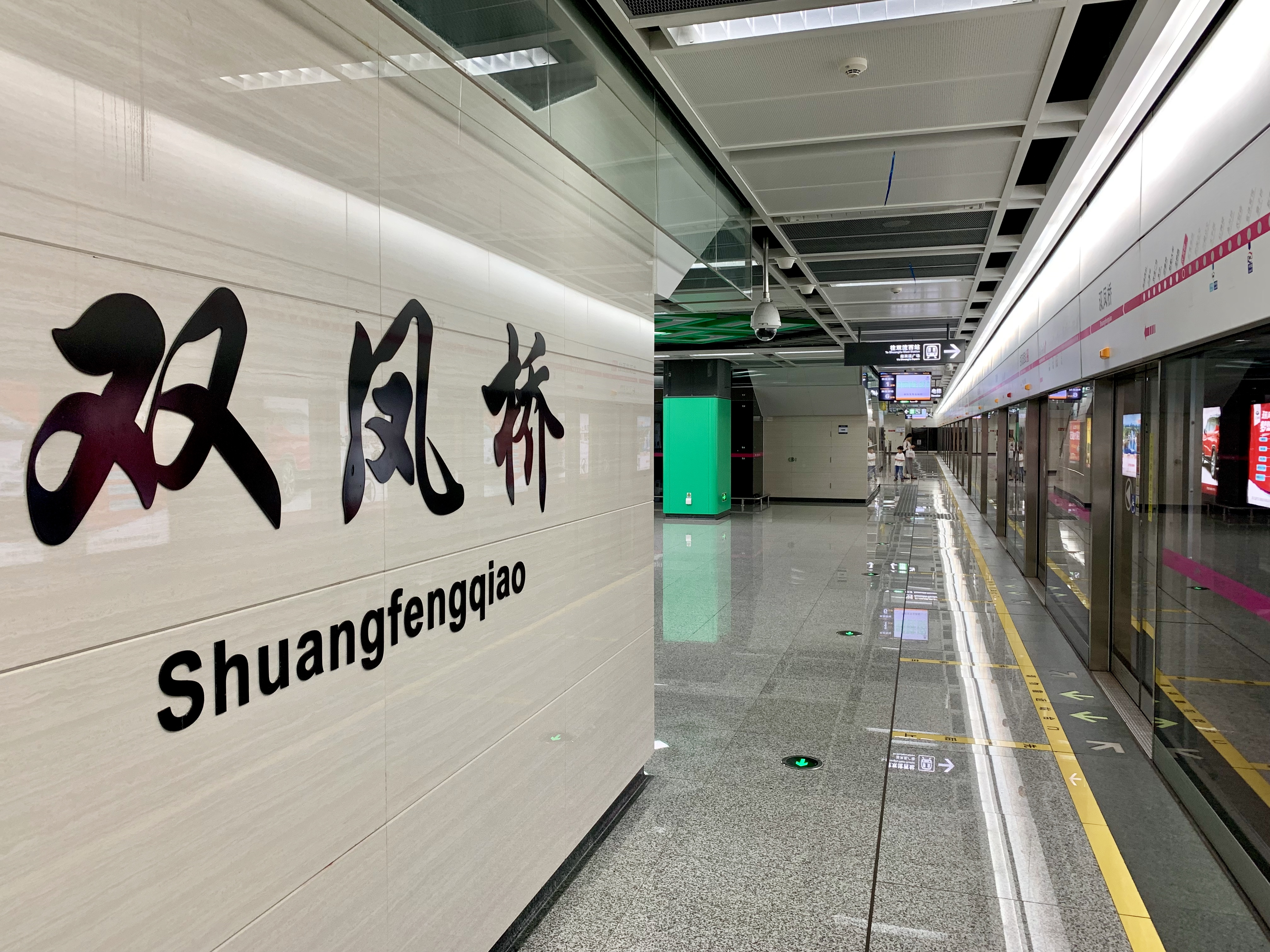

General information
- Location: Wuhou District, Chengdu, Sichuan; China
- Coordinates: 30.6186°N 103.9676°E
- Operated by: Chengdu Metro Limited
- Line: Line 3
- Platforms: 2 (1 island platform)

Other information
- Station code: 0330

History
- Opened: 26 December 2018

Services
Preceding station	Chengdu Metro	Following station
Wuqing South Road towards Chengdu Medical College	Line 3	Longqiao Road towards Shuangliu West Railway Station
Location

Shuangfengqiao (Chinese: 双凤桥) is a station on Line 3 of the Chengdu Metro in China.

== Station layout ==
G	Entrances and Exits	Exits A-D
B1	Concourse	Faregates, Station Agent
B2	Northbound	← Line 3 towards Chengdu Medical College (Wuqing South Road)
B2	Island platform, doors open on the left
B2	Southbound	Line 3 towards Shuangliu West Station (Longqiao Road) →

== Gallery ==
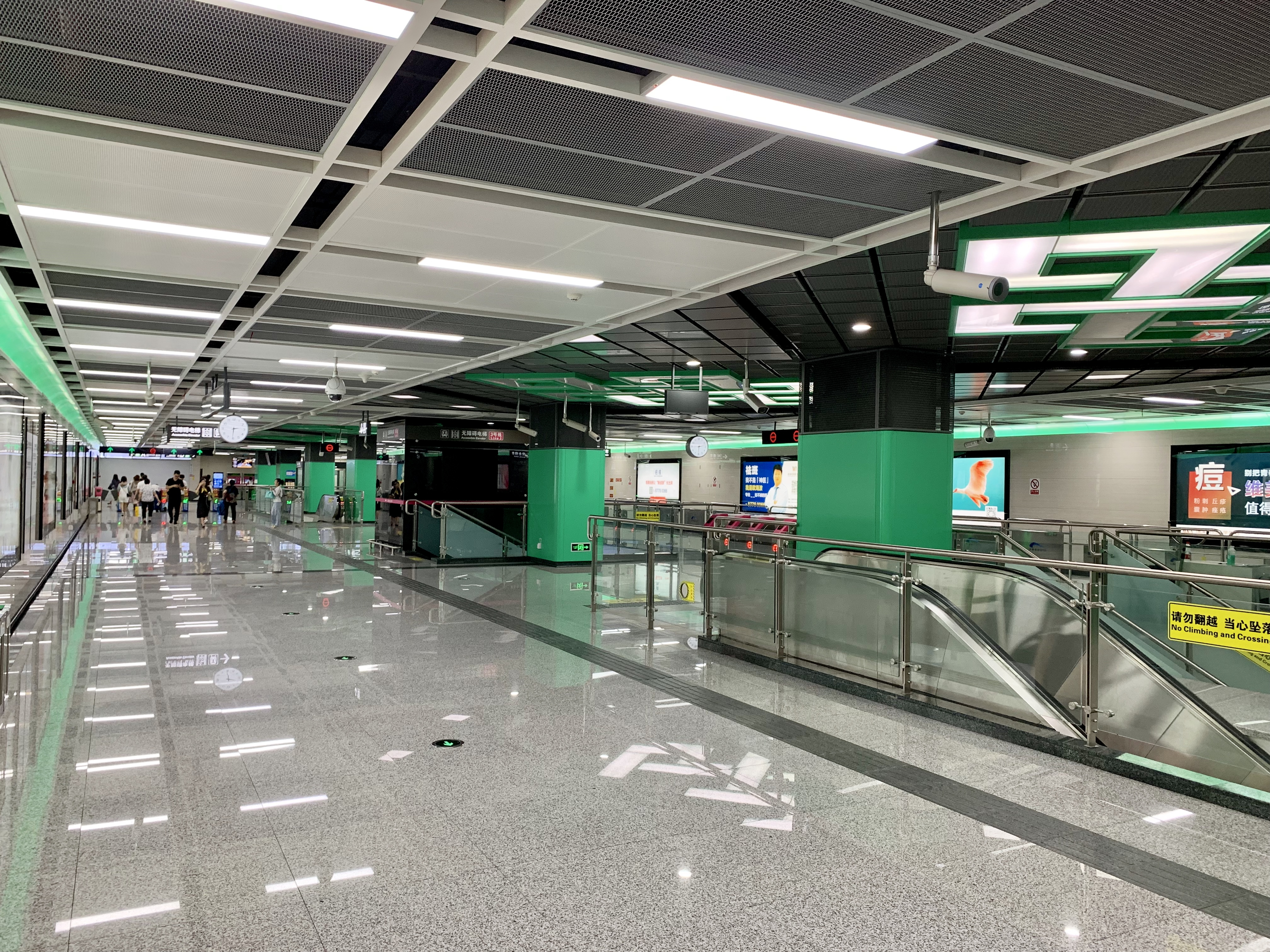
Concourse

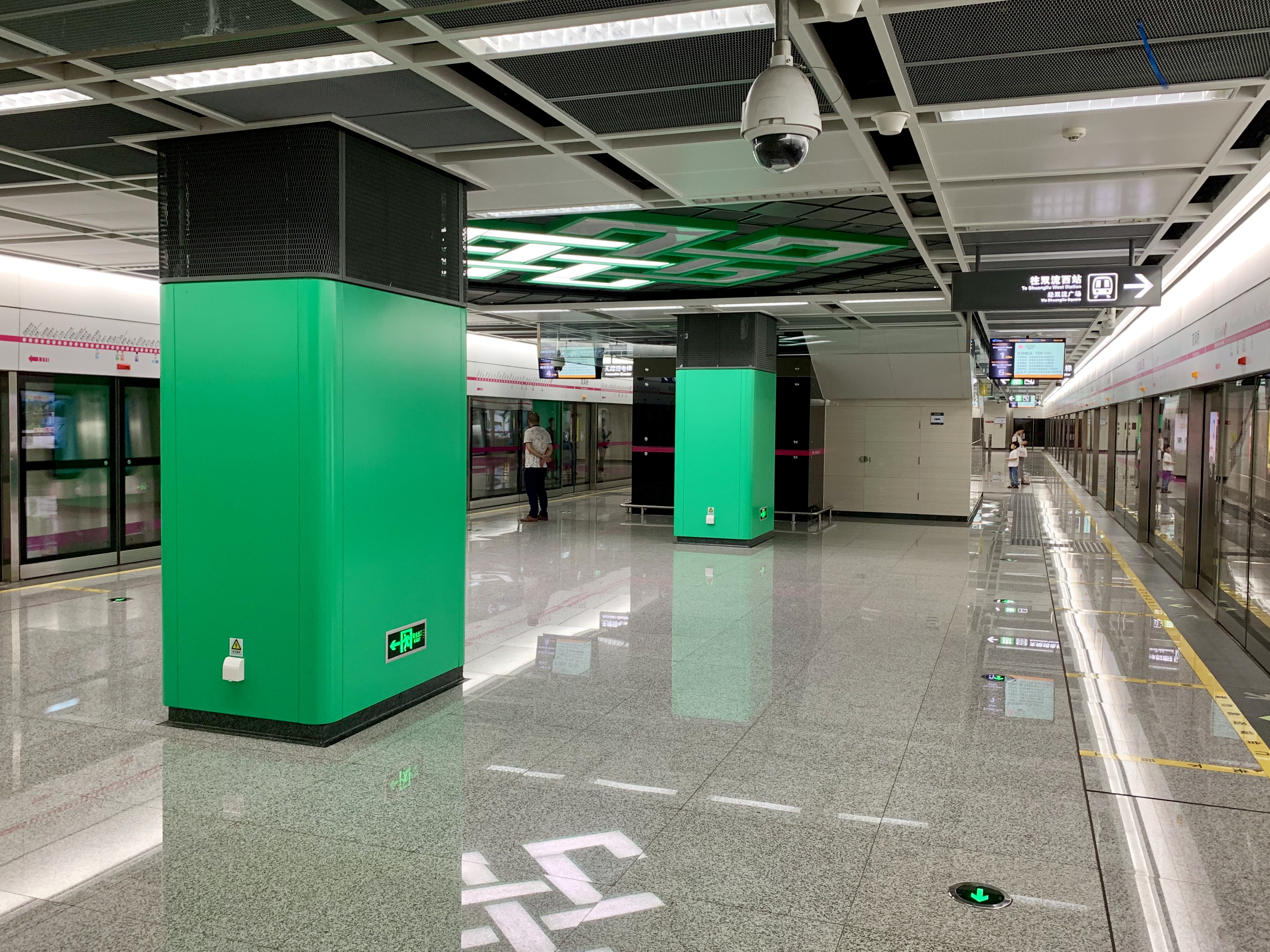
Platform
