= Southwest Petroleum University station =

Metro station in Chengdu, China

Southwest Petroleum University 石油大学
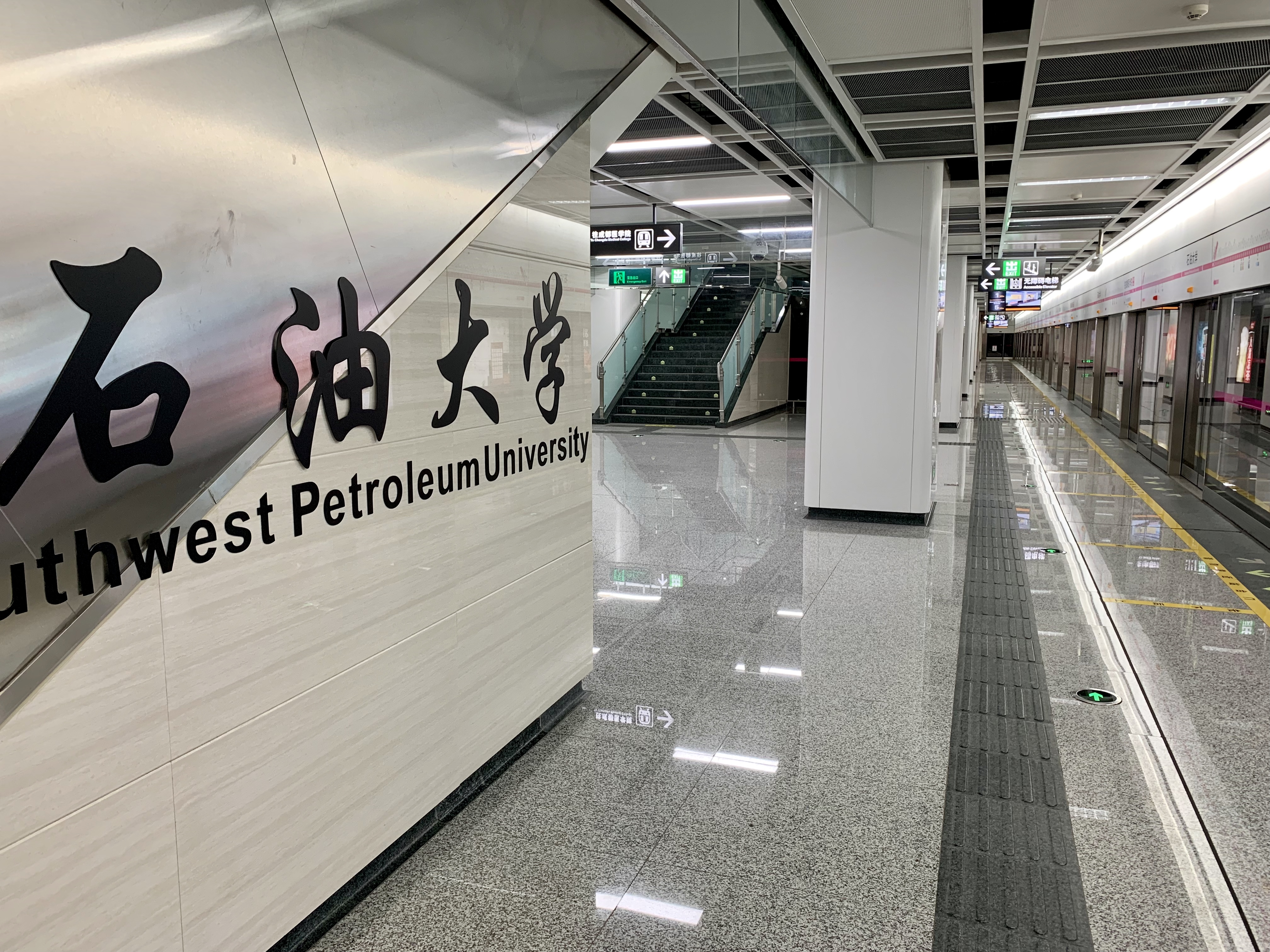

General information
- Location: Xindu District, Chengdu, Sichuan; China
- Coordinates: 30.8211°N 104.1839°E
- Operated by: Chengdu Metro Limited
- Line(s): Line 3
- Platforms: 2 (1 island platform)

Other information
- Station code: 0302

History
- Opened: 26 December 2018

Services
Preceding station	Chengdu Metro	Following station
Chengdu Medical College Terminus	Line 3	Clock Tower towards Shuangliu West Railway Station

Southwest Petroleum University (Chinese: 石油大学) is a station on Line 3 of the Chengdu Metro in China. It serves the nearby Southwest Petroleum University Chengdu Campus.

== Station layout ==
G	Entrances and Exits	Exits A-D
B1	Concourse	Faregates, Station Agent
B2	Northbound	← Line 3 towards Chengdu Medical College (Terminus)
B2	Island platform, doors open on the left
B2	Southbound	Line 3 towards Shuangliu West Station (Clock Tower) →

== Gallery ==
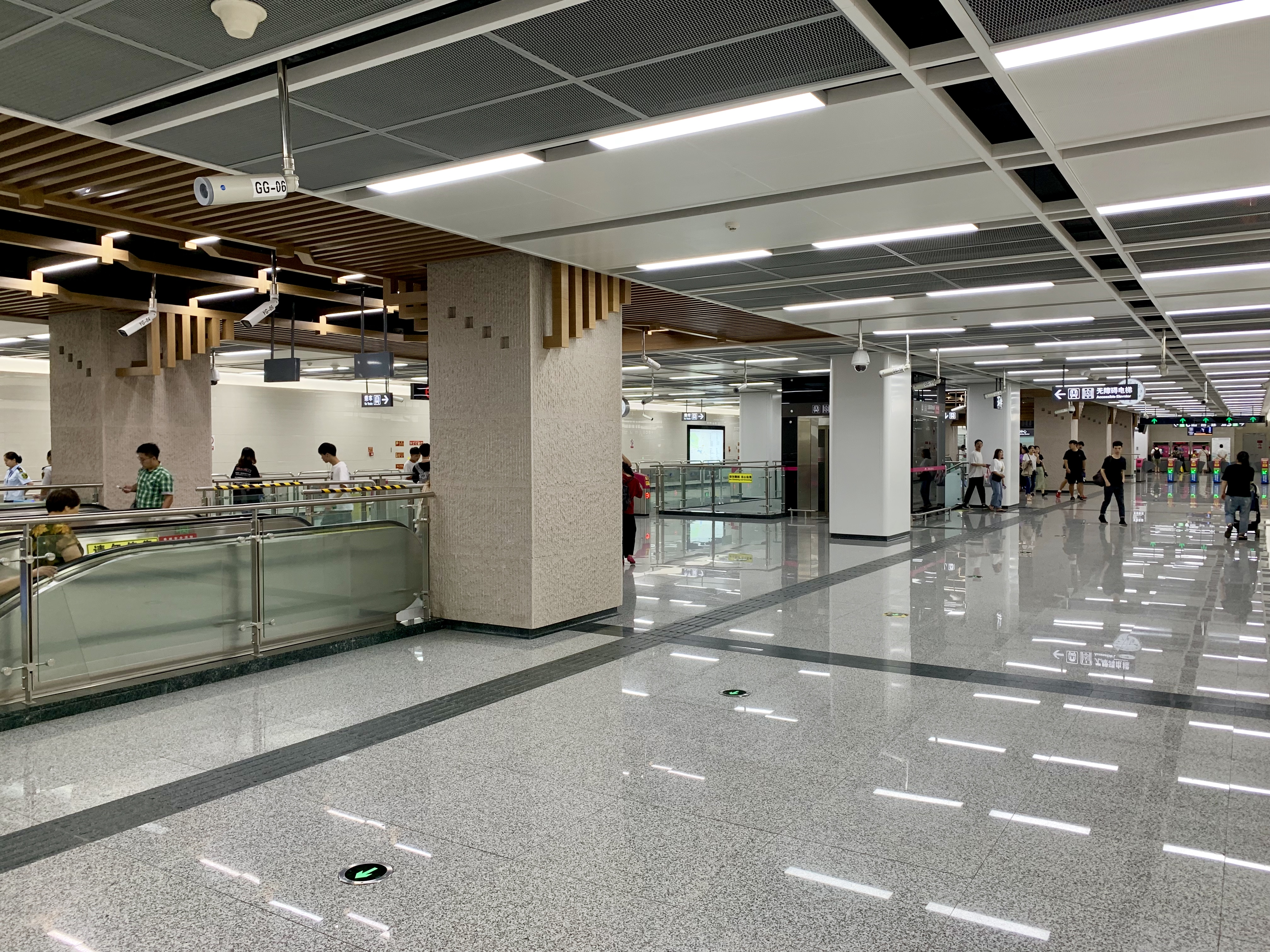
Concourse

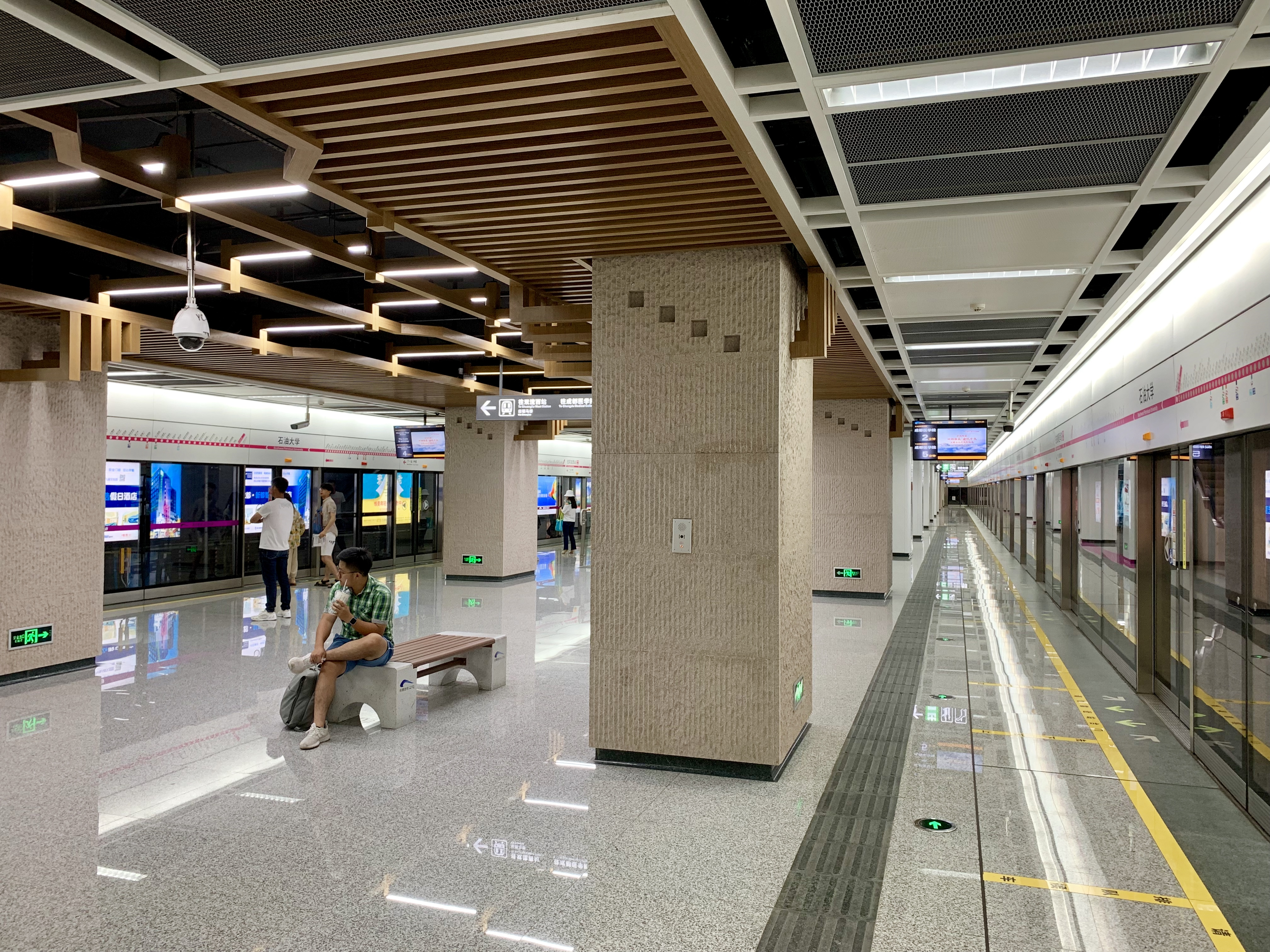
Platform
