= Shuangfengqiao station =

Shuangfengqiao station may refer to:

- Shuangfengqiao station (Chengdu Metro)
- Shuangfengqiao station (Chongqing Rail Transit)
