= Line 3 (Chengdu Metro) =

Metro line in Chengdu, China

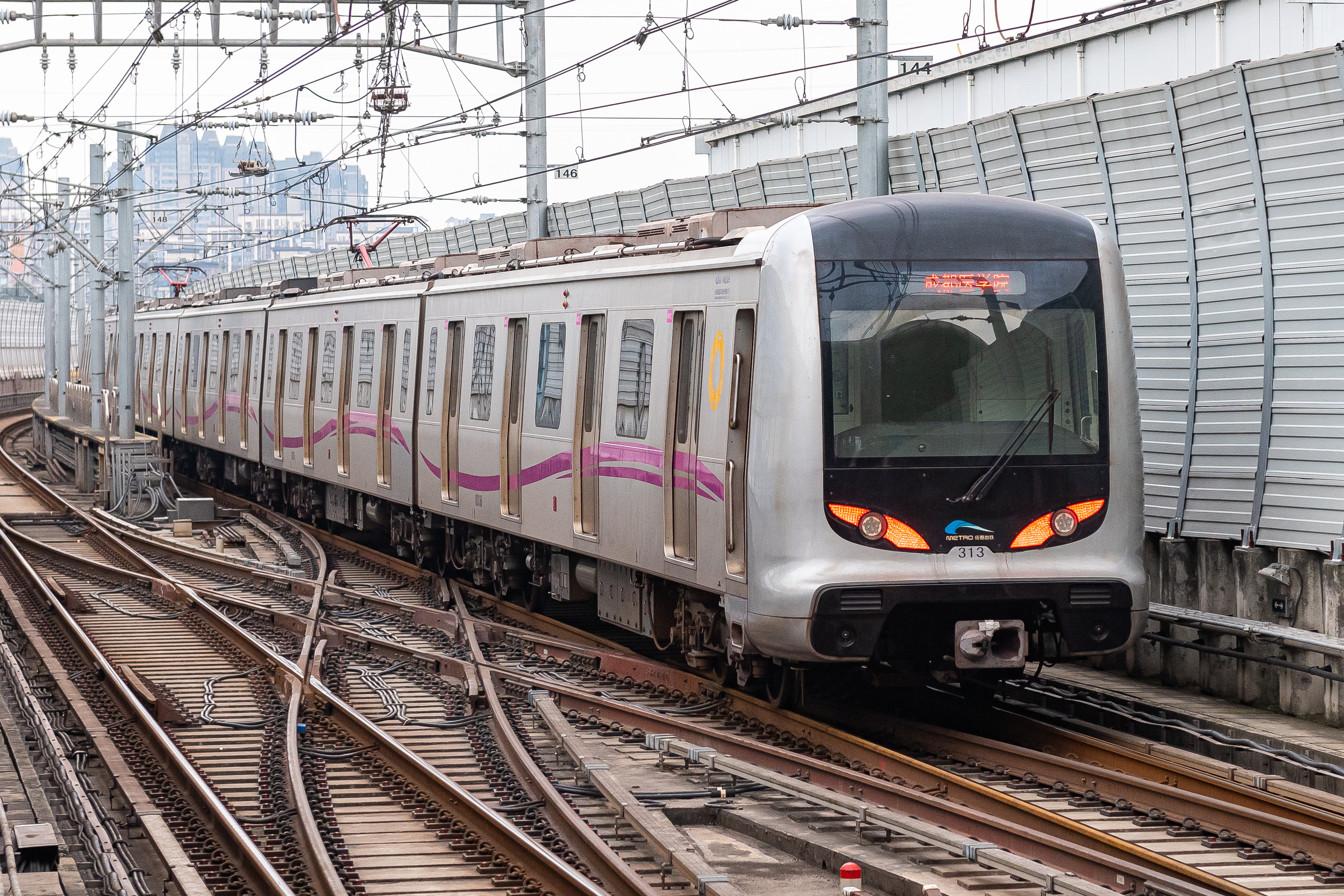
- A Line 3 train leaving at Jinhuasi East Road station

Overview
- Status: Operational
- Owner: Chengdu
- Locale: Chengdu, China
- Termini: Chengdu Medical College; Shuangliu West Railway Station
- Stations: 37

Service
- Type: Rapid transit
- System: Chengdu Metro
- Services: 1
- Operator: Chengdu Metro Limited
- Daily ridership: 354,200 (2016 Peak)

History
- Opened: 31 July 2016; 9 years ago

Technical
- Line length: 49.89 km (31.00 mi)
- Number of tracks: 2
- Character: Underground and Elevated
- Track gauge: 1,435 mm (4 ft 8 1/2 in)
- Operating speed: 80 km/h (50 mph)

Line 3 of the Chengdu Metro (Chinese: 成都地铁3号线; pinyin: Chéngdū Dìtiě Sān Hào Xiàn) runs in a northeast-southwest direction from Chengdu Medical College to Shuangliu West Station. The total length is 49.85 km (30.98 mi). Line 3's color is magenta. Phase 1 of this line began construction on 28 April 2012, began trial operation in June 2016 and opened on 31 July 2016.

== Opening timeline ==
Segment	Commencement	Length	Station(s)	Name
Chengdu Junqu General Hospital — Taipingyuan	31 July 2016	20.33 km (12.63 mi)	17	Phase 1
Taipingyuan — Shuangliu West Station	26 December 2018	12.7 km (7.89 mi)	9	Phase 2
Chengdu Medical College — Chengdu Junqu General Hospital	26 December 2018	17.4 km (10.81 mi)	11	Phase 3

== Stations ==
Service routes		Station №	Station name		Transfer	Distance km	Location
Service routes		Station №	English	Chinese	Transfer	Distance km	Location
●		0301	Chengdu Medical College	成都医学院		0.00	Xindu
●		0302	Southwest Petroleum University	石油大学		0.80	Xindu
●		0303	Clock Tower	钟楼		1.12	Xindu
●		0304	Machao West Road	马超西路		1.45	Xindu
●		0305	Tuanjiexinqu	团结新区		1.10	Xindu
●	●	0306	Jinshuihe	锦水河		0.95	Xindu
●	●	0307	Sanhechang	三河场		1.98	Xindu
●	●	0308	Jinhuasi East Road	金华寺东路		2.05	Xindu
●	●	0309	Botanical Garden	植物园		0.88	Jinniu
●	●	0310	Chengdu Junqu General Hospital	军区总医院		2.20	Jinniu
●	●	0311	Panda Avenue	熊猫大道	9	2.24	Chenghua
●	●	0312	Chengdu Zoo	动物园		1.39	Chenghua
●	●	0313	Zhaojuesi South Road	昭觉寺南路		1.24	Chenghua
●	●	0314	Sima Bridge	驷马桥	7	1.01	Chenghua
●	●	0315	Lijiatuo	李家沱	Chengdu BRT	0.70	Chenghua
●	●	0316	Qianfeng Road	前锋路	6	1.27	Chenghua
●	●	0317	Hongxing Bridge	红星桥	17	0.93	Jinjiang
●	●	0318	Chengdu Second People's Hospital	市二医院	4	1.31	Jinjiang
●	●	0319	Chunxi Road	春熙路	2	0.86	Jinjiang
●	●	0320	Xinnanmen	新南门	13	1.18	Jinjiang
●	●	0321	Moziqiao	磨子桥		0.78	Wuhou
●	●	0322	Sichuan Gymnasium	省体育馆	1 18	1.26	Wuhou
●	●	0323	Yiguanmiao	衣冠庙		1.37	Wuhou
●	●	0324	Gaoshengqiao	高升桥	5 10	1.11	Wuhou
●	●	0325	Hongpailou	红牌楼	10	1.51	Wuhou
●	●	0326	Taipingyuan	太平园	7 10	1.37	Wuhou
●	●	0327	Chuanzang Flyover	川藏立交		1.82	Wuhou
●	●	0328	Wuhou Flyover	武侯立交		1.47	Wuhou
●	●	0329	Wuqing South Road	武青南路	9	0.91	Wuhou
●	●	0330	Shuangfengqiao	双凤桥		1.67	Wuhou
●	●	0331	Longqiao Road	龙桥路	19	2.78	Shuangliu
●		0332	Hangdu Street	航都大街		1.86	Shuangliu
●		0333	Yingchunqiao	迎春桥		1.55	Shuangliu
●		0334	Dongsheng	东升		1.33	Shuangliu
●		0335	Shuangliu Square	双流广场		0.90	Shuangliu
●		0336	Sanliba	三里坝		1.32	Shuangliu
●		0337	Shuangliu West Railway Station	双流西站	10	1.94	Shuangliu

== See also ==
- Chengdu Metro
- Urban rail transit in China
