= Shuangliu West railway station =

Railway station in Chengdu, China

Shuangliu West 双流西站
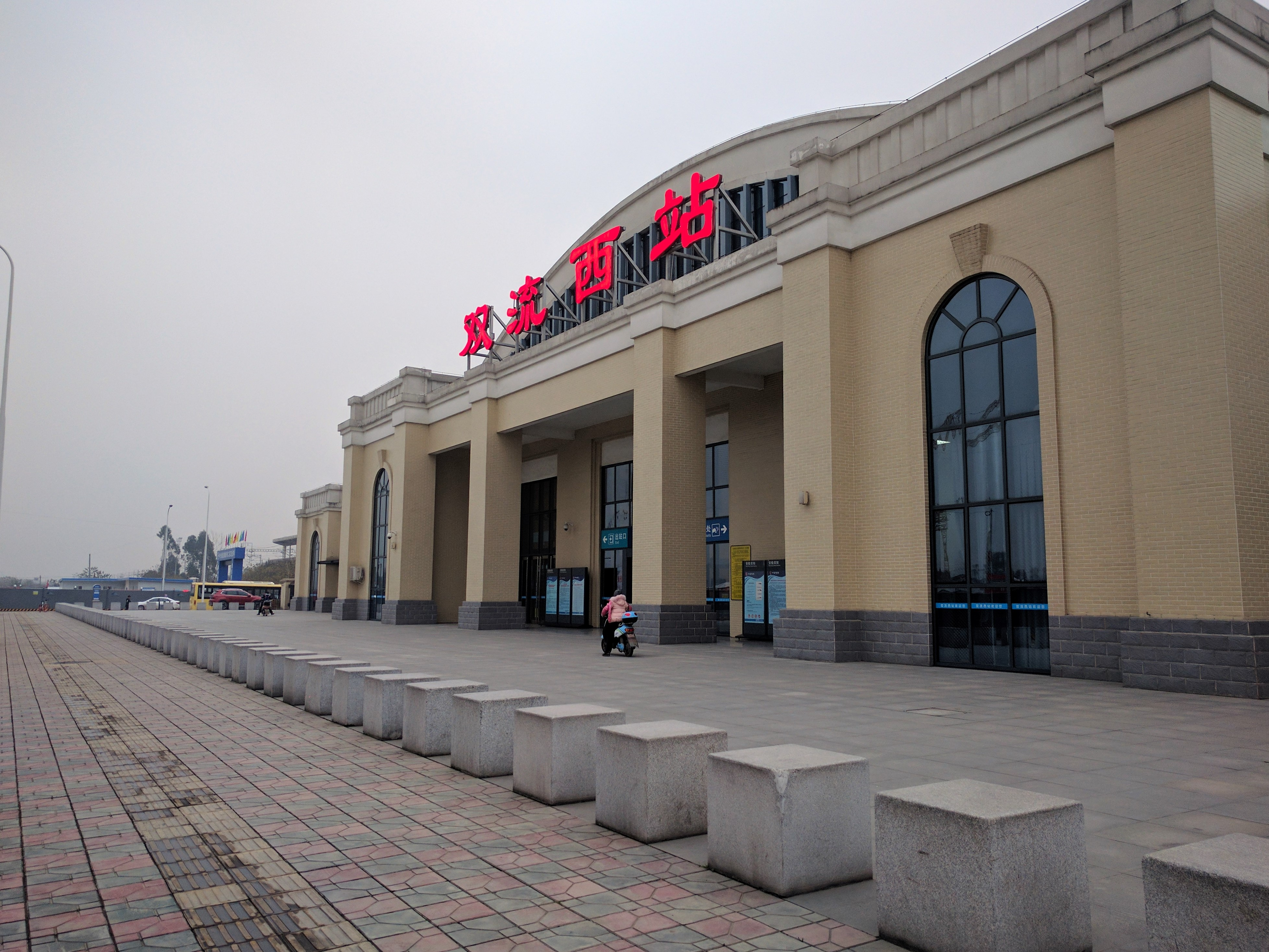

General information
- Other names: Shuangliuxi railway station
- Location: Shuangliu District, Chengdu, Sichuan; China
- Coordinates: 30.5456°N 103.9165°E
- Operated by: Chengdu Railway Bureau, China Railway Corporation
- Lines: Chengdu–Guiyang high-speed railway Chengdu–Mianyang–Leshan intercity railway

Other information
- Station code: Telegraph code: IQW; Pinyin code: SLX

History
- Opened: 20 December 2014
Location

Shuangliu West railway station (simplified Chinese: 双流西站; traditional Chinese: 雙流西站) is a railway station located in Shuangliu District, Chengdu, Sichuan, on the Chengdu–Mianyang–Leshan intercity railway which also serves as a transfer station between Line 3 and Line 10 of the Chengdu Metro.

== History ==
The station opened on 20 December 2014 for Chengdu-Leshan train services. Chengdu–Mianyang–Leshan intercity railway services commenced on 10 January 2016.

On 25 August 2023, the passenger services was stopped leaving only freight services.

== Chengdu Metro ==
Shuangliu West Railway Station 双流西站
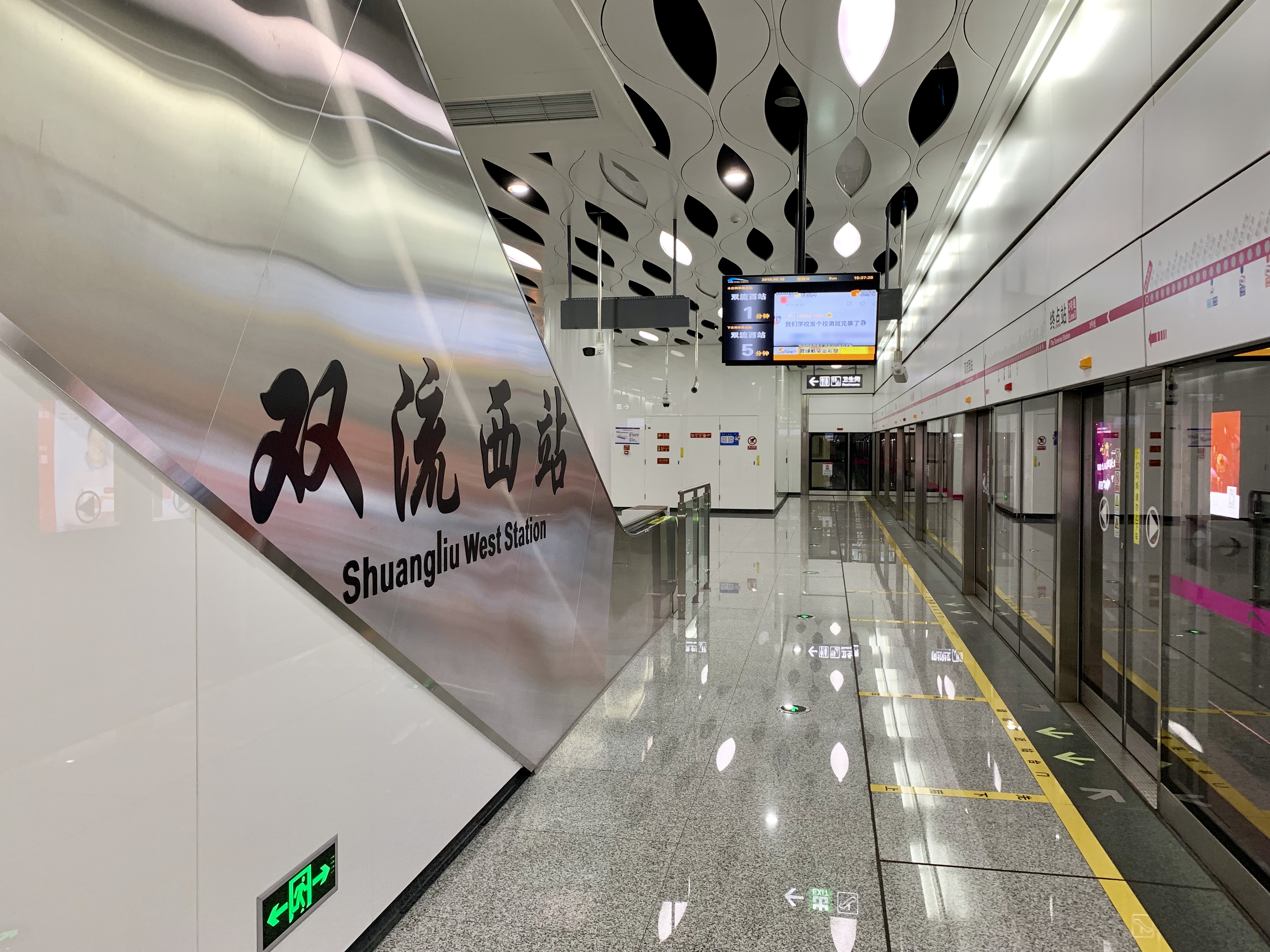

General information
- Location: Shuangliu District, Chengdu, Sichuan; China
- Operated by: Chengdu Metro Limited
- Lines: Line 3 Line 10
- Platforms: 4 (2 island platforms)

Other information
- Station code: 0337 1013

History
- Opened: 26 December 2018
- Previous names: Shuangliu West Station

Services
Preceding station	Chengdu Metro	Following station
Sanliba towards Chengdu Medical College	Line 3	Terminus
Terminal 2 of Shuangliu International Airport towards Wuhou Shrine	Line 10	Yingtian Temple towards Xinping
Location

Shuangliu West Railway Station (Chinese: 双流西站), formerly known as Shuangliu West Station, is a transfer station on Line 3 and Line 10 of the Chengdu Metro. It serves the nearby Shuangliu West railway station.

=== Station layout ===
G	Entrances and Exits	Exits A-E, Faregates, Station Agent
B1	Northbound	← Line 3 towards Chengdu Medical College (Sanliba)
B1	Island platform, doors open on the left
B1	Southbound	Line 3 termination track →
B1	Northbound	← Line 10 towards Taipingyuan (Terminal 2 of Shuangliu International Airport)
B1	Island platform, doors open on the left
B1	Southbound	Line 10 towards Xinping (Yingtian Temple) →

=== Gallery ===
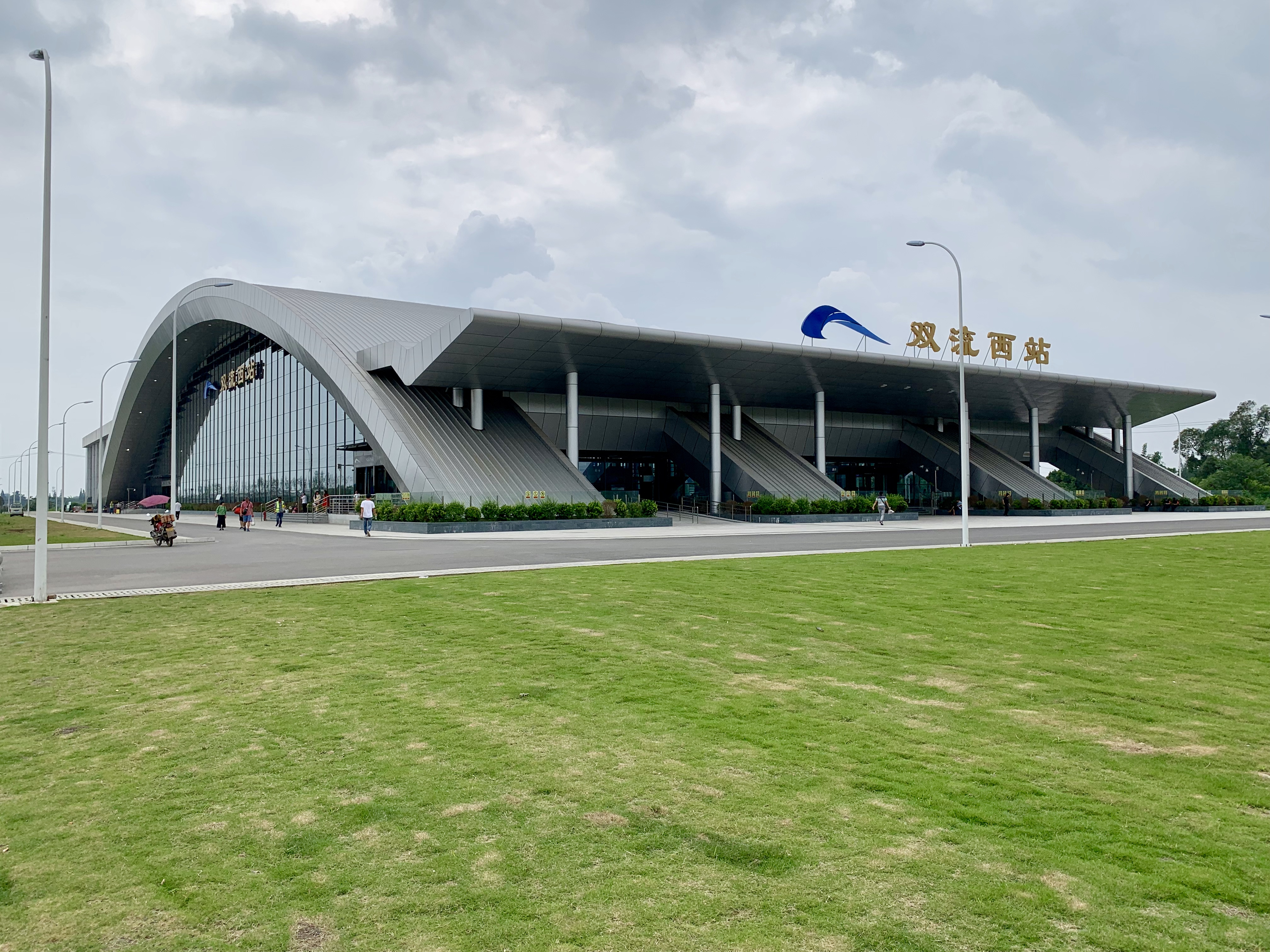
Exterior

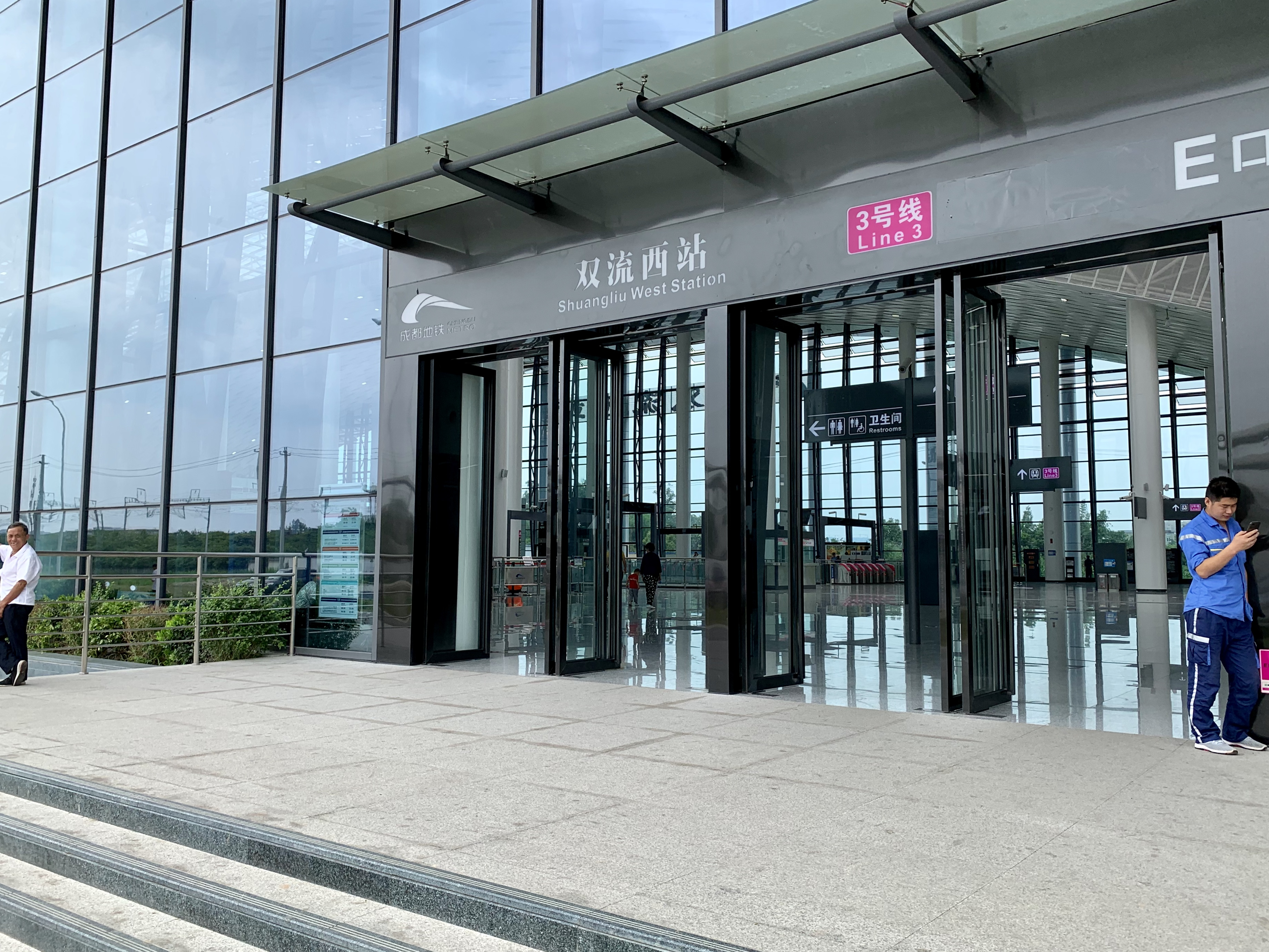
Entrance E

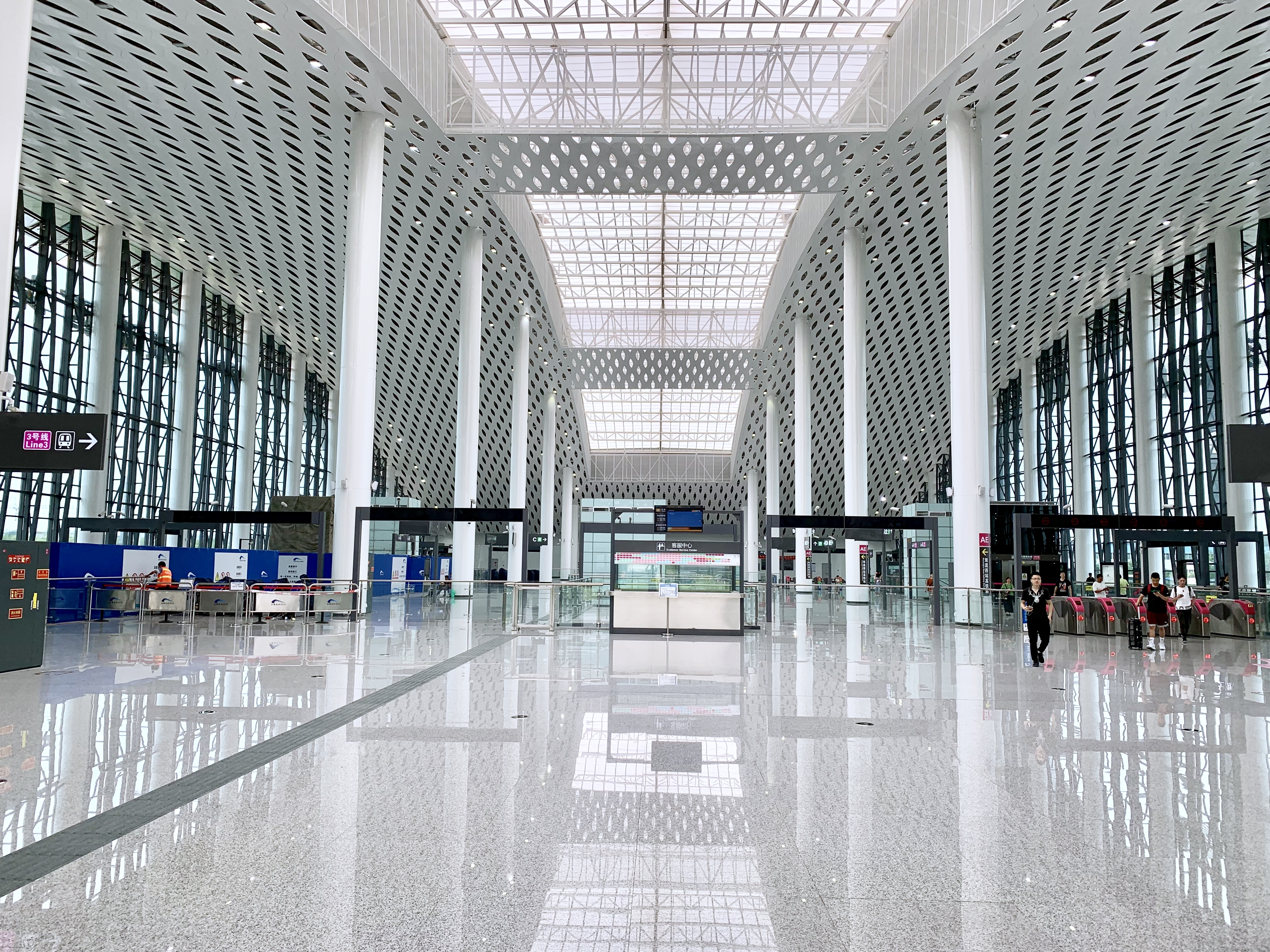
Concourse

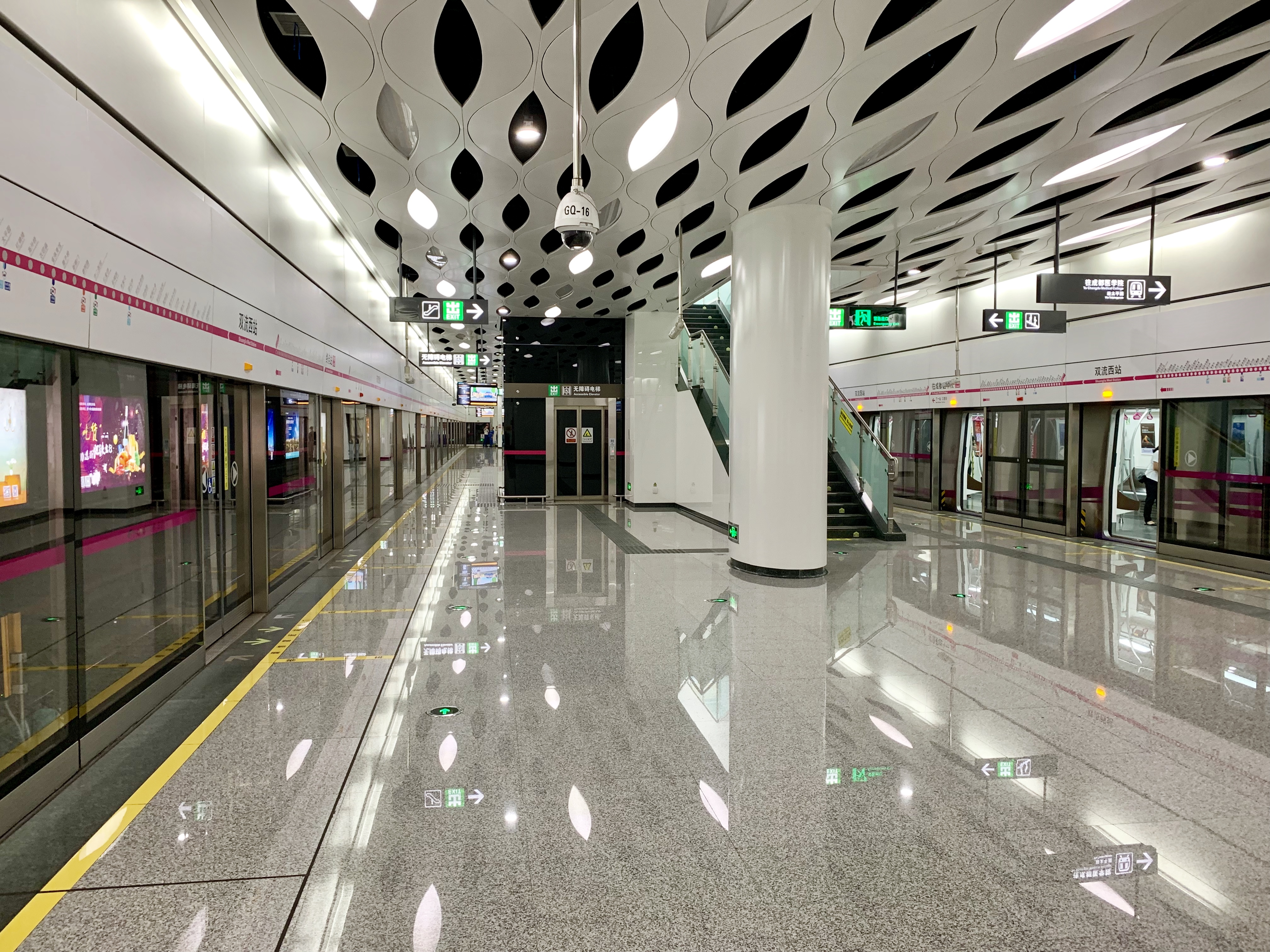
Line 3 platform
