= Chengdu Medical College station =

Station on Line 3 of the Chengdu Metro in China

Chengdu Medical College 成都医学院
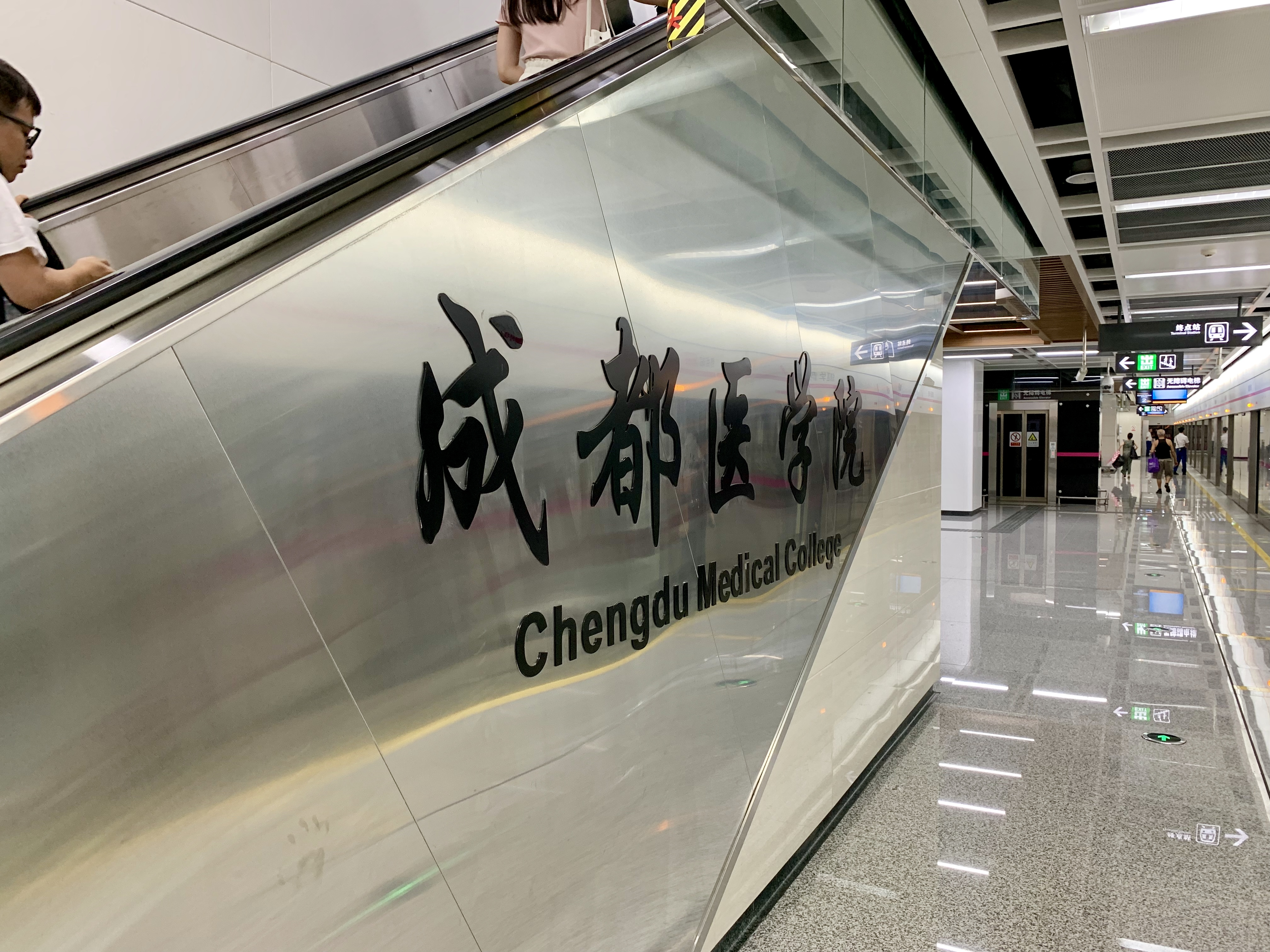

General information
- Location: Xindu District, Chengdu, Sichuan; China
- Coordinates: 30.8193°N 104.19222°E
- Operated by: Chengdu Metro Limited
- Line(s): Line 3
- Platforms: 2 (1 island platform)

Other information
- Station code: 0301

History
- Opened: 26 December 2018

Services
Preceding station	Chengdu Metro	Following station
Terminus	Line 3	Southwest Petroleum University towards Shuangliu West Railway Station

Chengdu Medical College (Chinese: 成都医学院) is a station on Line 3 of the Chengdu Metro in China. It serves the nearby Chengdu Medical College Xindu Campus and it is the northern terminus of Line 3.

== Station layout ==
G	Entrances and Exits	Exits A-D
B1	Concourse	Faregates, Station Agent
B2	Northbound	← Line 3 termination track
B2	Island platform, doors open on the left
B2	Southbound	Line 3 towards Shuangliu West Station (Southwest Petroleum University) →

== Gallery ==
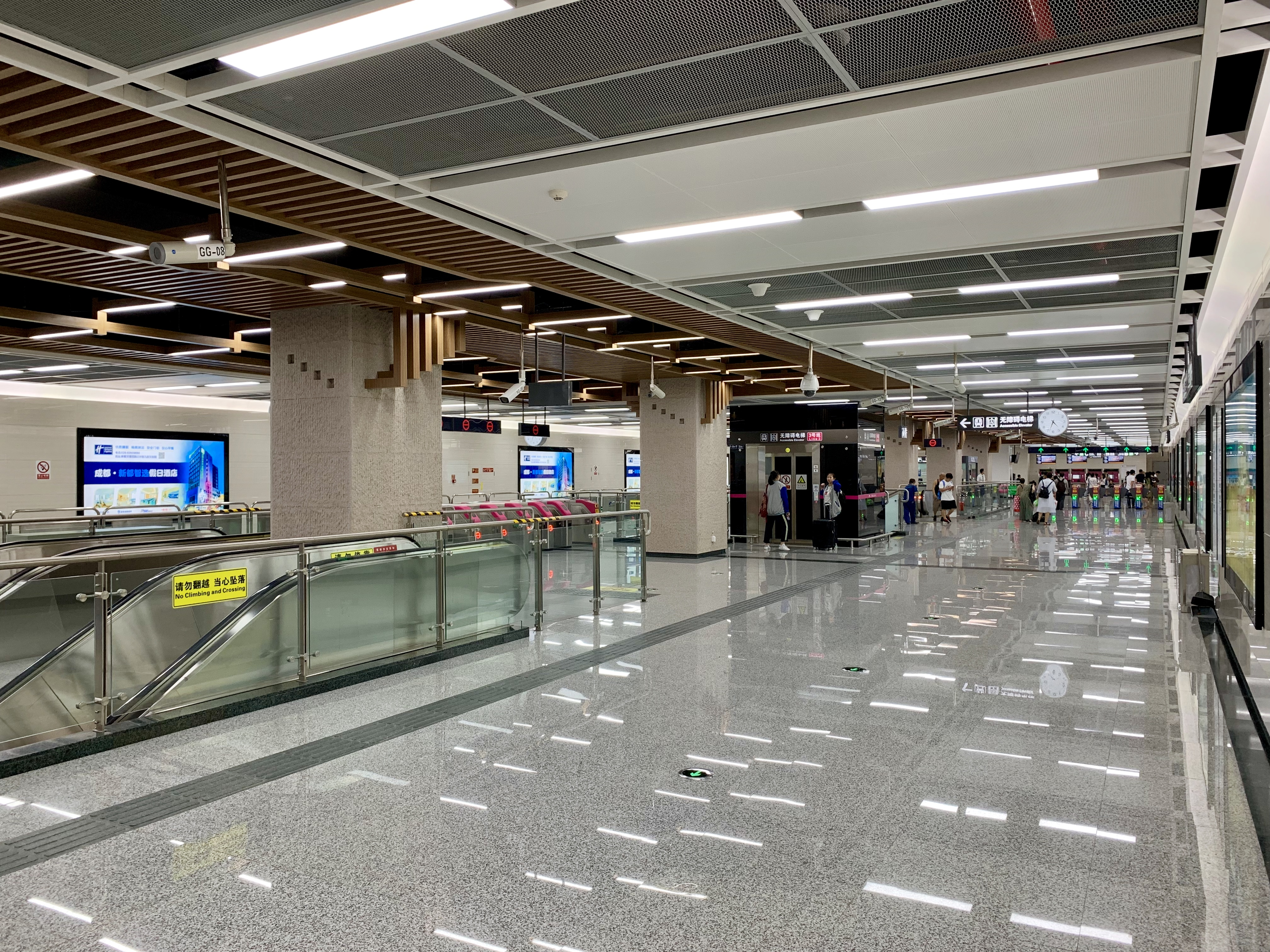
Concourse

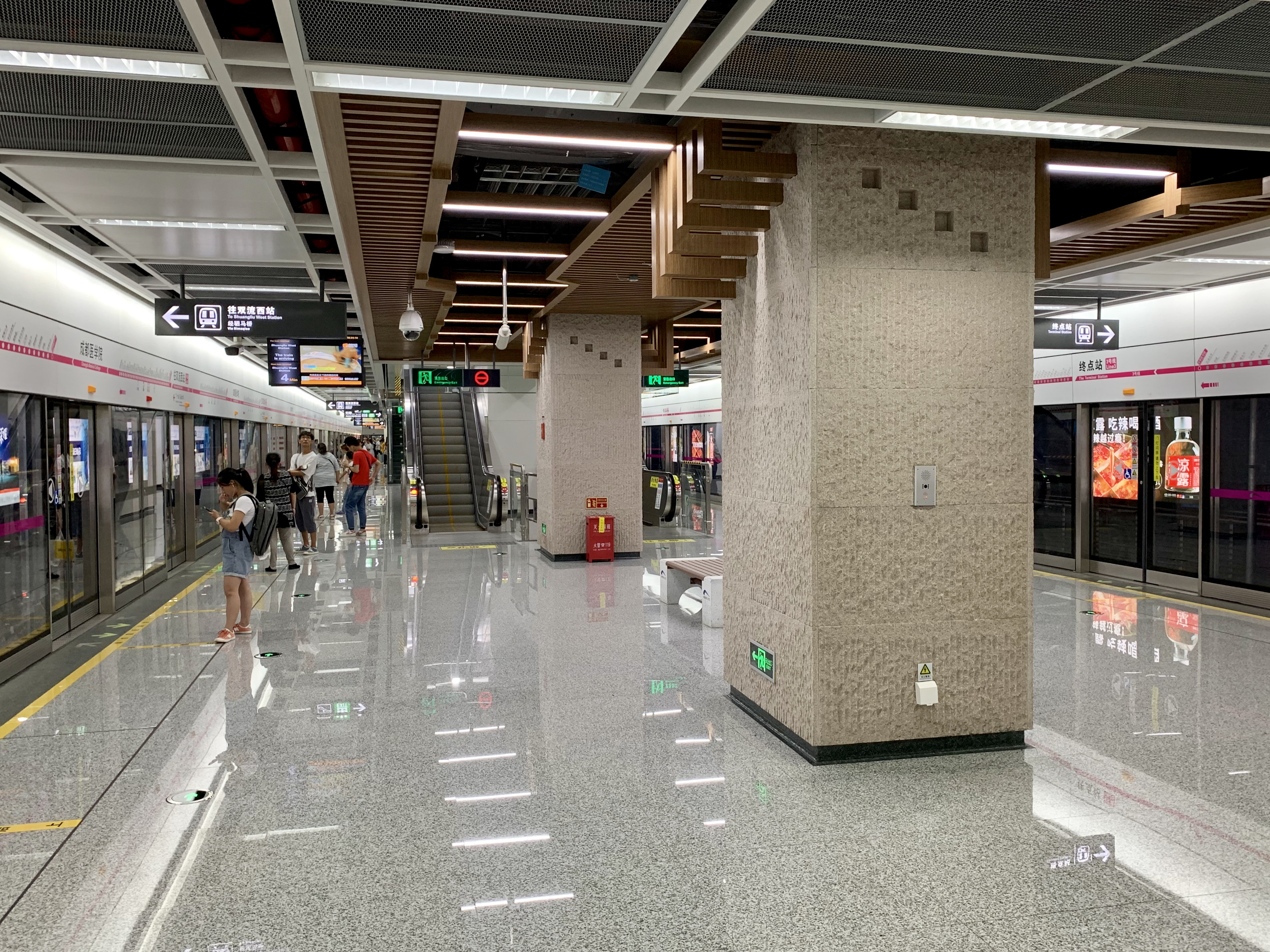
Platform
