= Jinjiang Hotel =

Jinjiang Hotel may refer to:

- Sichuan Jinjiang Hotel, a state guest house and official reception hotel in Chengdu, Sichuan, China
  - Jinjiang Hotel station
- Shanghai Jinjiang Hotel, a for-profit hotel in Shanghai, China
