= Xinnanmen station =

Metro station in Chengdu, China

Coordinates: 30°38′42.1″N 104°04′27.1″E

Xinnanmen 新南门
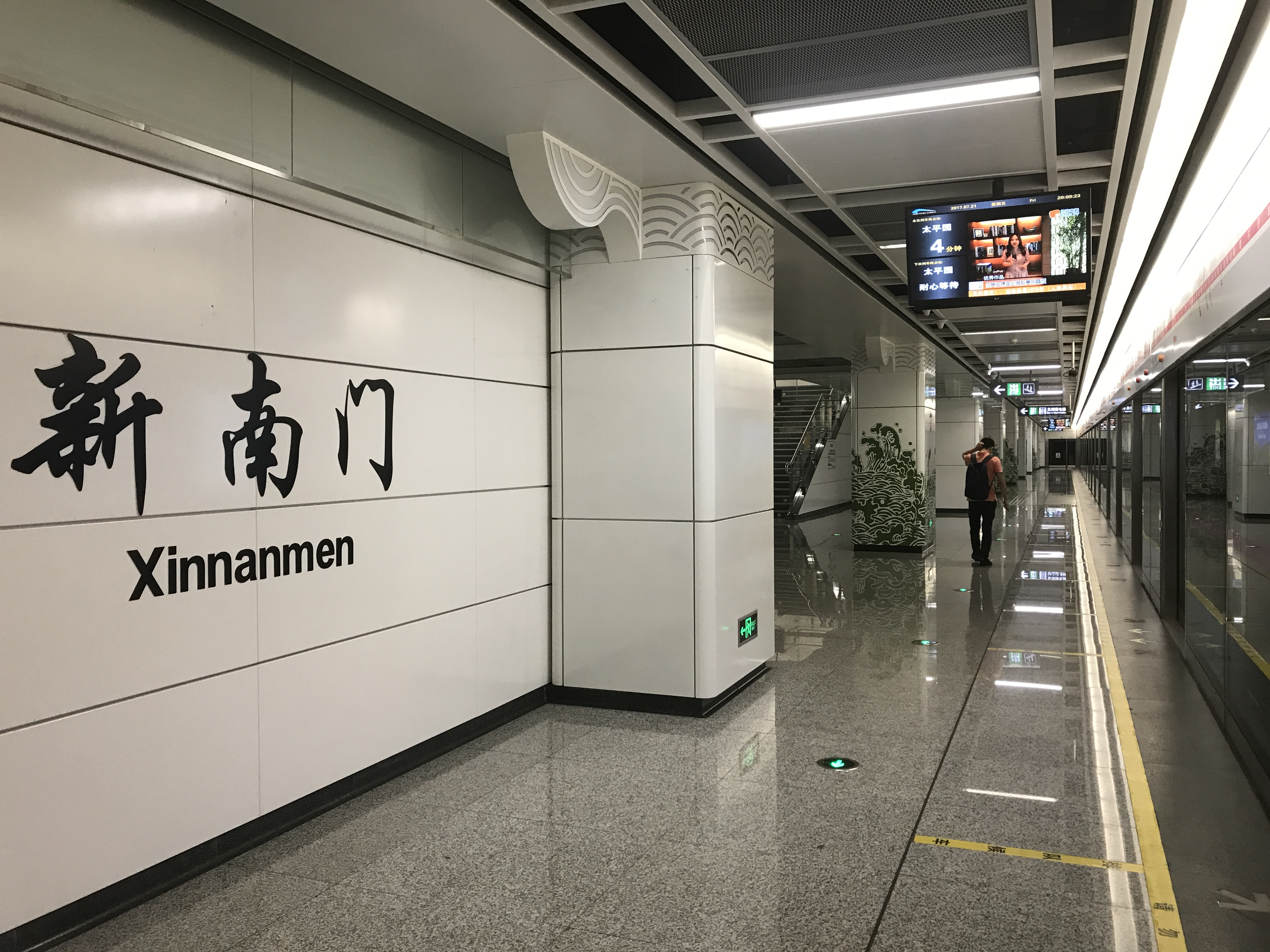

General information
- Location: Jinjiang District, Chengdu, Sichuan; China
- Operator: Chengdu Metro Limited
- Lines: Line 3 Line 13
- Platforms: 4 (2 island platforms)

Other information
- Station code: 0320; 1310

History
- Opened: 31 July 2016 (Line 3); 16 December 2025 (Line 13)

Services
Preceding station	Chengdu Metro	Following station
Chunxi Road towards Chengdu Medical College	Line 3	Moziqiao towards Shuangliu West Railway Station
Jiuyan Bridge towards Long'an	Line 13	Huaxiba towards Wayaotan
Location

Xinnanmen (Chinese: 新南门) is an interchange station on Line 3 and Line 13 of the Chengdu Metro in China.

== Station layout ==
G	Entrances and Exits	Exits A-E, F1, F2
B1	Concourse	Faregates, Station Agent
B2	Northbound	← Line 3 towards Chengdu Medical College (Chunxi Road)
B2	Island platform, doors open on the left
B2	Southbound	Line 3 towards Shuangliu West Station (Moziqiao) →
B4	Eastbound	← Line 13 to Long'an (Jiuyan Bridge)
B4	Island platform, doors open on the left
B4	Westbound	Line 13 to Wayaotan (Huaxiba) →

== Gallery ==
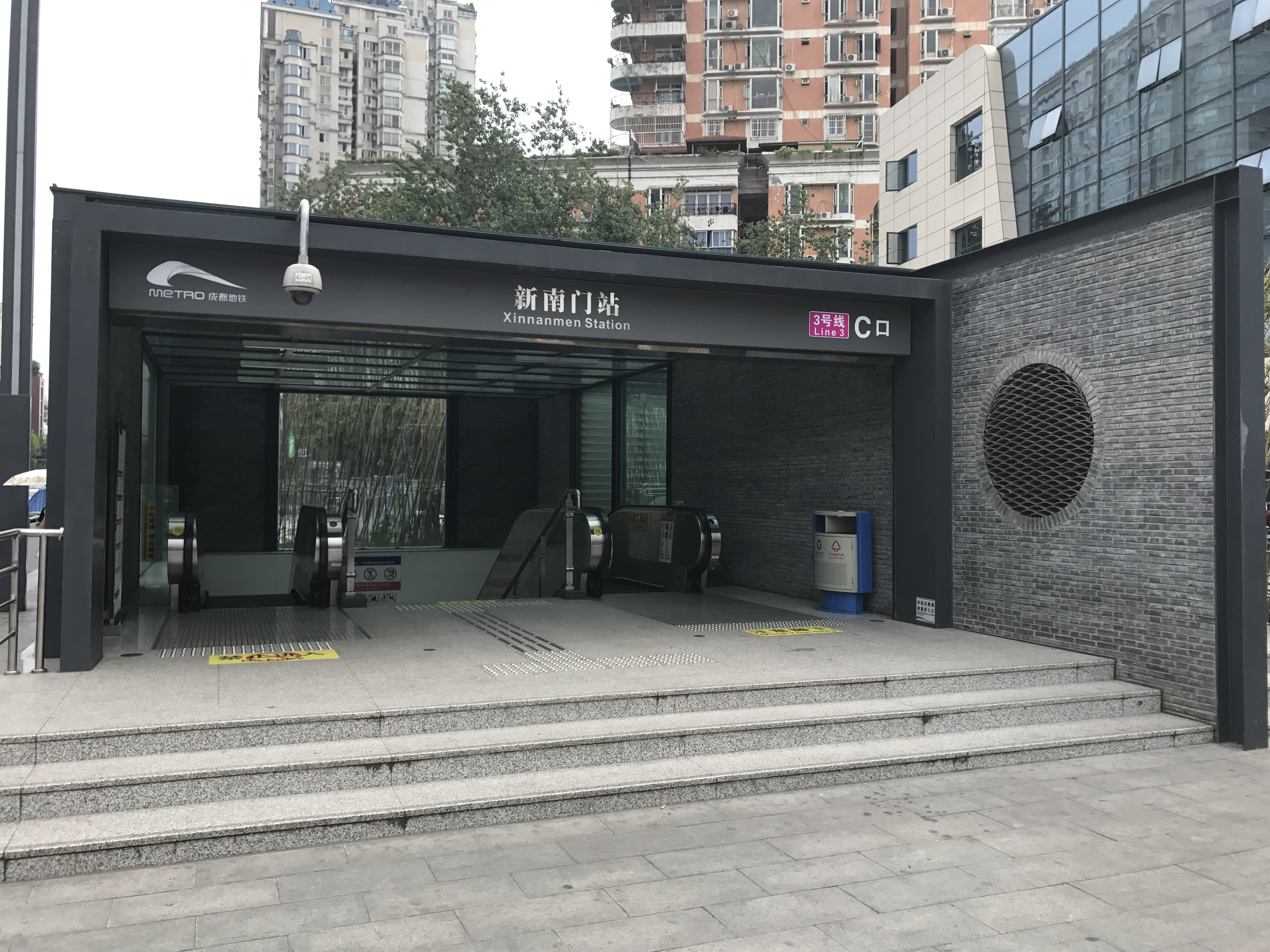
Entrance C

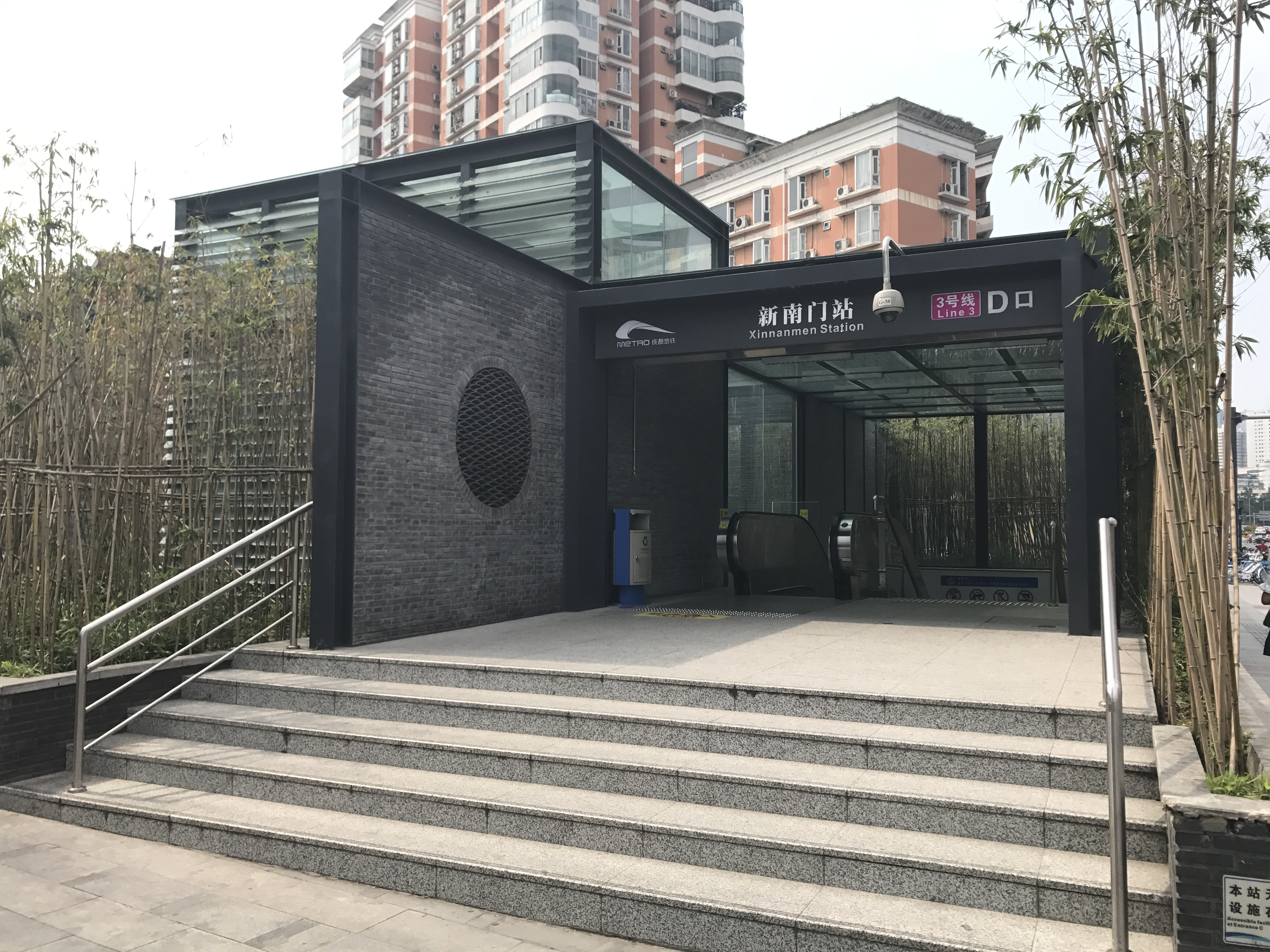
Entrance D

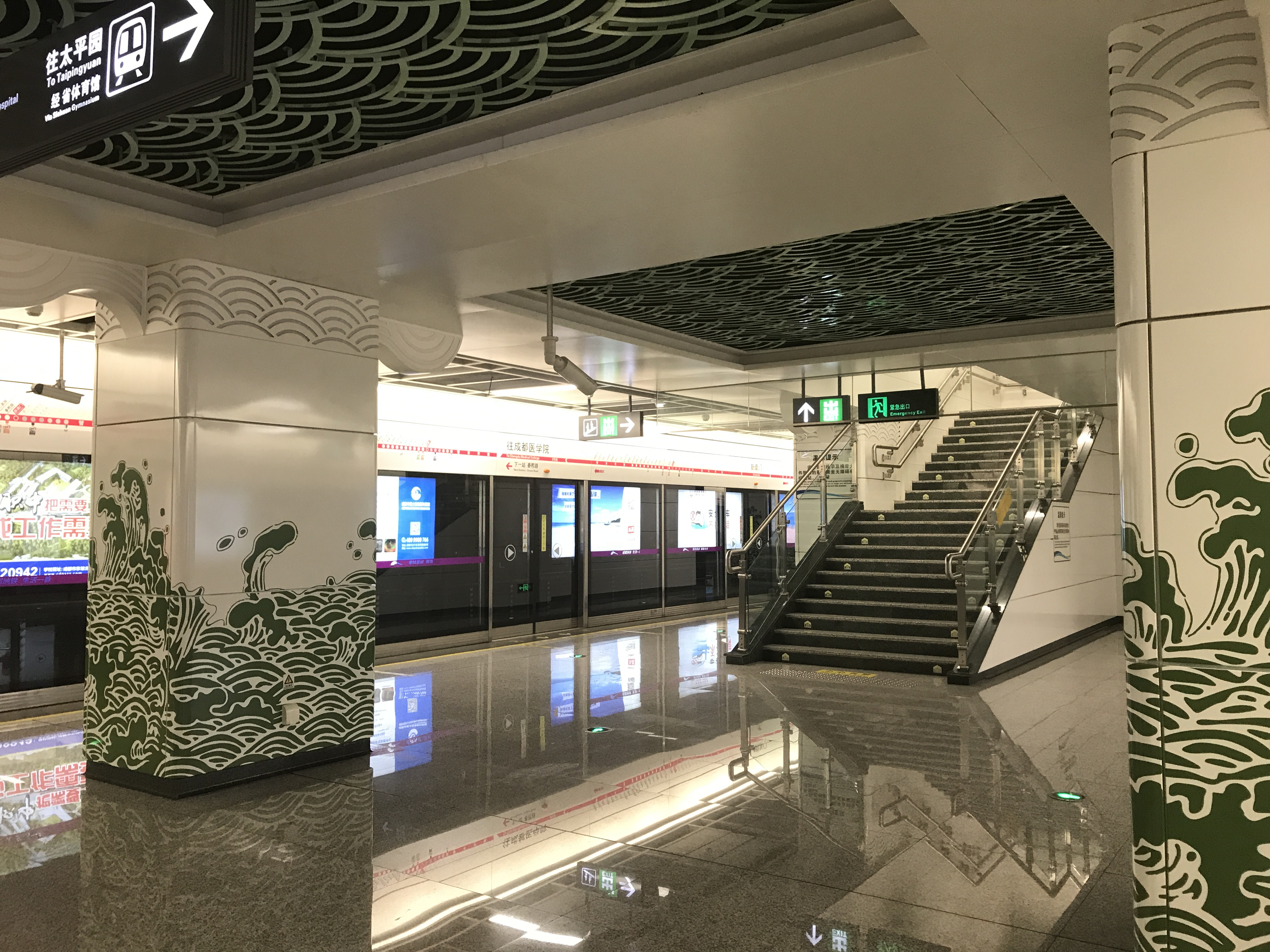
Platform
