= Yiguanmiao station =

Metro station in Chengdu, China

Yiguanmiao 衣冠庙
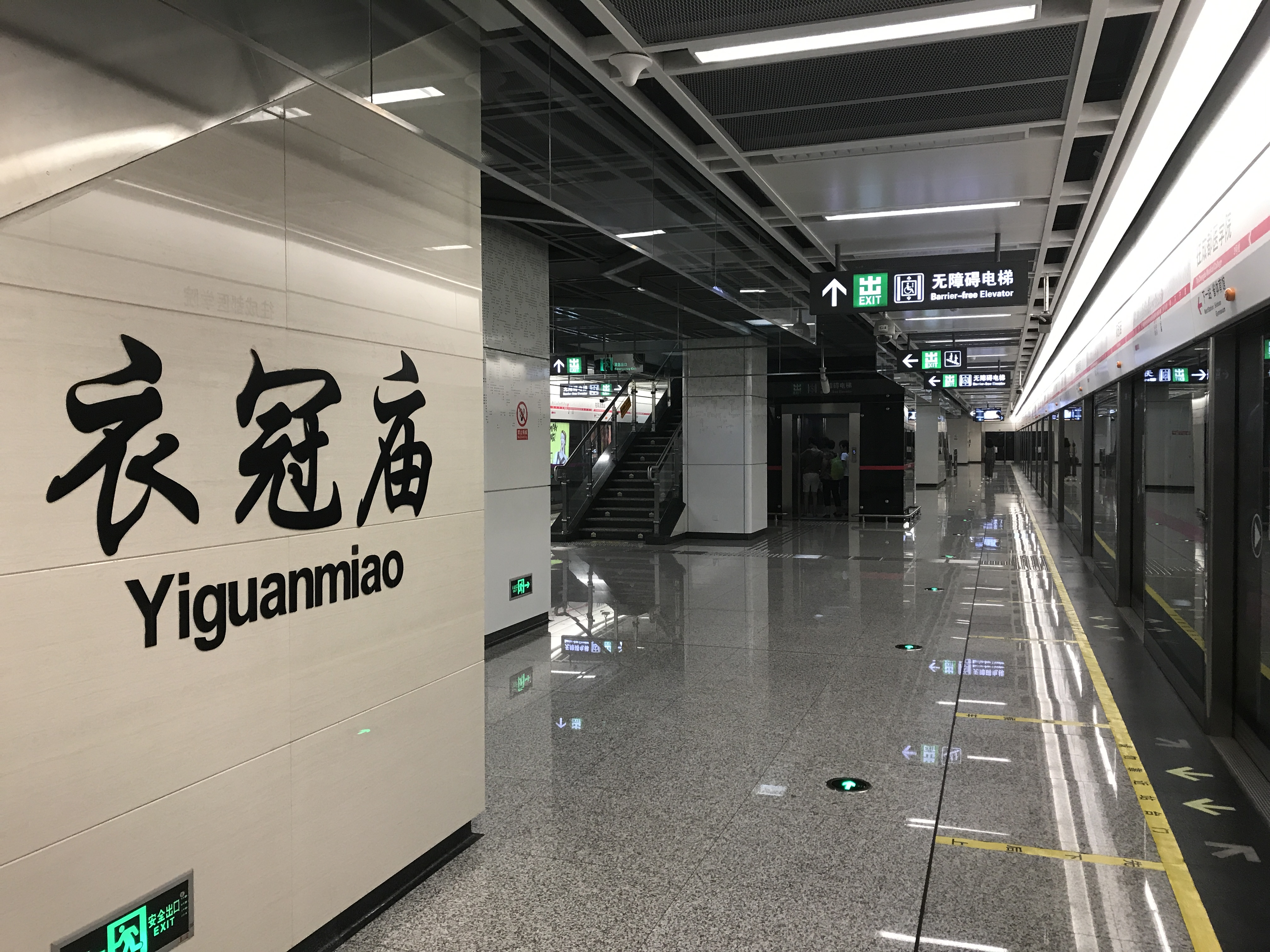

General information
- Location: Wuhou District, Chengdu, Sichuan; China
- Operated by: Chengdu Metro Limited
- Line: Line 3
- Platforms: 2 (1 island platform)

Other information
- Station code: 0323

History
- Opened: 31 July 2016

Services
| Preceding station | Chengdu Metro | Following station |
|---|---|---|
| Sichuan Gymnasium towards Chengdu Medical College | Line 3 | Gaoshengqiao towards Shuangliu West Railway Station |
Location

Yiguanmiao (Chinese: 衣冠庙) is a station on Line 3 of the Chengdu Metro in China.

== Station layout ==
| G | Entrances and Exits | Exits A-D |
| B1 | Concourse | Faregates, Station Agent |
| B2 | Northbound | ← Line 3 towards Chengdu Medical College (Sichuan Gymnasium) |
| B2 | Island platform, doors open on the left |
| B2 | Southbound | Line 3 towards Shuangliu West Station (Gaoshengqiao) → |

== Gallery ==
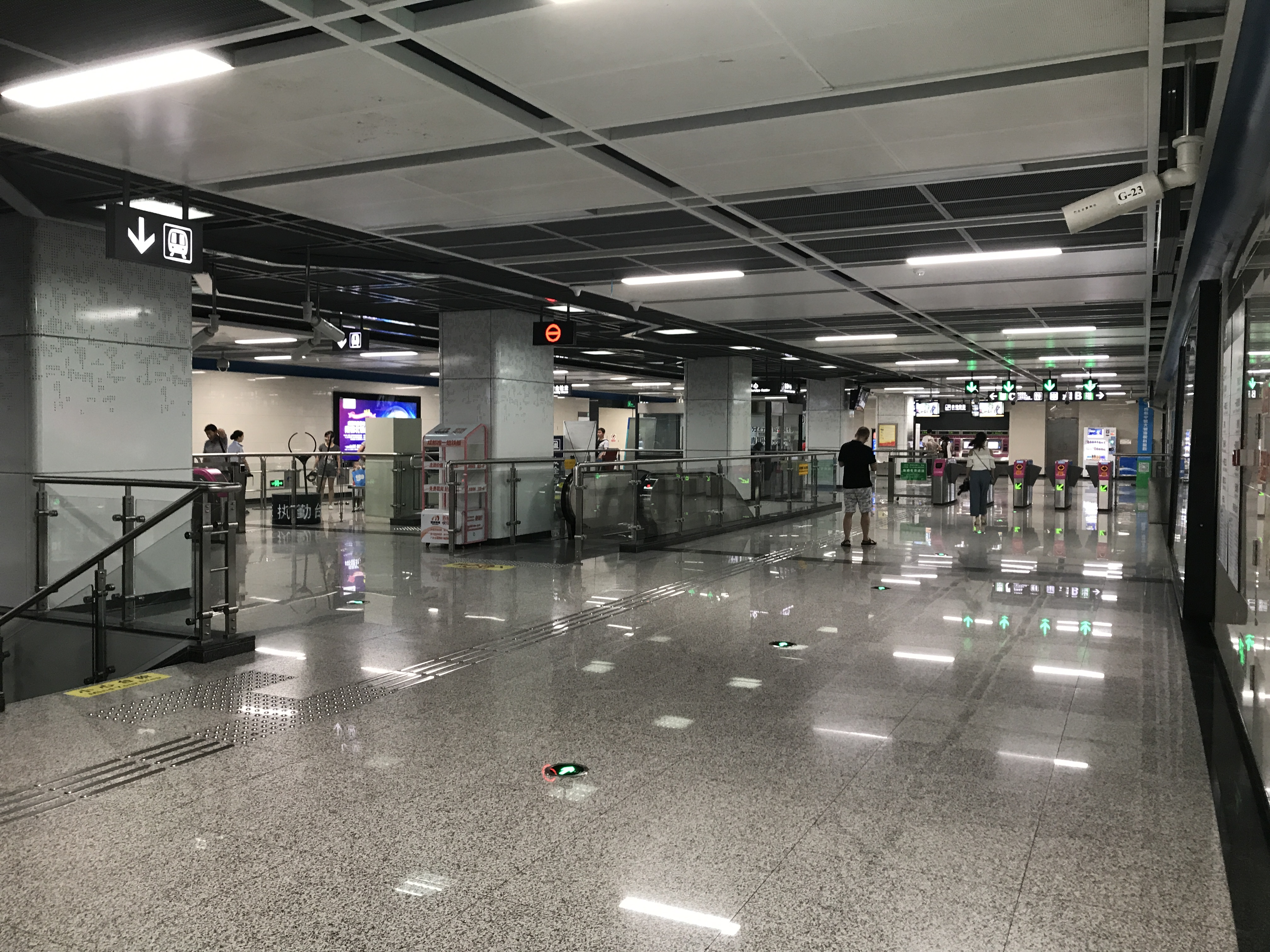
Concourse

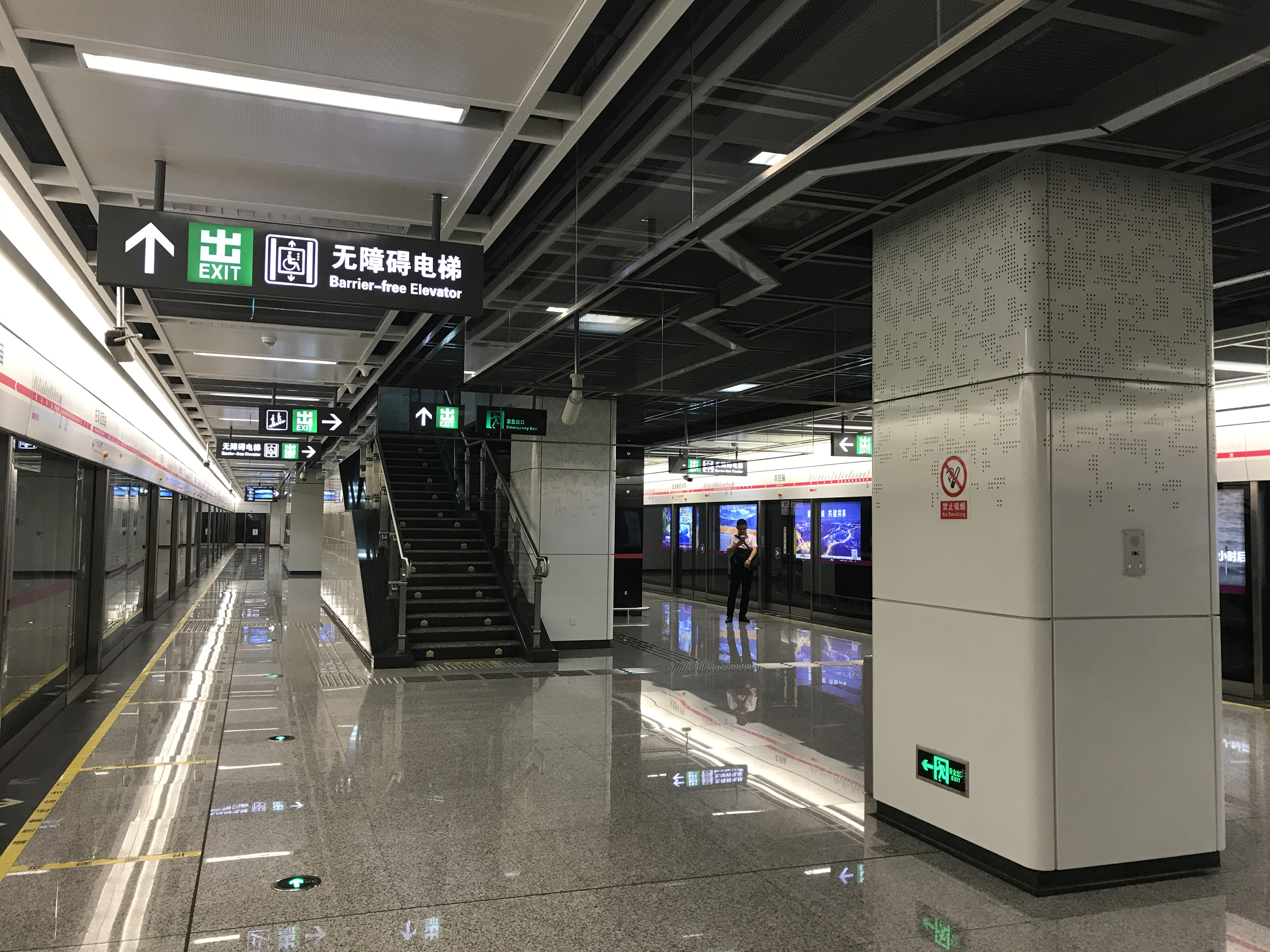
Platform
