= Sichuan Gymnasium station =

Metro station in Chengdu, China

Sichuan Gymnasium 省体育馆
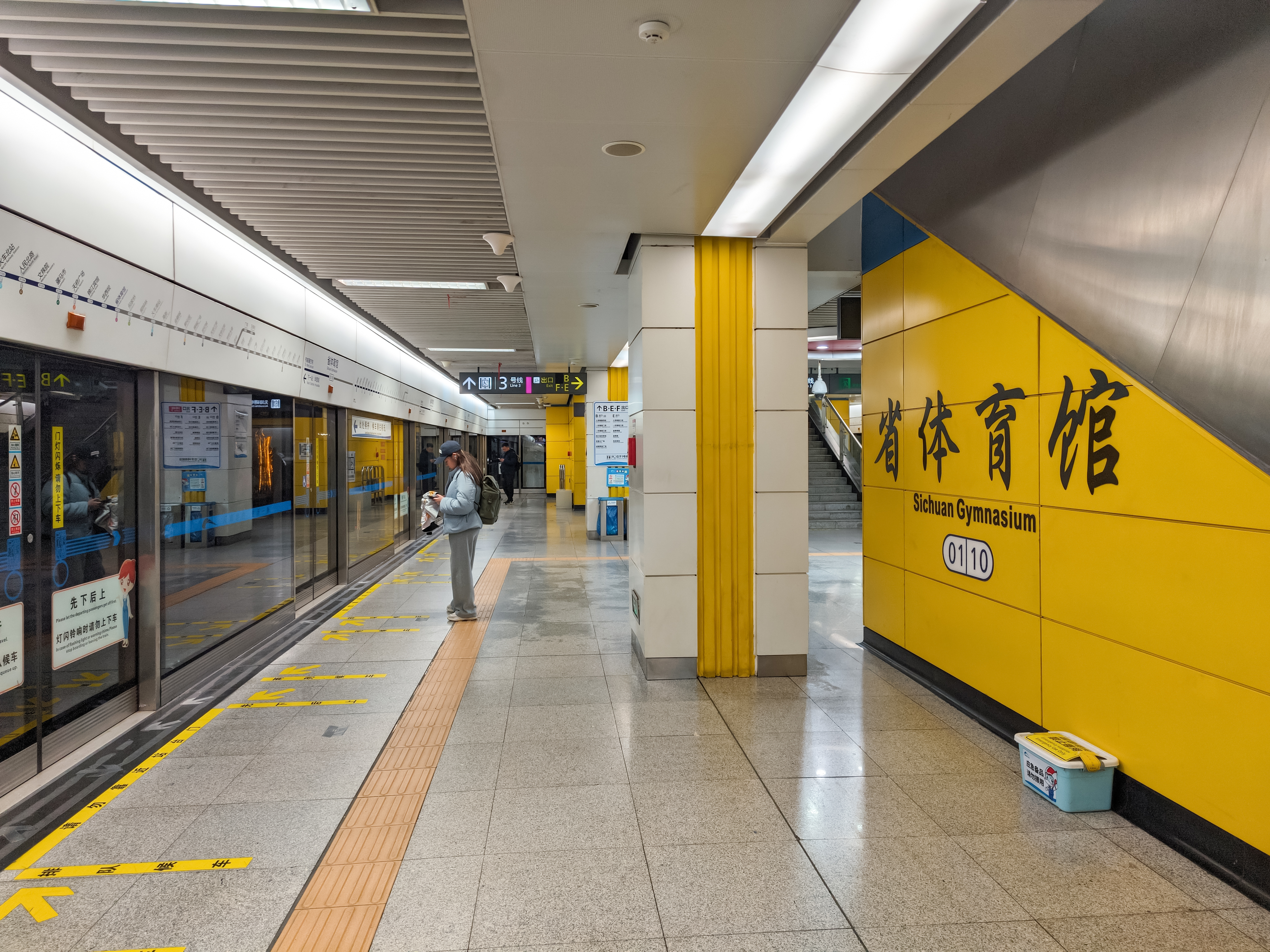

General information
- Location: Wuhou District, Chengdu, Sichuan; China
- Coordinates: 30.6326°N 104.06111°E
- Operator: Chengdu Metro Limited
- Lines: Line 1 Line 3
- Platforms: 4 (2 island platforms)

Other information
- Station code: 0110 0322

History
- Opened: 27 September 2010

Services
Preceding station	Chengdu Metro	Following station
Huaxiba towards Weijianian	Line 1	Nijiaqiao towards Science City or Wugensong
Moziqiao towards Chengdu Medical College	Line 3	Yiguanmiao towards Shuangliu West Railway Station
Location

Sichuan Gymnasium (Chinese: 省体育馆) is an interchange station on Line 1 and Line 3 of the Chengdu Metro in China. It serves the nearby Sichuan Provincial Gymnasium.

== Station layout ==
G	Entrances and Exits	Exits A, B, E, F
B1	Concourse	Shops, Station Agent
B2	Concourse	Faregates, Station Agent
B3	Northbound	← Line 1 towards Weijianian (Huaxiba)
B3	Island platform, doors open on the left
B3	Southbound	Line 1 towards Science City (Nijiaqiao) →
B4	Northbound	← Line 3 towards Chengdu Medical College (Moziqiao)
B4	Island platform, doors open on the left
B4	Southbound	Line 3 towards Shuangliu West Station (Yiguanmiao) →

== Gallery ==
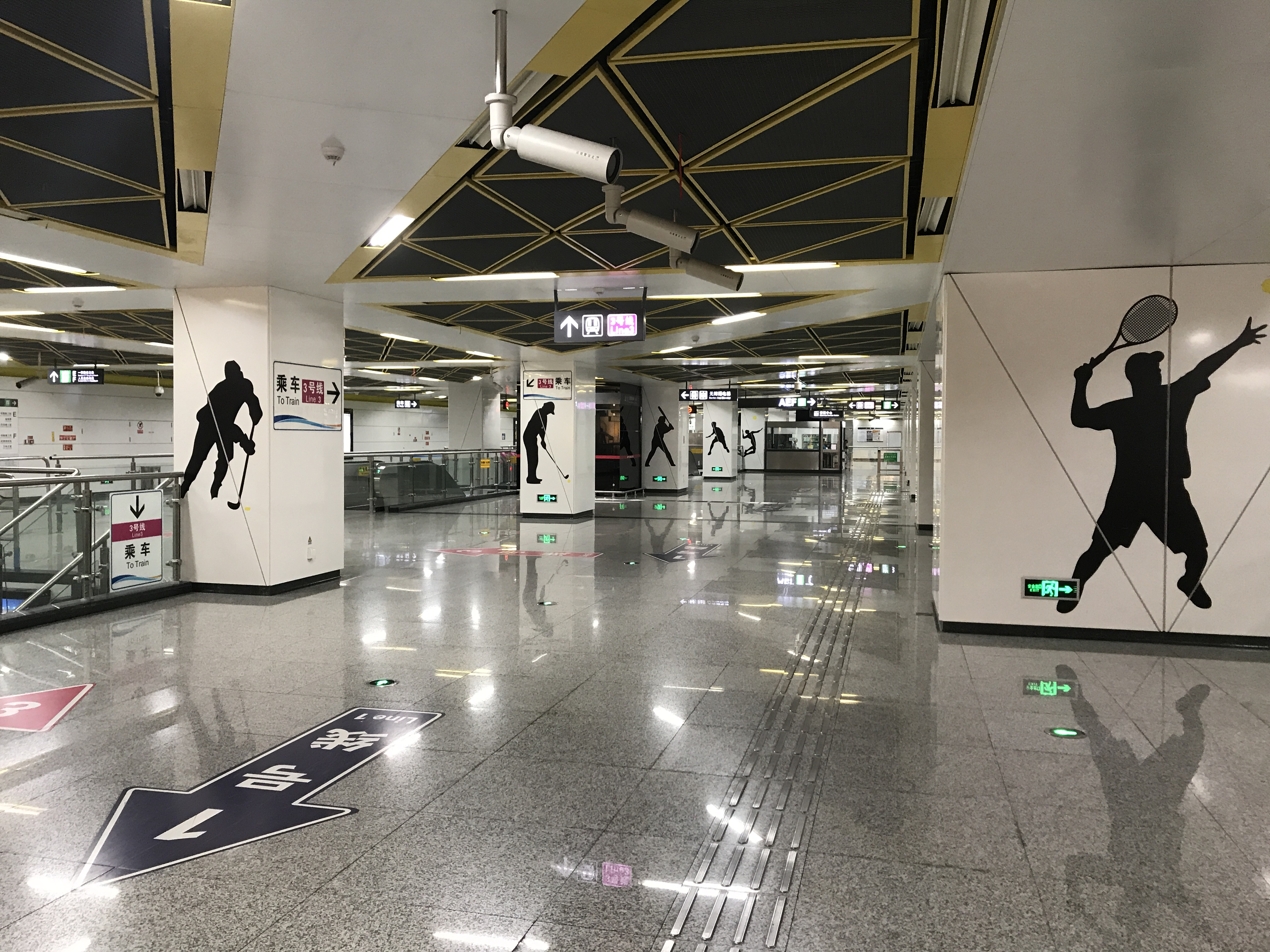
Concourse

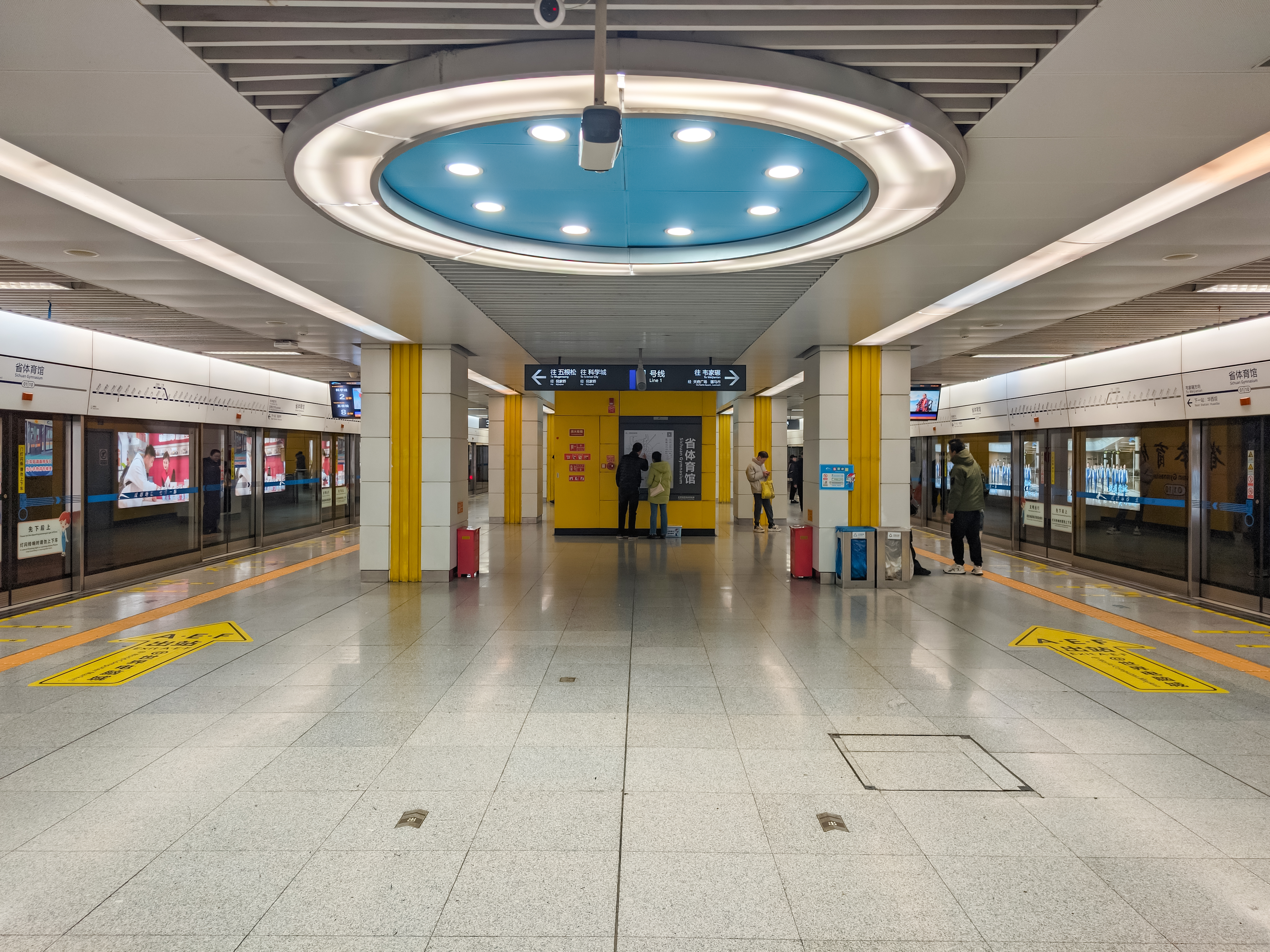
Line 1 platform

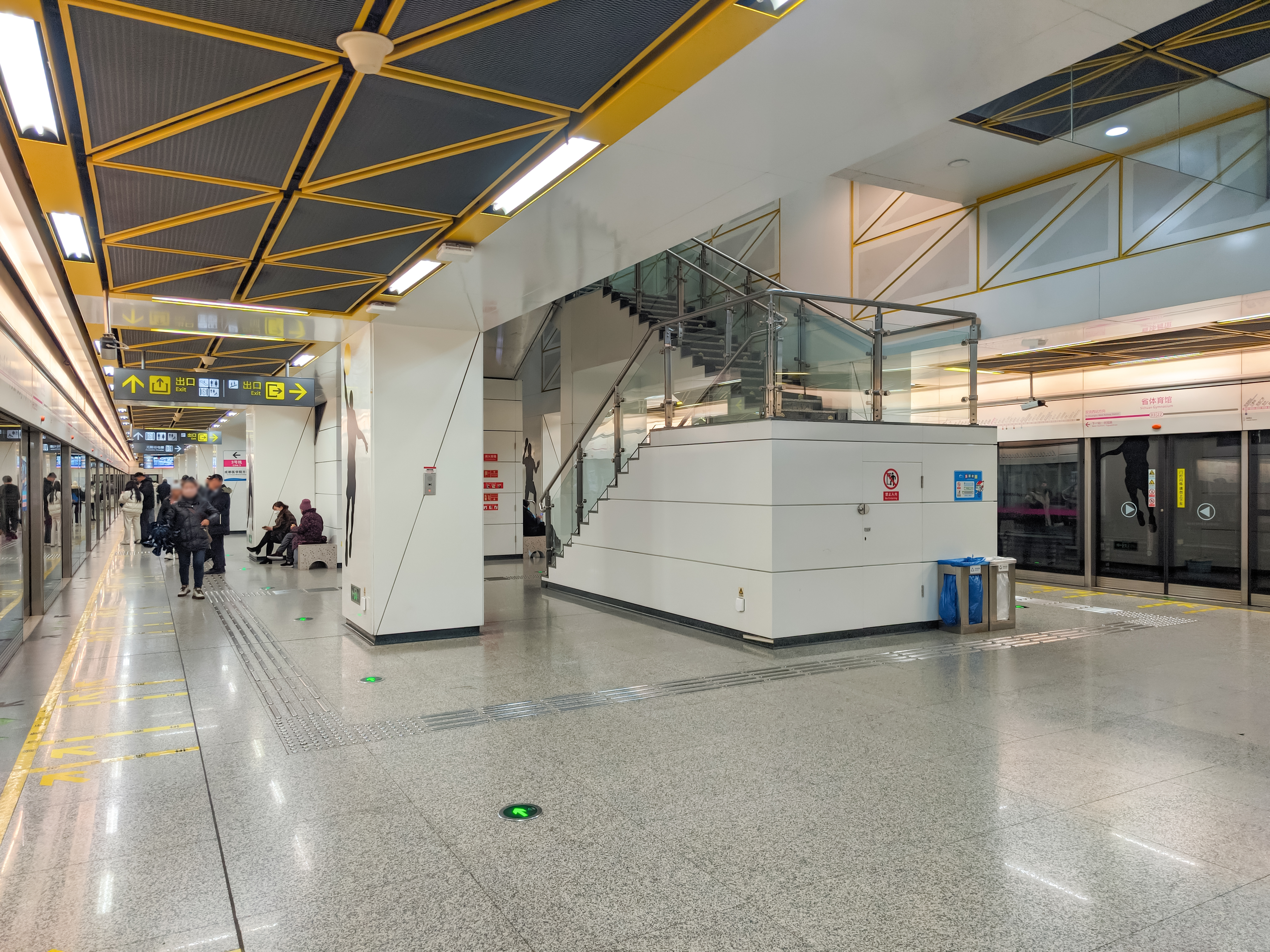
Line 3 platform
