= Huaxiba station =

Metro station in Chengdu, China

Huaxiba 华西坝
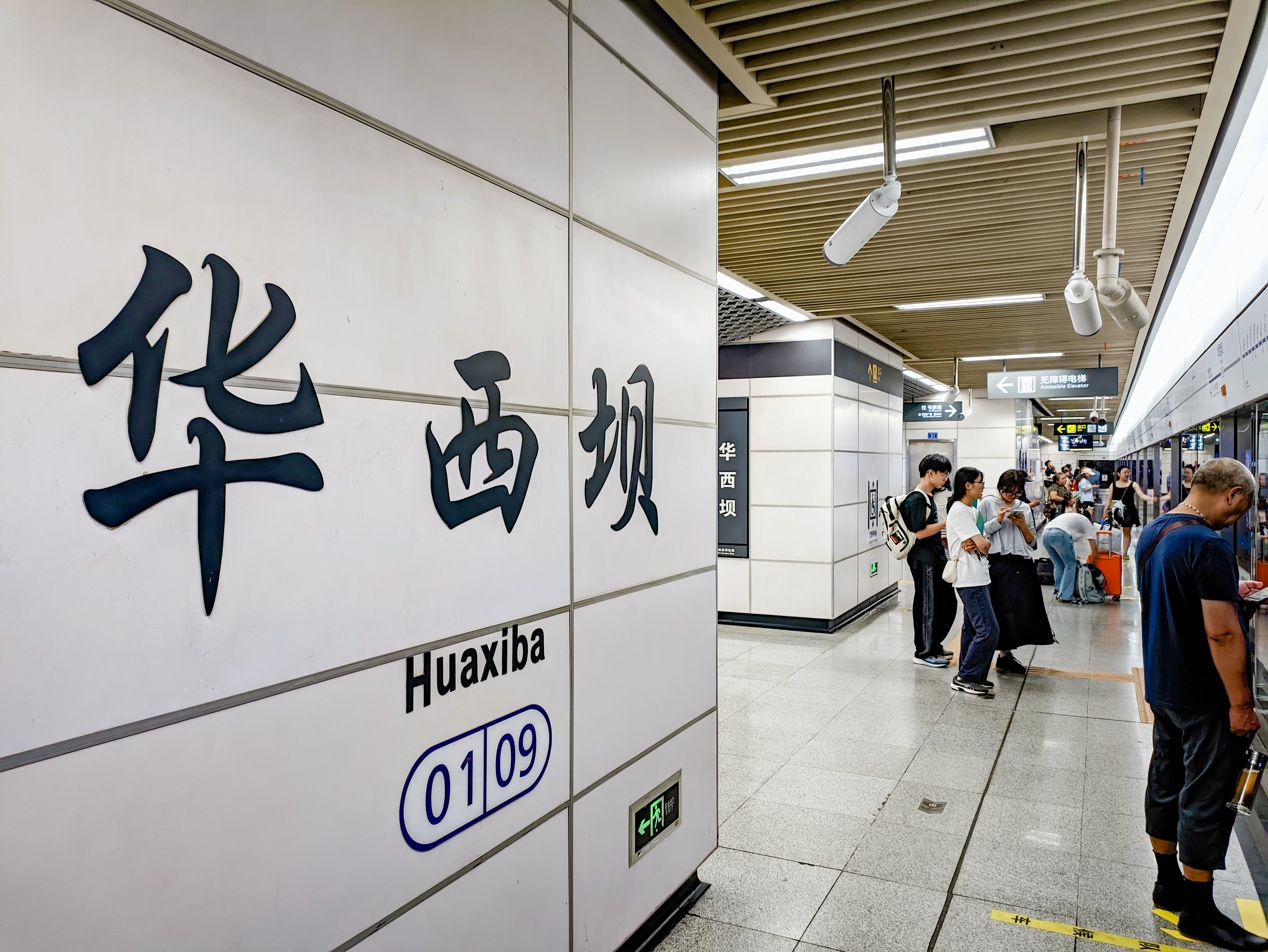

General information
- Location: Wuhou District, Chengdu, Sichuan; China
- Coordinates: 30.6422°N 104.0664°E
- Operator: Chengdu Metro Limited
- Lines: Line 1 Line 13
- Platforms: 4 (2 island platforms)

Other information
- Station code: 0109; 1311

History
- Opened: 27 September 2010 (Line 1); 16 December 2025 (Line 13)

Services
Preceding station	Chengdu Metro	Following station
Jinjiang Hotel towards Weijianian	Line 1	Sichuan Gymnasium towards Science City or Wugensong
Xinnanmen towards Long'an	Line 13	Wenweng Shishi towards Wayaotan
Location

Huaxiba (Chinese: 华西坝) is an interchange station on Line 1 and Line 13 of the Chengdu Metro in China. It is located near the Huaxi Campus of Sichuan University.

== Station layout ==
G	Entrances and Exits	Exits A-F
B1	Concourse	Faregates, Station Agent
B2	Northbound	← Line 1 towards Weijianian (Jinjiang Hotel)
B2	Island platform, doors open on the left
B2	Southbound	Line 1 towards Science City (Sichuan Gymnasium) →
B3	Eastbound	← Line 13 to Long'an (Xinnanmen)
B3	Island platform, doors open on the left
B3	Westbound	Line 13 to Wayaotan (Wenweng Shishi) →

== Gallery ==
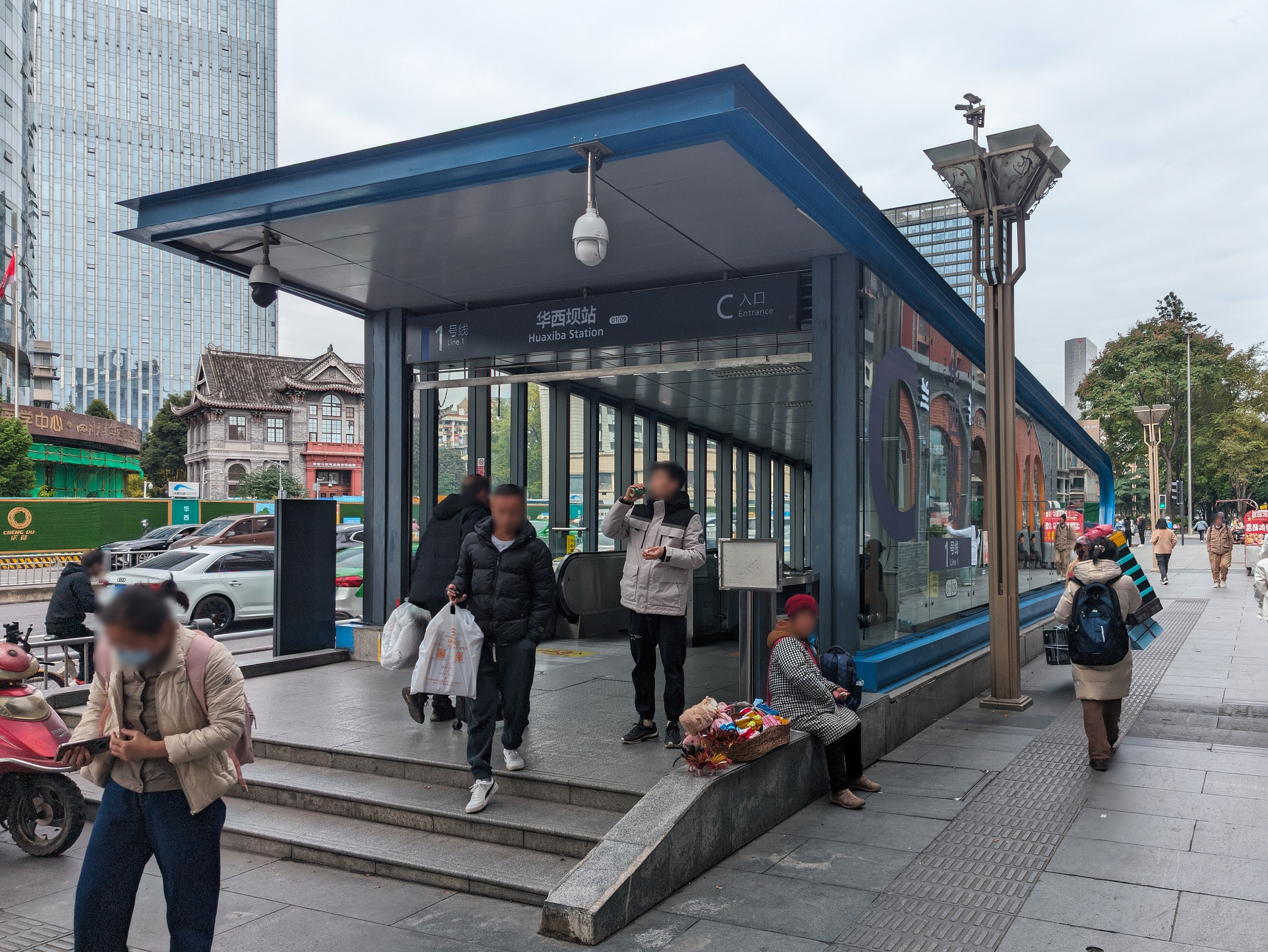
Entrance C

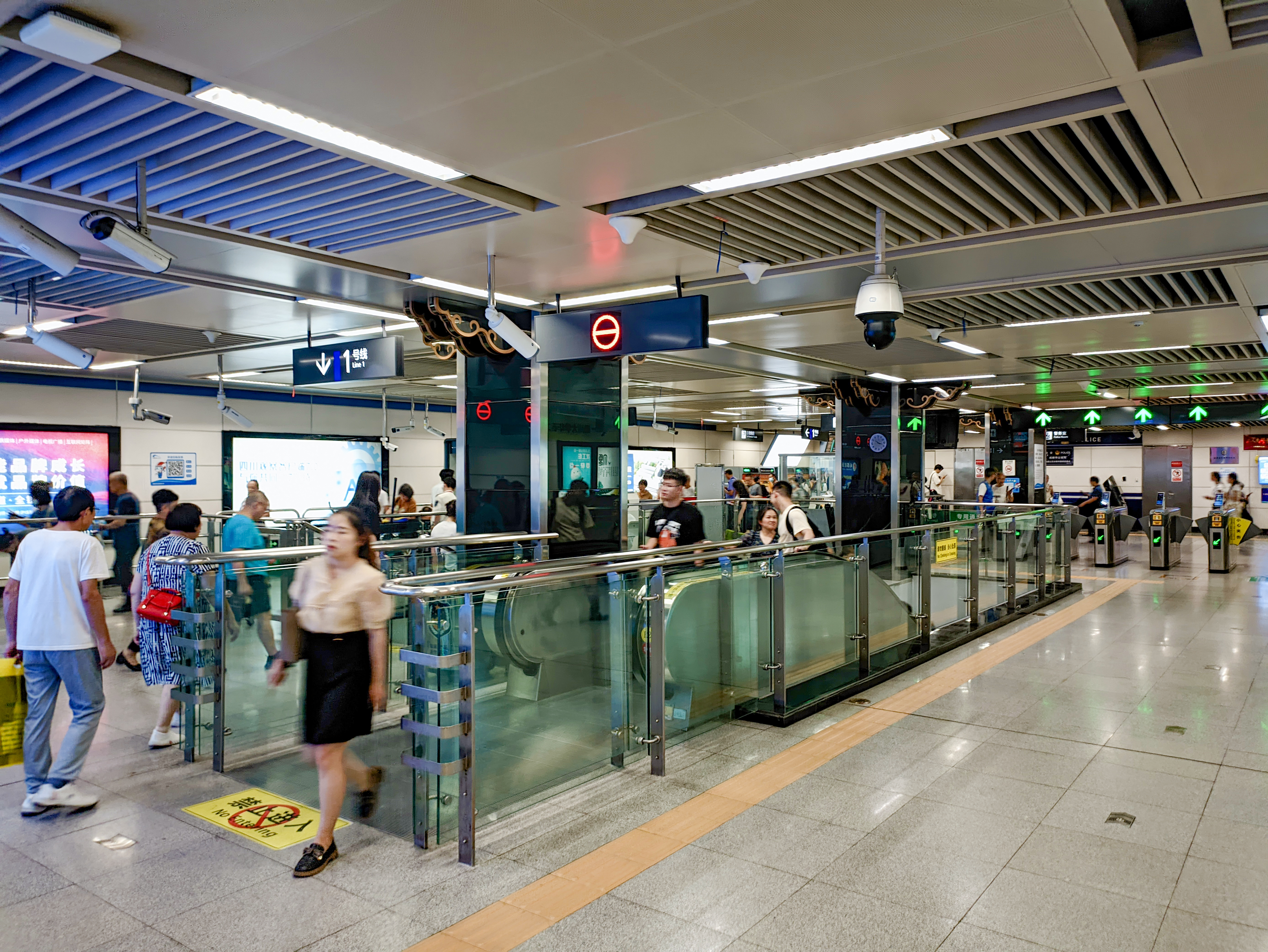
Line 1 Concourse

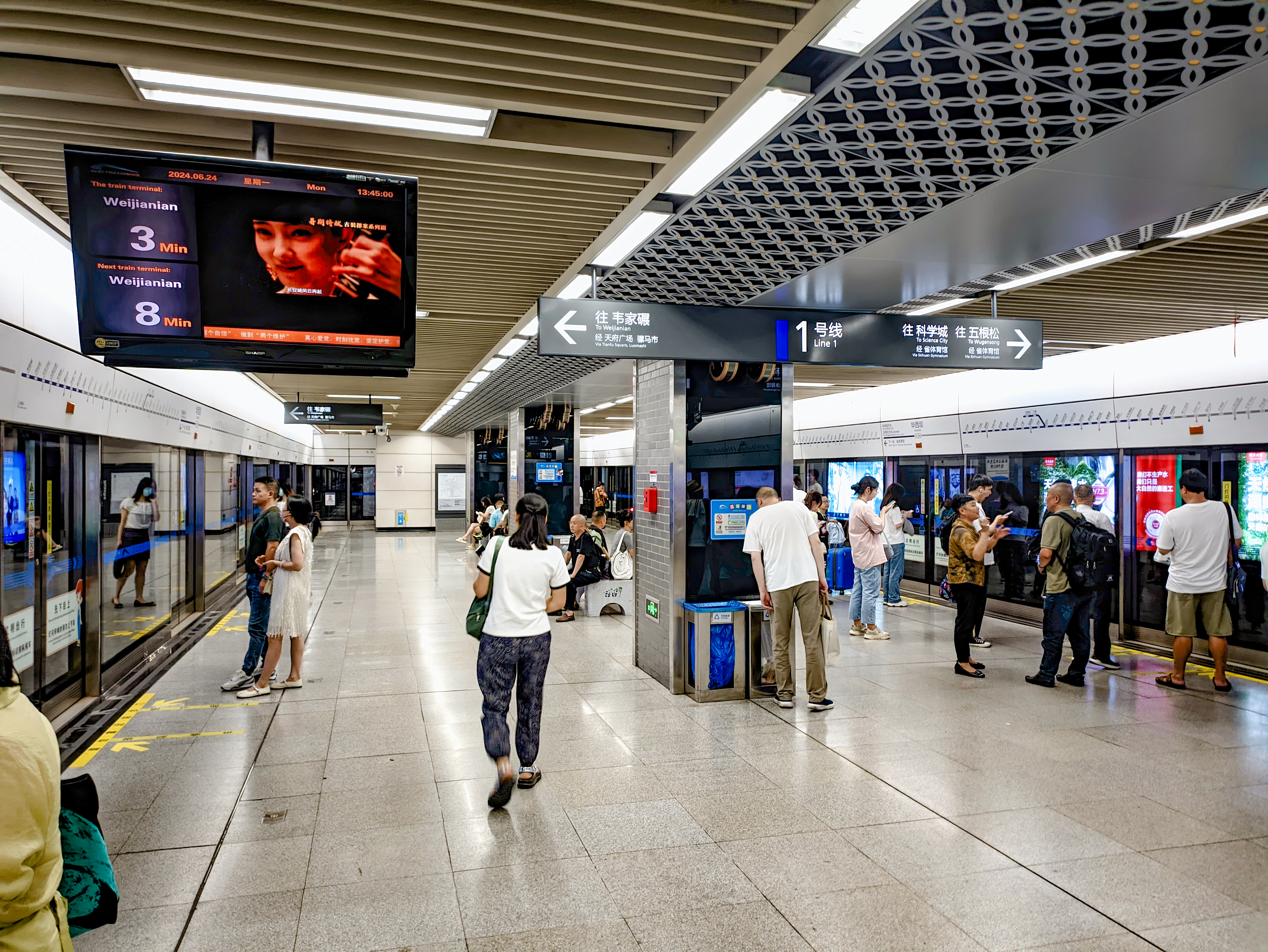
Line 1 Platform

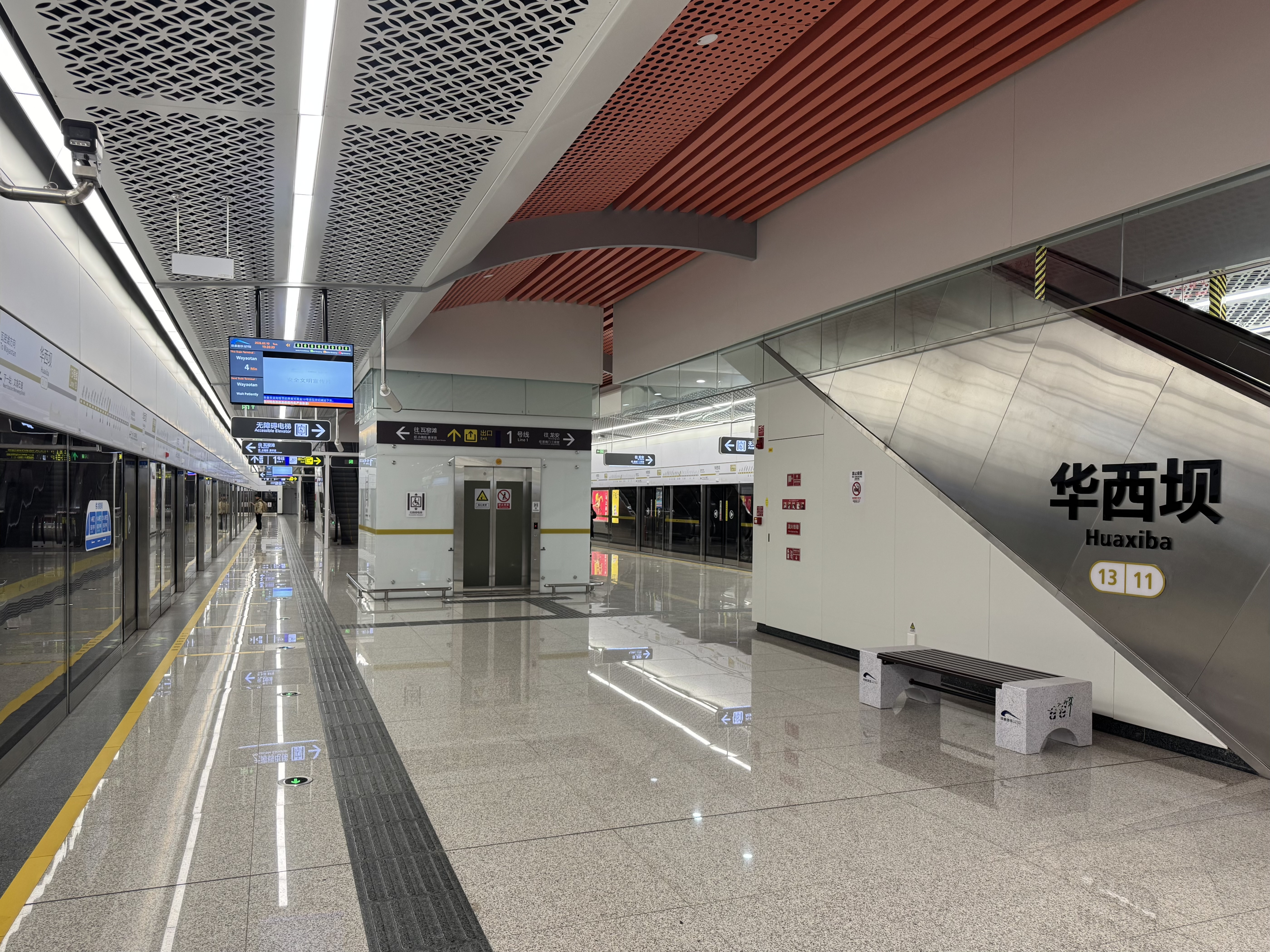
Line 13 Platform
