= Moziqiao station =

Metro station in Chengdu, China

Moziqiao 磨子桥
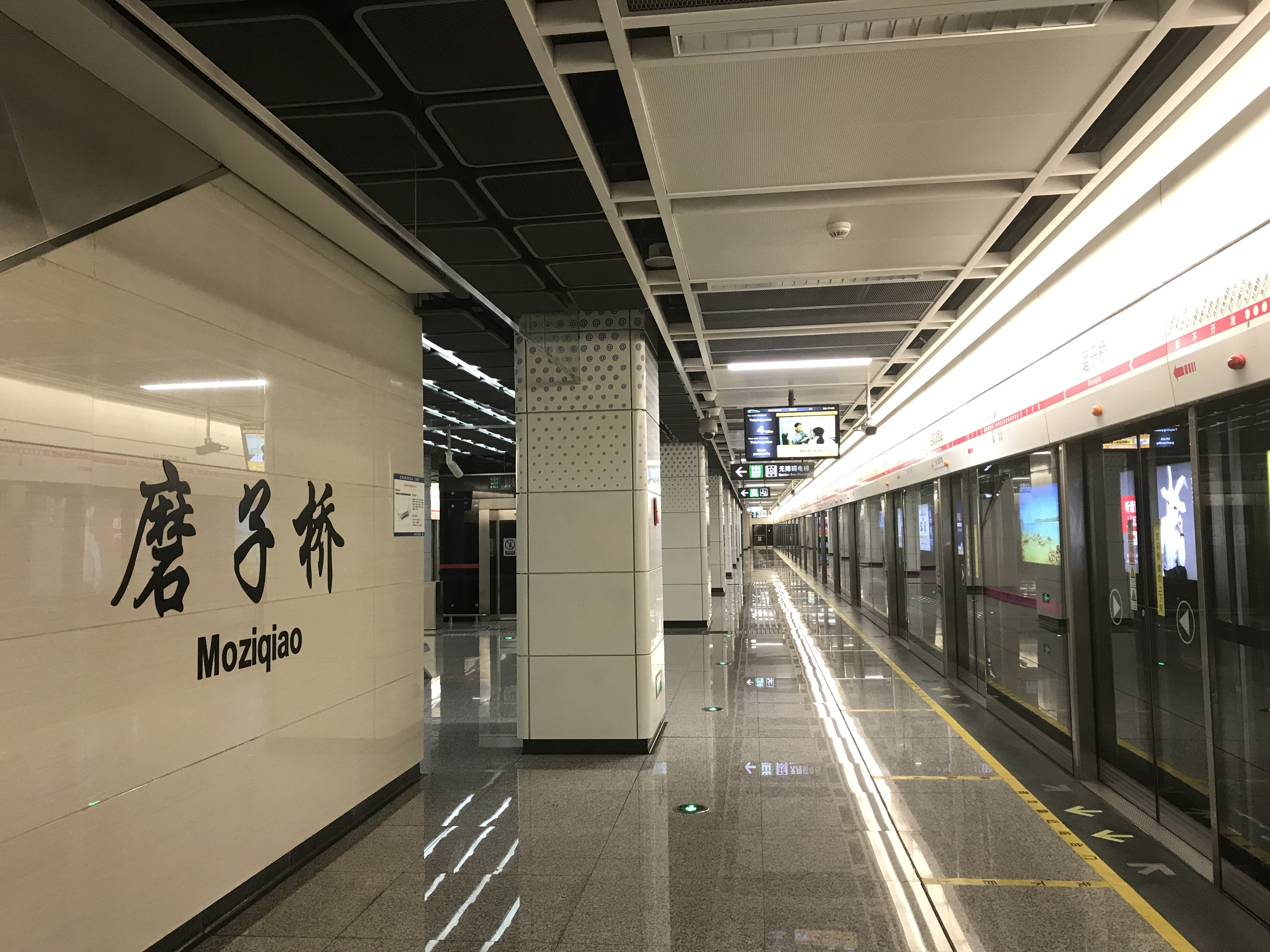

General information
- Location: Wuhou District, Chengdu, Sichuan; China
- Coordinates: 30.63996°N 104.07337°E
- Operated by: Chengdu Metro Limited
- Line(s): Line 3
- Platforms: 2 (1 island platform)

Other information
- Station code: 0321

History
- Opened: 31 July 2016

Services
Preceding station	Chengdu Metro	Following station
Xinnanmen towards Chengdu Medical College	Line 3	Sichuan Gymnasium towards Shuangliu West Railway Station

Moziqiao (Chinese: 磨子桥) is a station on Line 3 of the Chengdu Metro in China.

== Station layout ==
G	Entrances and Exits	Exits A-D
B1	Concourse	Faregates, Station Agent
B2	Northbound	← Line 3 towards Chengdu Medical College (Xinnanmen)
B2	Island platform, doors open on the left
B2	Southbound	Line 3 towards Shuangliu West Station (Sichuan Gymnasium) →

== Gallery ==
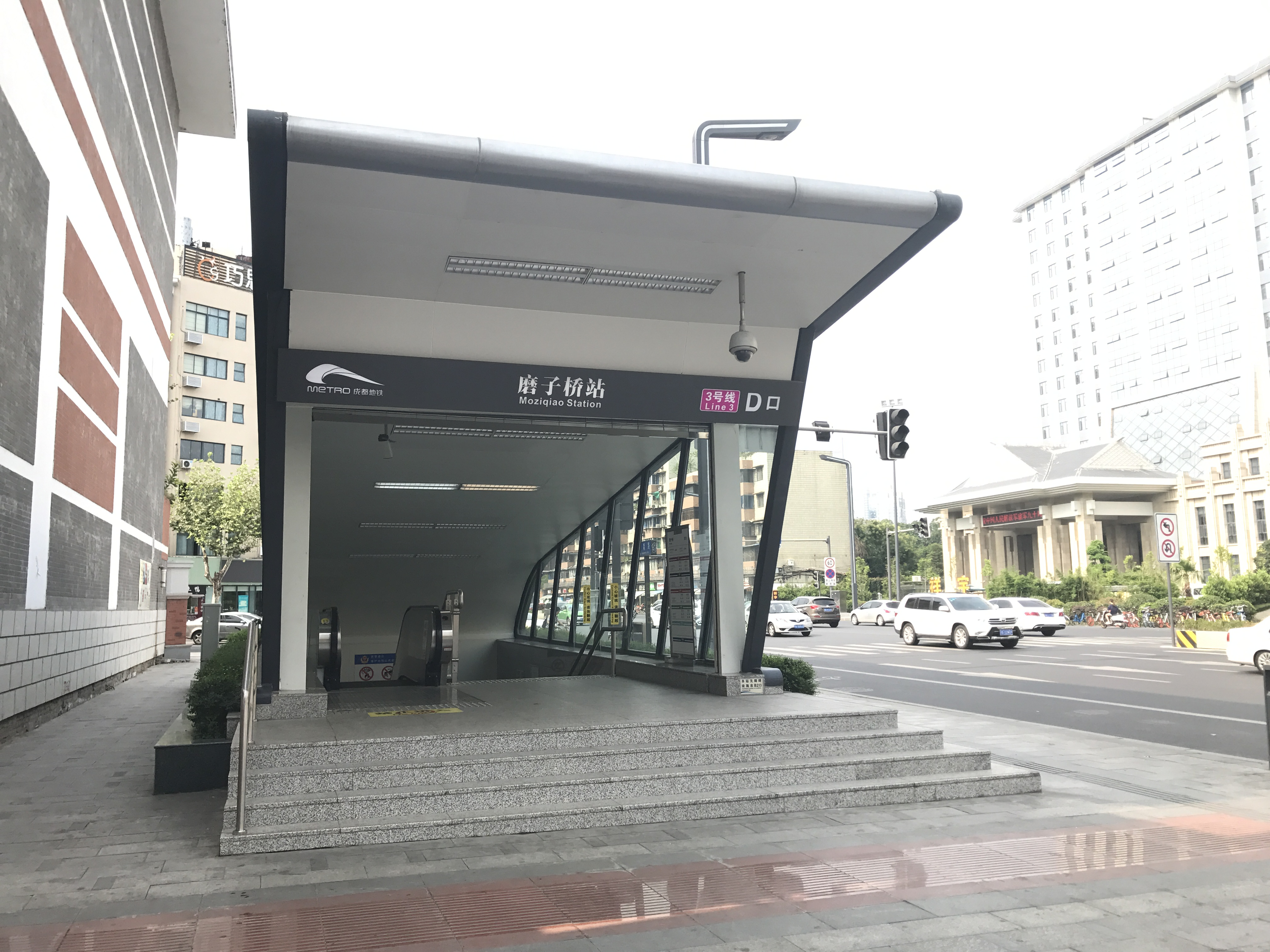
Entrance D

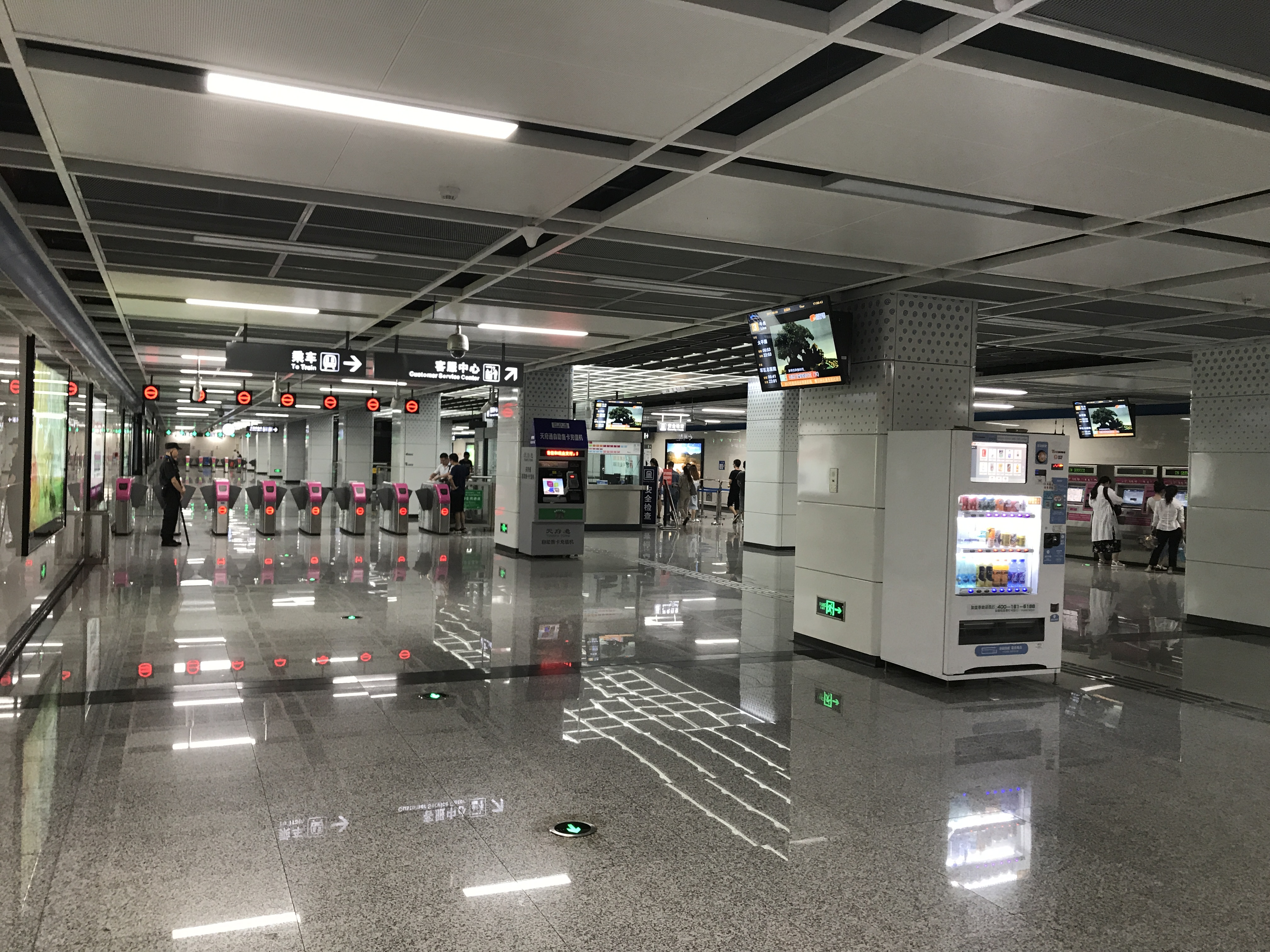
Concourse

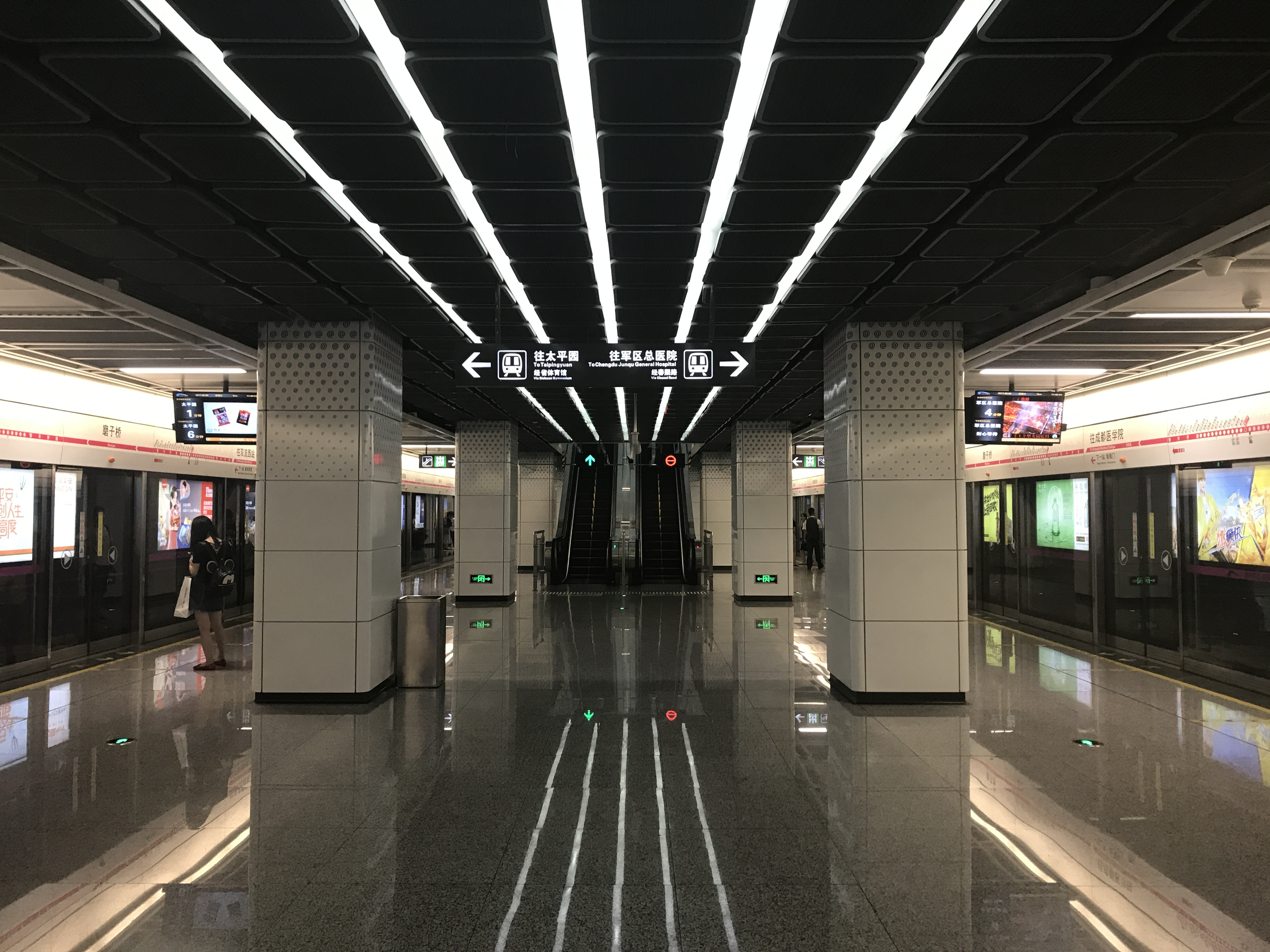
Platform
