= Jinjiang Hotel station =

Metro station in Chengdu, China

Jinjiang Hotel 锦江宾馆
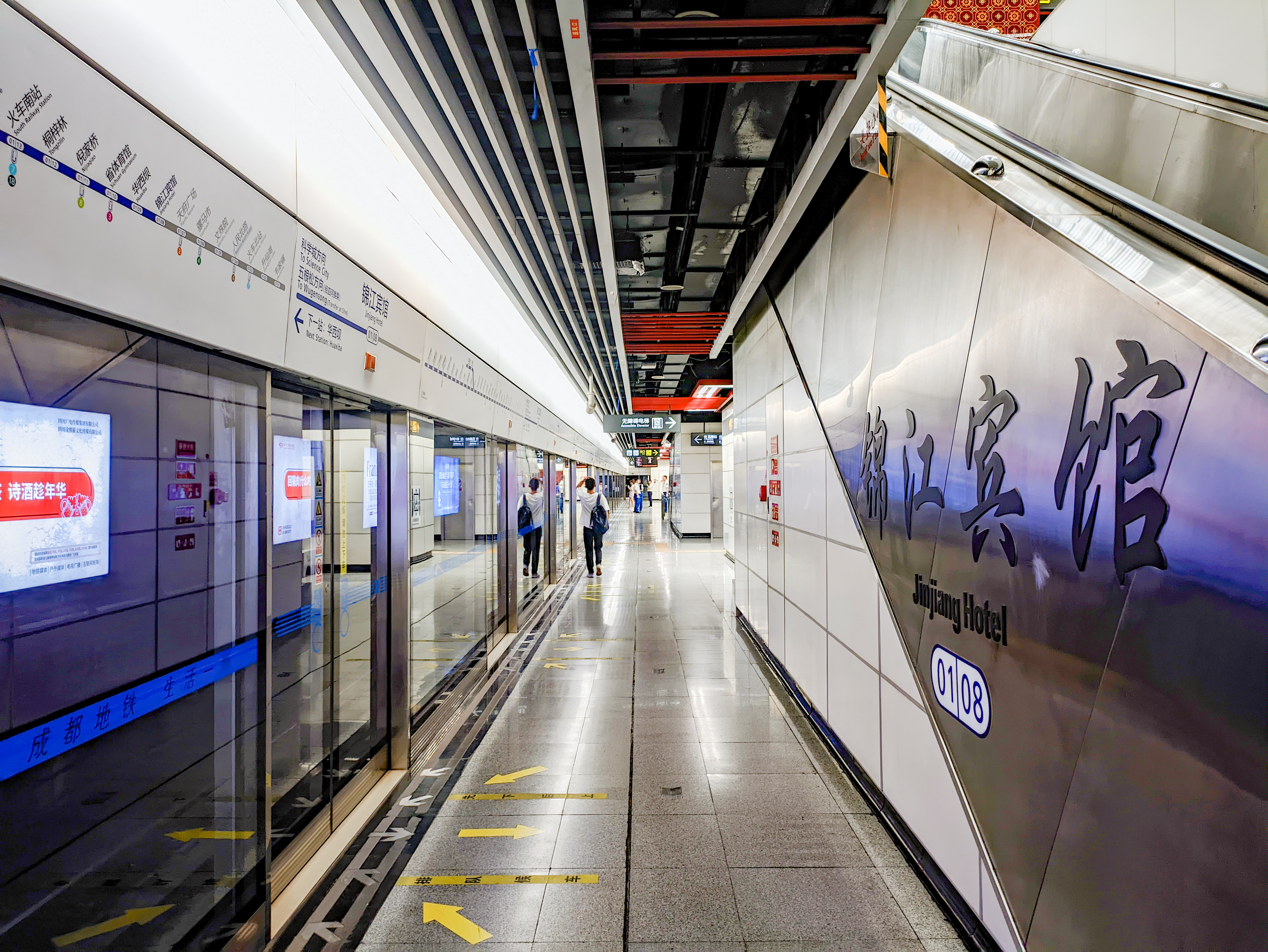

General information
- Location: Jinjiang, Chengdu, Sichuan; China
- Coordinates: 30.6524°N 104.0639°E
- Operator: Chengdu Metro Limited
- Line: Line 1
- Platforms: 2 (1 island platform)

Other information
- Station code: 0108

History
- Opened: 27 September 2010

Services
Preceding station	Chengdu Metro	Following station
Tianfu Square towards Weijianian	Line 1	Huaxiba towards Science City or Wugensong
Location

Jinjiang Hotel (锦江宾馆) is a metro station on Line 1 of the Chengdu Metro in China. The station is named after the Sichuan Jinjiang Hotel it serves.

== Station layout ==
G	Entrances and Exits	Exits A-C
B1	Concourse	Faregates, Station Agent
B2	Northbound	← Line 1 towards Weijianian (Tianfu Square)
B2	Island platform, doors open on the left
B2	Southbound	Line 1 towards Science City (Huaxiba) →

== Gallery ==
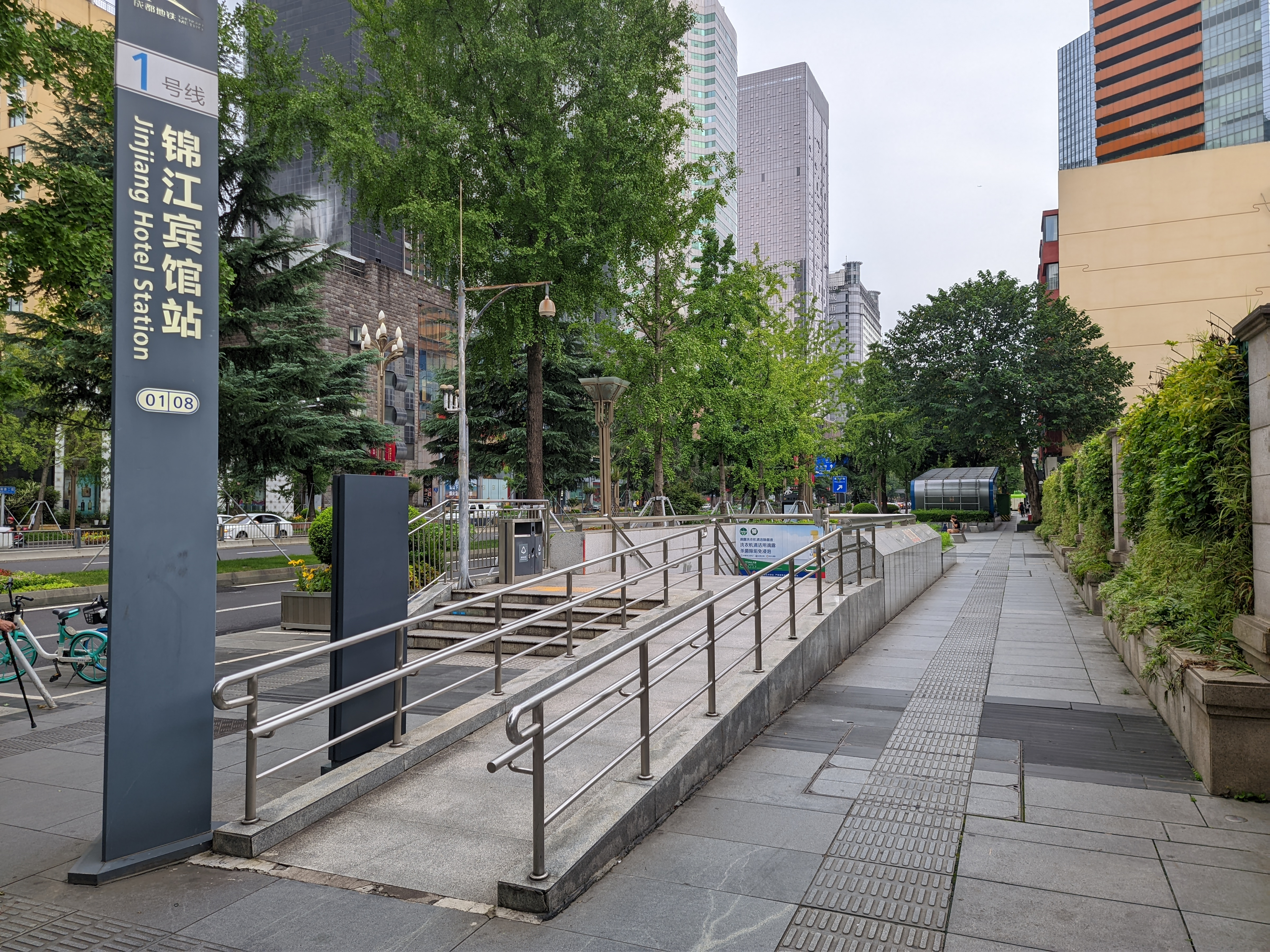
Entrance C1

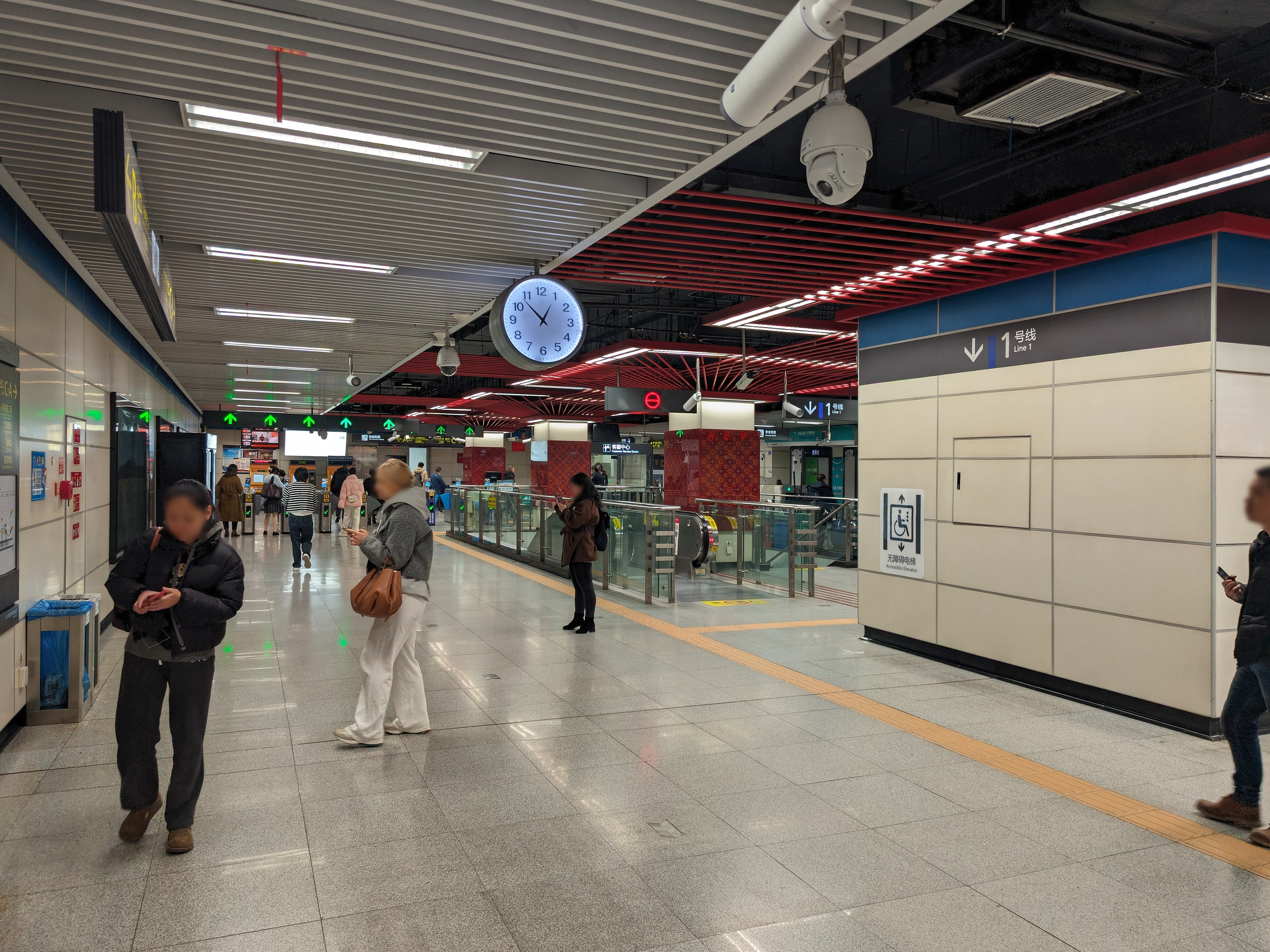
Concourse

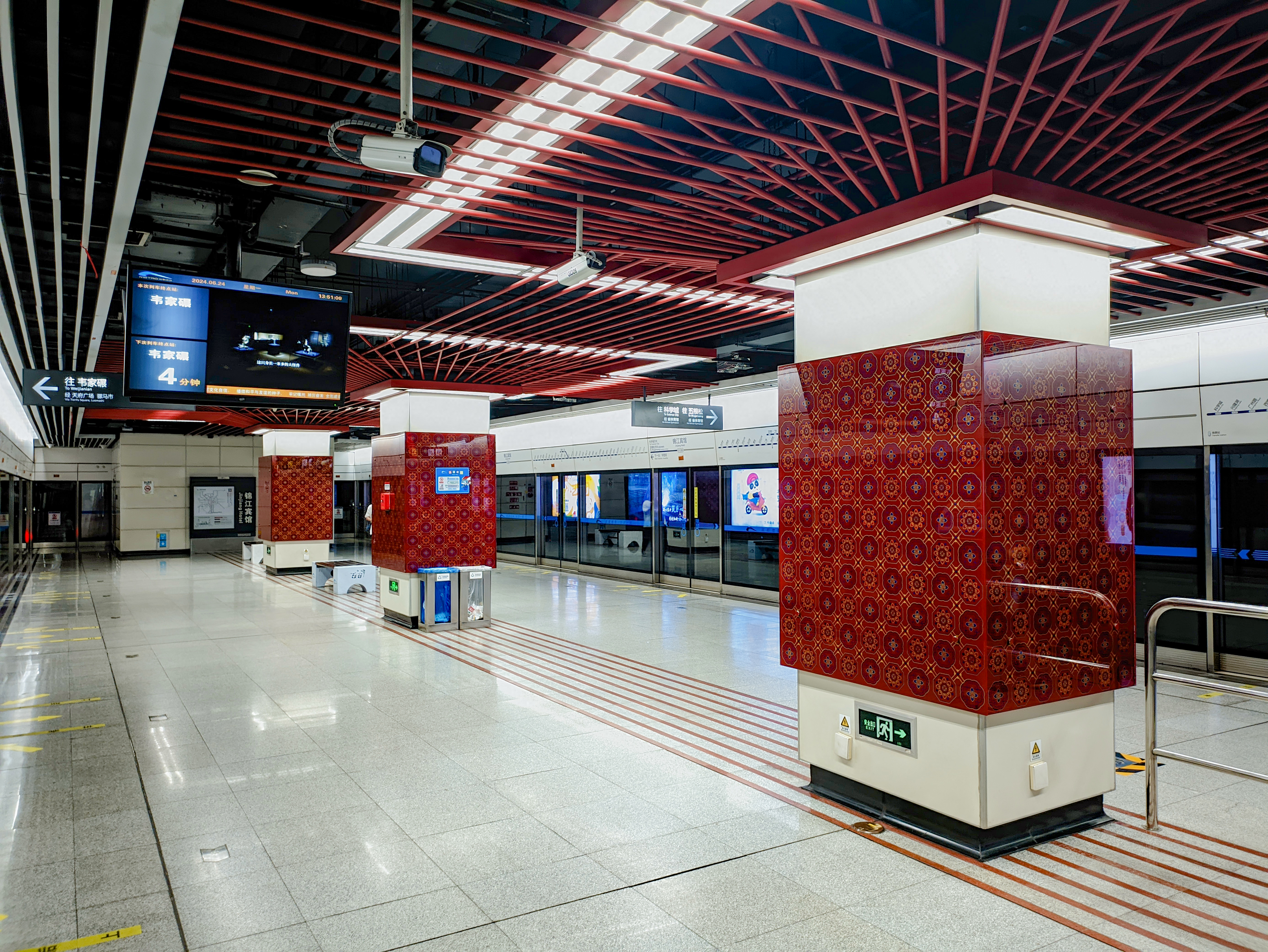
Platform
