= Sichuan Jinjiang Hotel =

Official reception hotel in Chengdu, Sichuan, China

Jinjiang Hotel
- 四川锦江宾馆

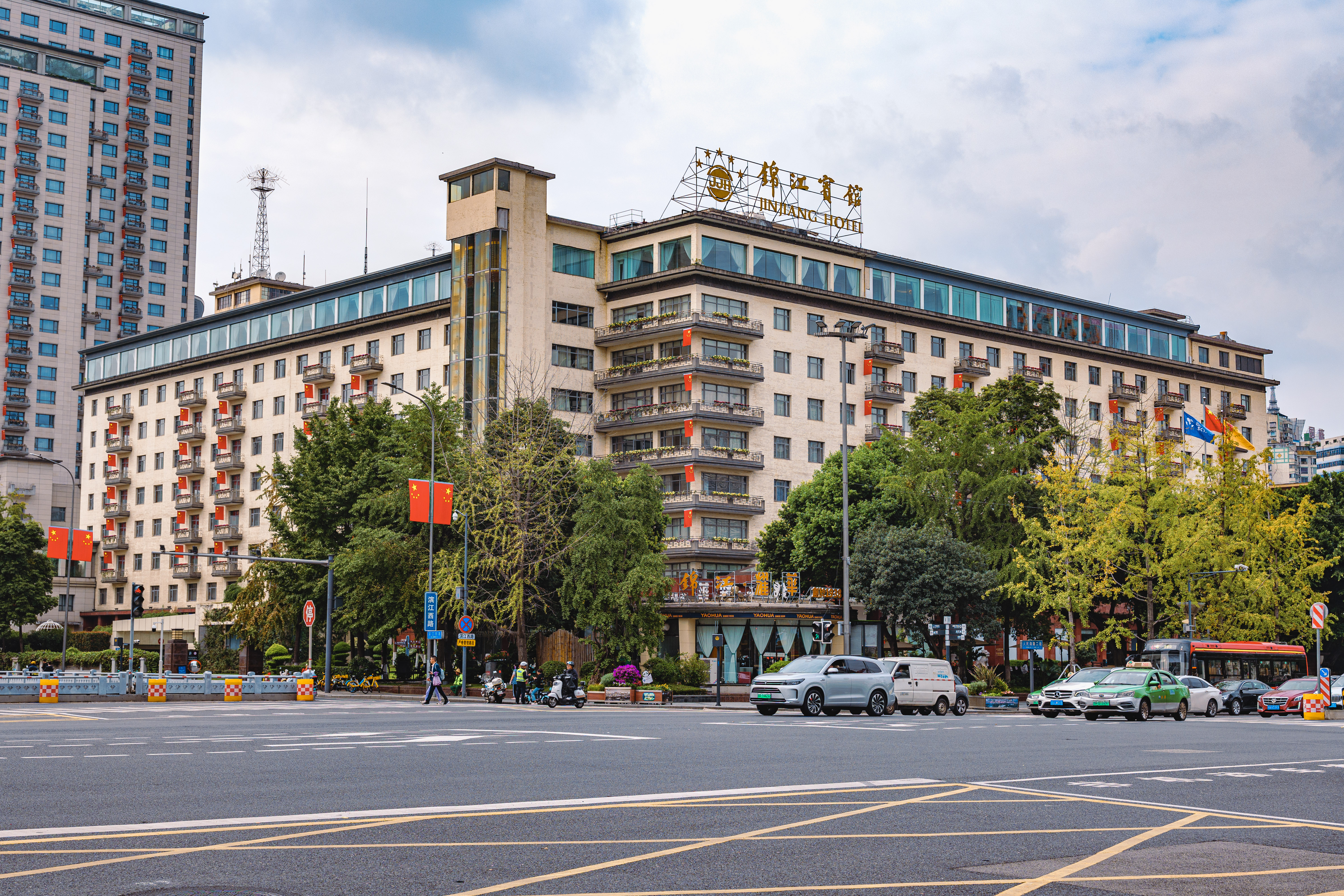
- Interactive map of the Jinjiang Hotel area
- Alternative names: Sichuan Jinjiang Hotel; Chengdu Jinjiang Hotel

General information
- Type: State guest house
- Classification: Five-star hotel
- Location: Chengdu, China
- Coordinates: 30.65057°N 104.062348°E
- Opened: 1960
- Owner: Sichuan Provincial People's Government

Other information
- Public transit: Metro Line 1 Jinjiang Hotel station

Website
- www.jjhotel.com

Sichuan Jinjiang Hotel (四川锦江宾馆) is a state guest house and official reception hotel in Chengdu, Sichuan, China. The hotel was established by the Sichuan Provincial People's Government in 1958, and named by Chinese top generals Zhu De and Chen Yi. The hotel is located near the geographical center of the City of Chengdu and right adjacent to the Sichuan Provincial Congress. It serves as the official residence for visiting domestic and foreign dignitaries to Sichuan and Western China. The hotel is served by the Jinjiang Hotel metro station of the Chengdu Metro.

== History ==
In 1960, Jinjiang Hotel was opened.

In 1979, Jinjiang Hotel became the first foreign-related tourist hotel in Sichuan Province and implemented corporate management.

In 1989, Jinjiang Hotel was rated as a three-star hotel.

In 1992, Jinjiang Hotel was promoted to a four-star hotel.

In 1995, Jinjiang Hotel was awarded five stars (the highest), becoming the first five-star business and tourist hotel in Western China.

In 2007, Jinjiang Hotel won the title of "Best Business Tourism Hotel" by the China National Tourism Administration.

In November 2008, Jinjiang Hotel was placed under Sichuan Development (Holdings) Co., Ltd. and became its wholly owned subsidiary.

In August 2011, at the invitation of Xi Jinping, Joe Biden paid a state visit to China. Xi Jinping hosted a state banquet for Biden at Jinjiang Hotel in Chengdu. In addition, successive party and state leaders such as Wu Bangguo, Wen Jiabao, Wang Qishan, Li Lanqing, He Guoqiang have all stayed at Jinjiang Hotel.

In 2016, the hotel was listed on the first issue of "China's 20th Century Architectural Heritage List", along with the Great Hall of the People in Beijing, the Cultural Palace of Nationalities in Beijing, and The Bund Building Clusters in Shanghai.

In 2018, Jinjiang Hotel won the Best Urban Business Hotel Award from the China Tourist Hotels Association.
