= Jinshuihe station =

Metro station in Chengdu, China

Jinshuihe 锦水河
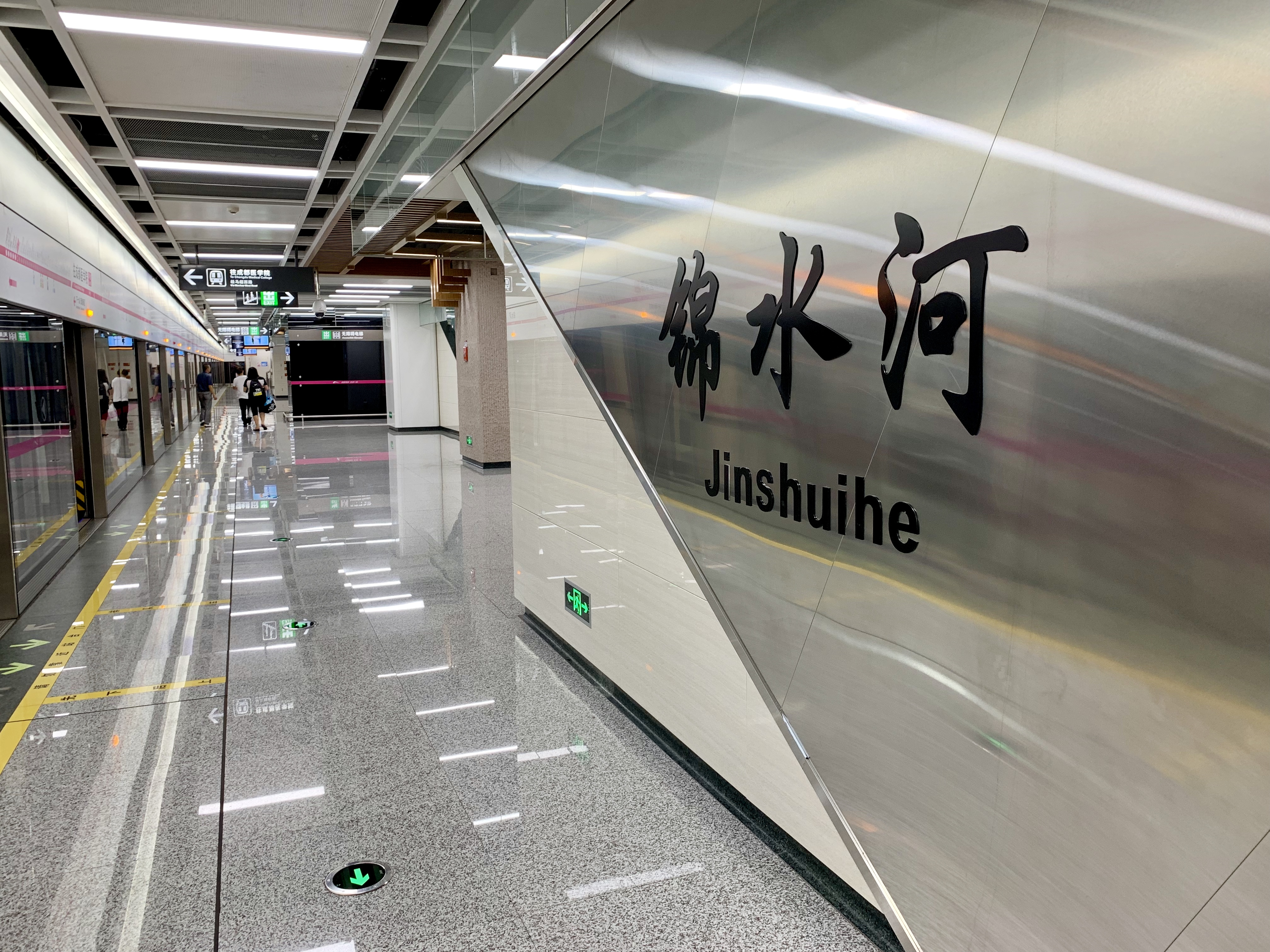

General information
- Location: Xindu District, Chengdu, Sichuan; China
- Coordinates: 30.7996209°N 104.1511586°E
- Operated by: Chengdu Metro Limited
- Line: Line 3
- Platforms: 2 (1 island platform)

Other information
- Station code: 0306

History
- Opened: 26 December 2018

Services
Preceding station	Chengdu Metro	Following station
Tuanjiexinqu towards Chengdu Medical College	Line 3	Sanhechang towards Shuangliu West Railway Station
Location

Jinshuihe (Chinese: 锦水河) is a station on Line 3 of the Chengdu Metro in China.

== Station layout ==
G	Entrances and Exits	Exits A, B, G
B1	Concourse	Faregates, Station Agent
B2	Northbound	← Line 3 towards Chengdu Medical College (Tuanjiexinqu)
B2	Island platform, doors open on the left
B2	Southbound	Line 3 towards Shuangliu West Station (Sanhechang) →

== Gallery ==
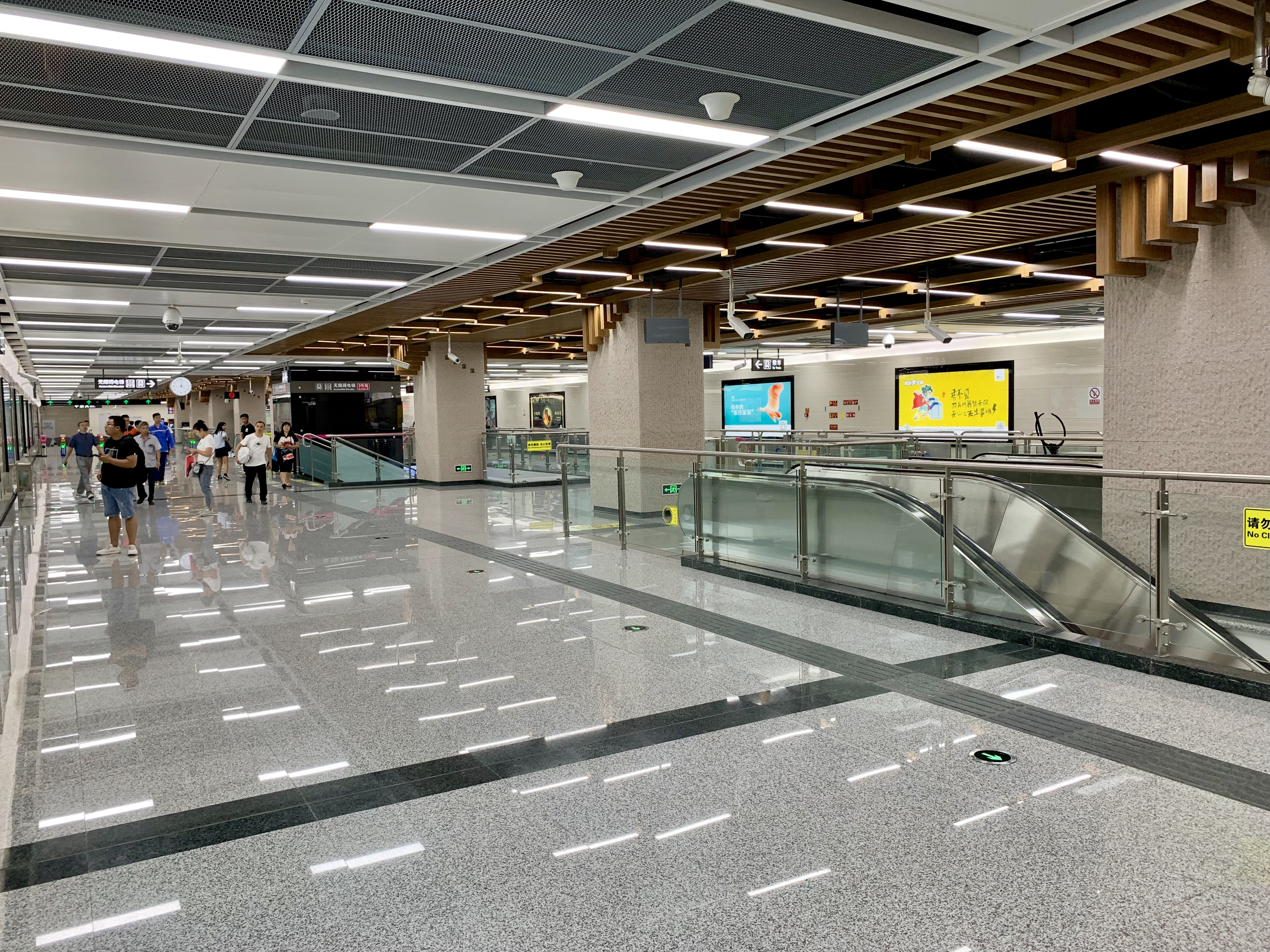
Concourse

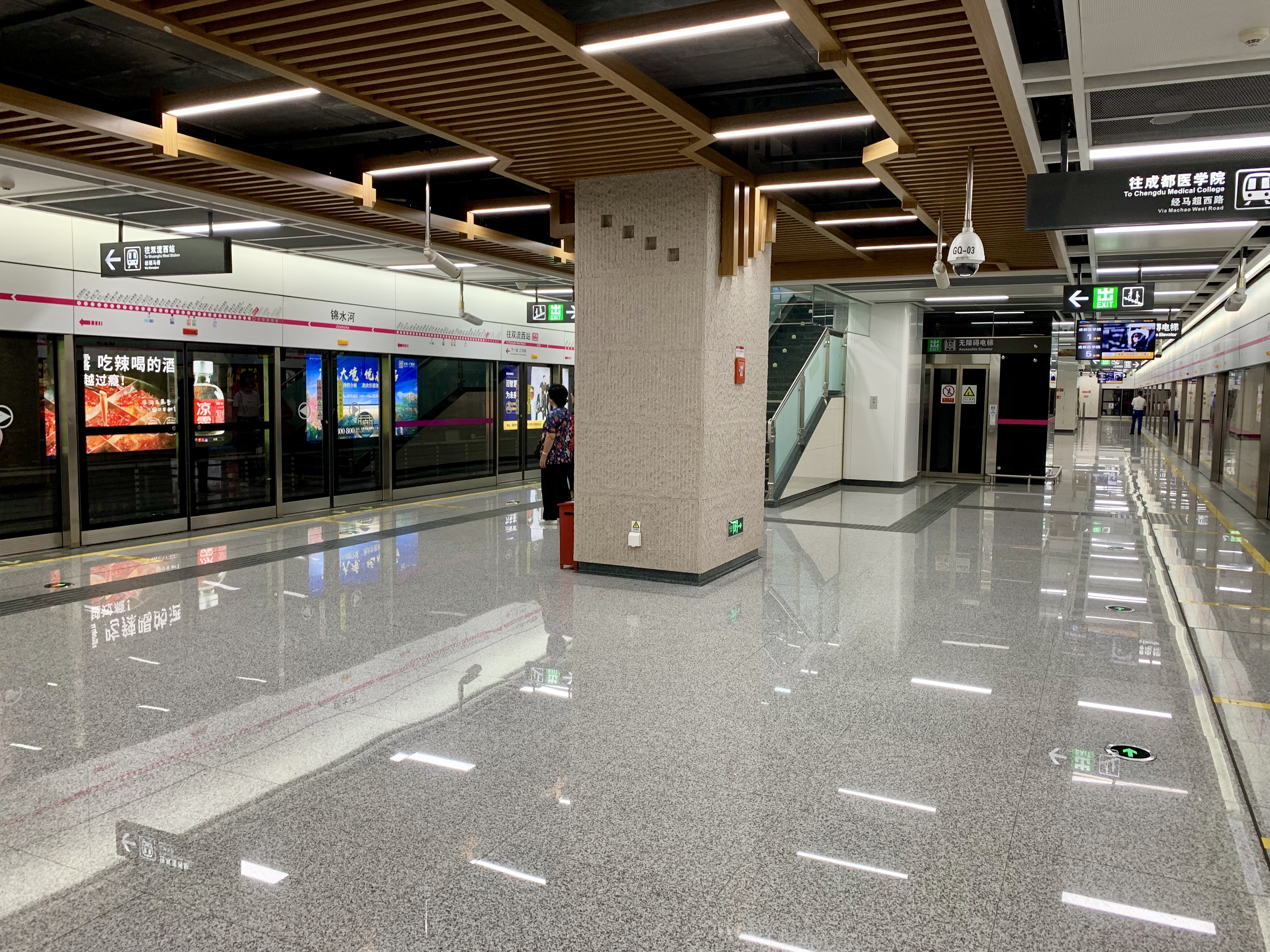
Platform
