= Clock Tower station =

Metro station in Chengdu, China

Clock Tower 钟楼
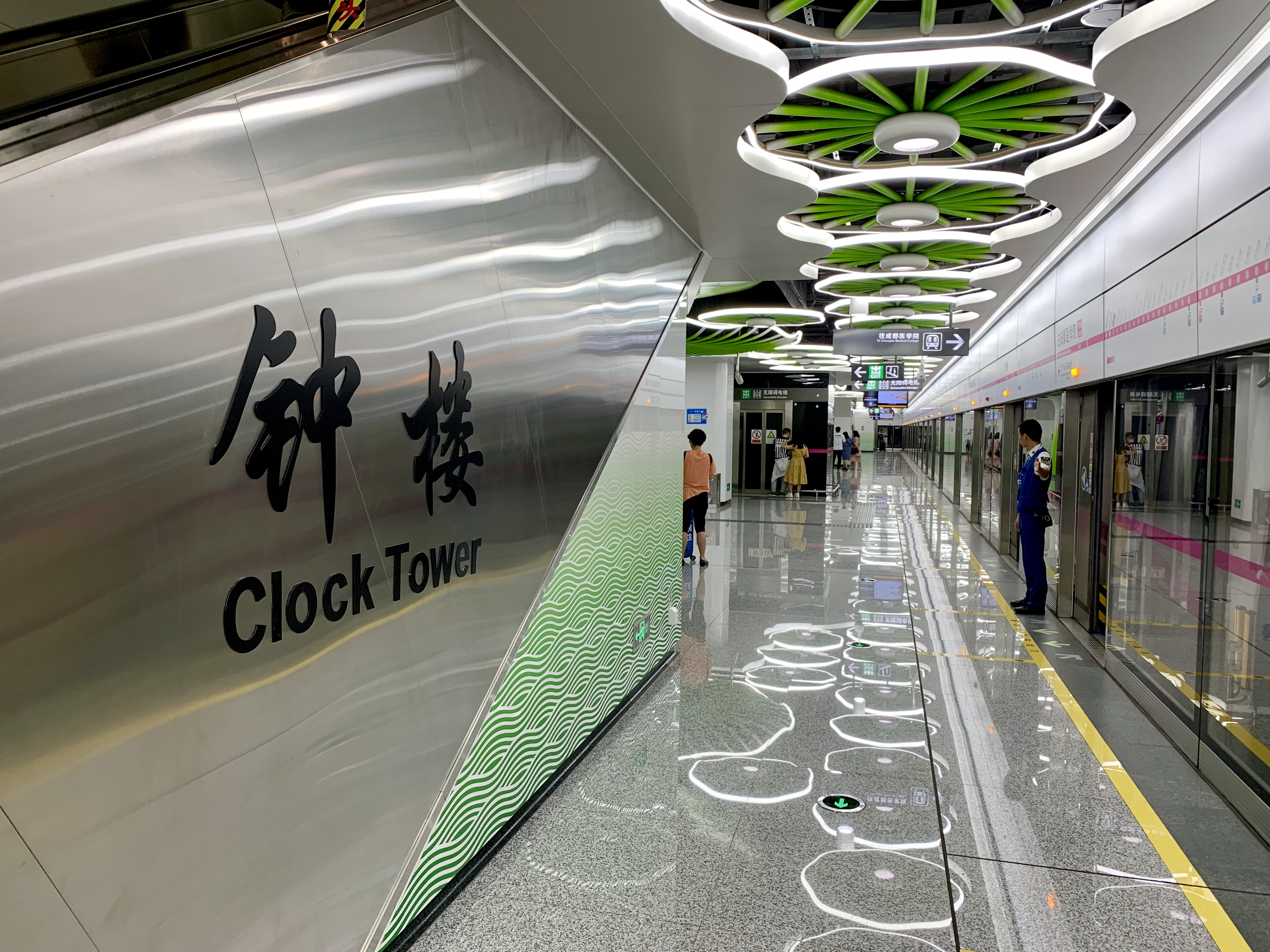

General information
- Location: Xindu District, Chengdu, Sichuan; China
- Coordinates: 30.8230747°N 104.1724055°E
- Operated by: Chengdu Metro Limited
- Line: Line 3
- Platforms: 2 (1 island platform)

Other information
- Station code: 0303

History
- Opened: 26 December 2018

Services
Preceding station	Chengdu Metro	Following station
Southwest Petroleum University towards Chengdu Medical College	Line 3	Machao West Road towards Shuangliu West Railway Station
Location

Clock Tower (Chinese: 钟楼) is a station on Line 3 of the Chengdu Metro in China.

== Station layout ==
G	Entrances and Exits	Exits A-D
B1	Concourse	Faregates, Station Agent
B2	Northbound	← Line 3 towards Chengdu Medical College (Southwest Petroleum University)
B2	Island platform, doors open on the left
B2	Southbound	Line 3 towards Shuangliu West Station (Machao West Road) →

== Gallery ==
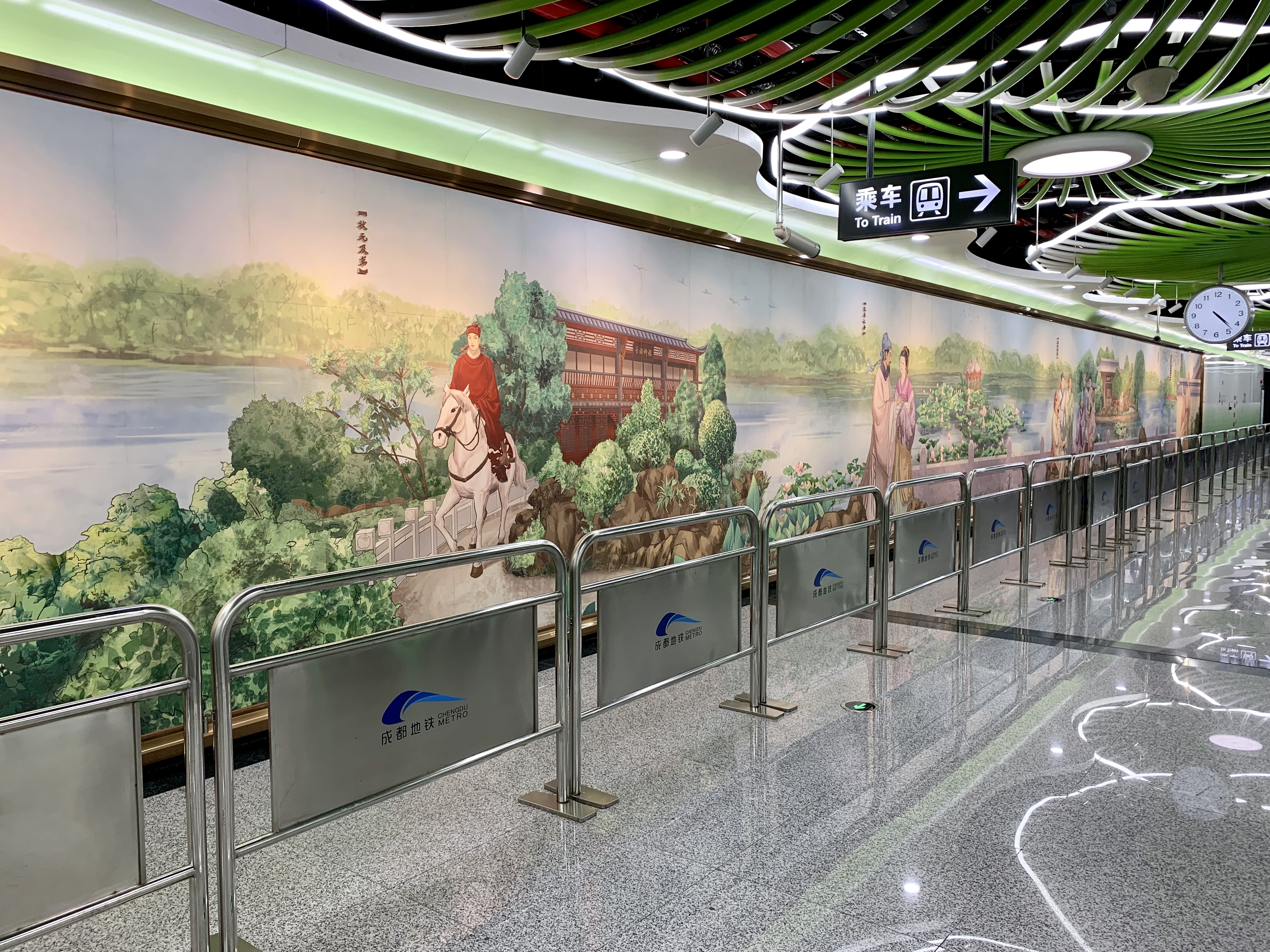
Artwork

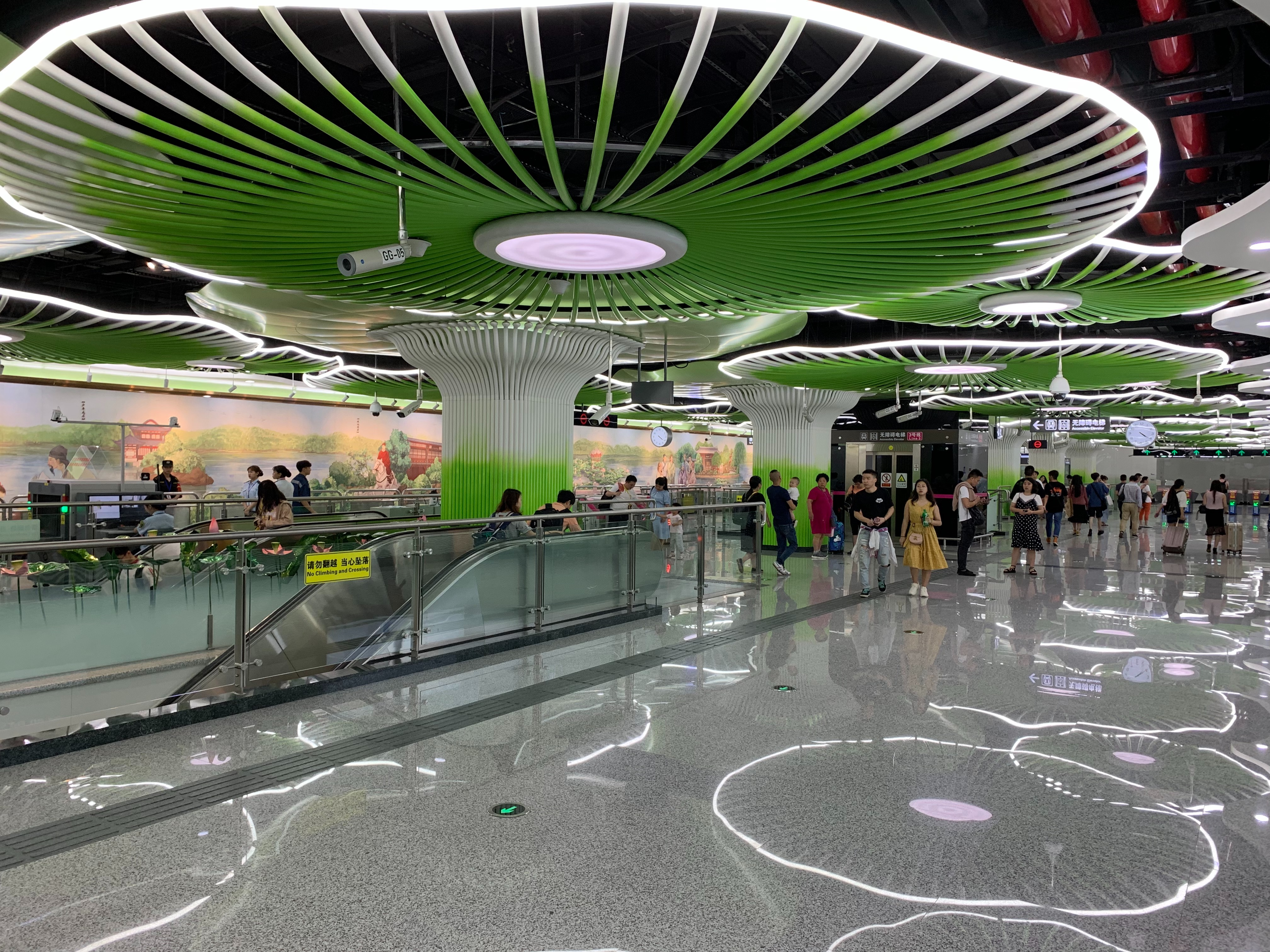
Concourse

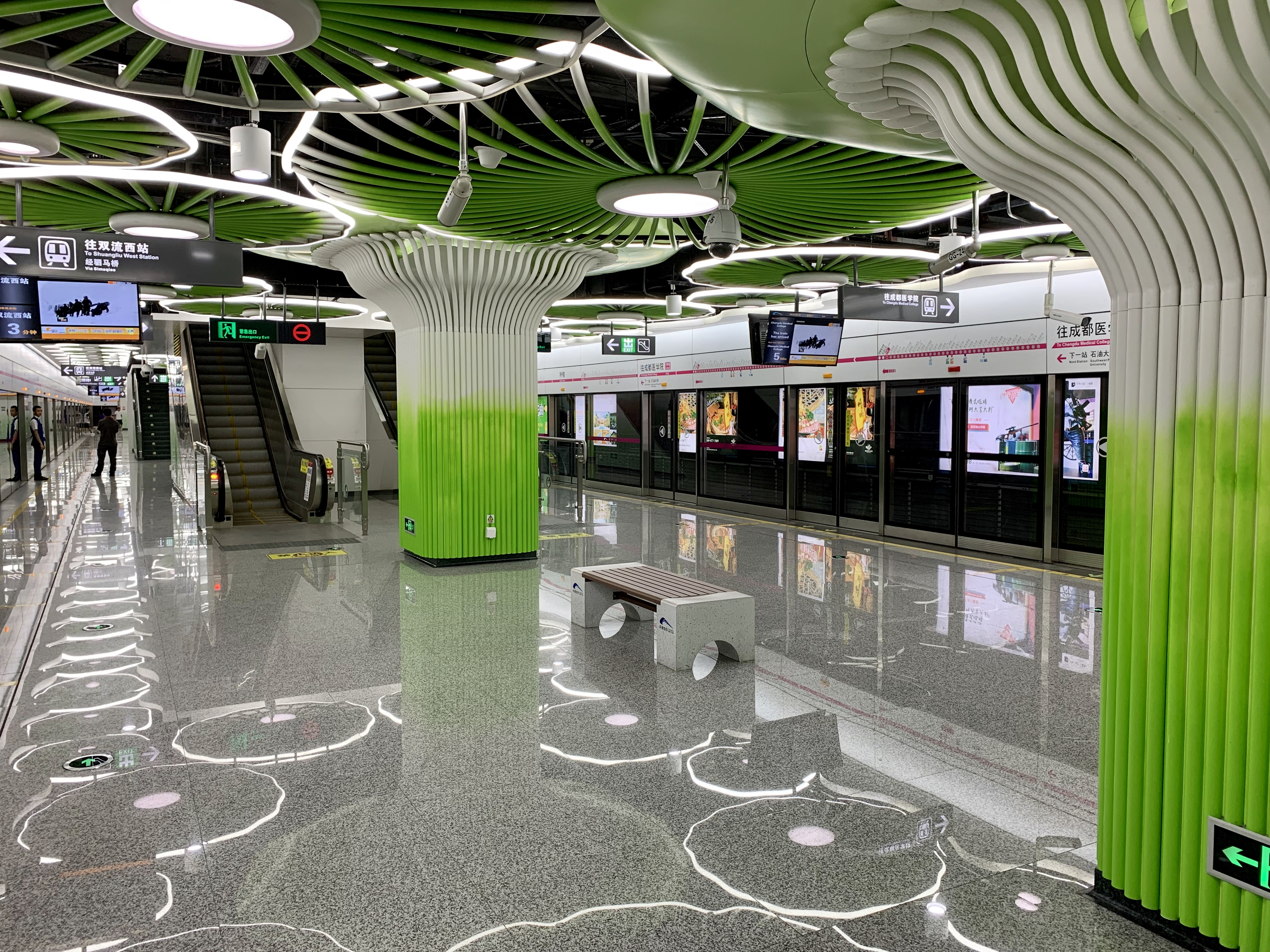
Platform
