= Botanical Garden station (Chengdu Metro) =

Metro station in Chengdu, China

Botanical Garden 植物园
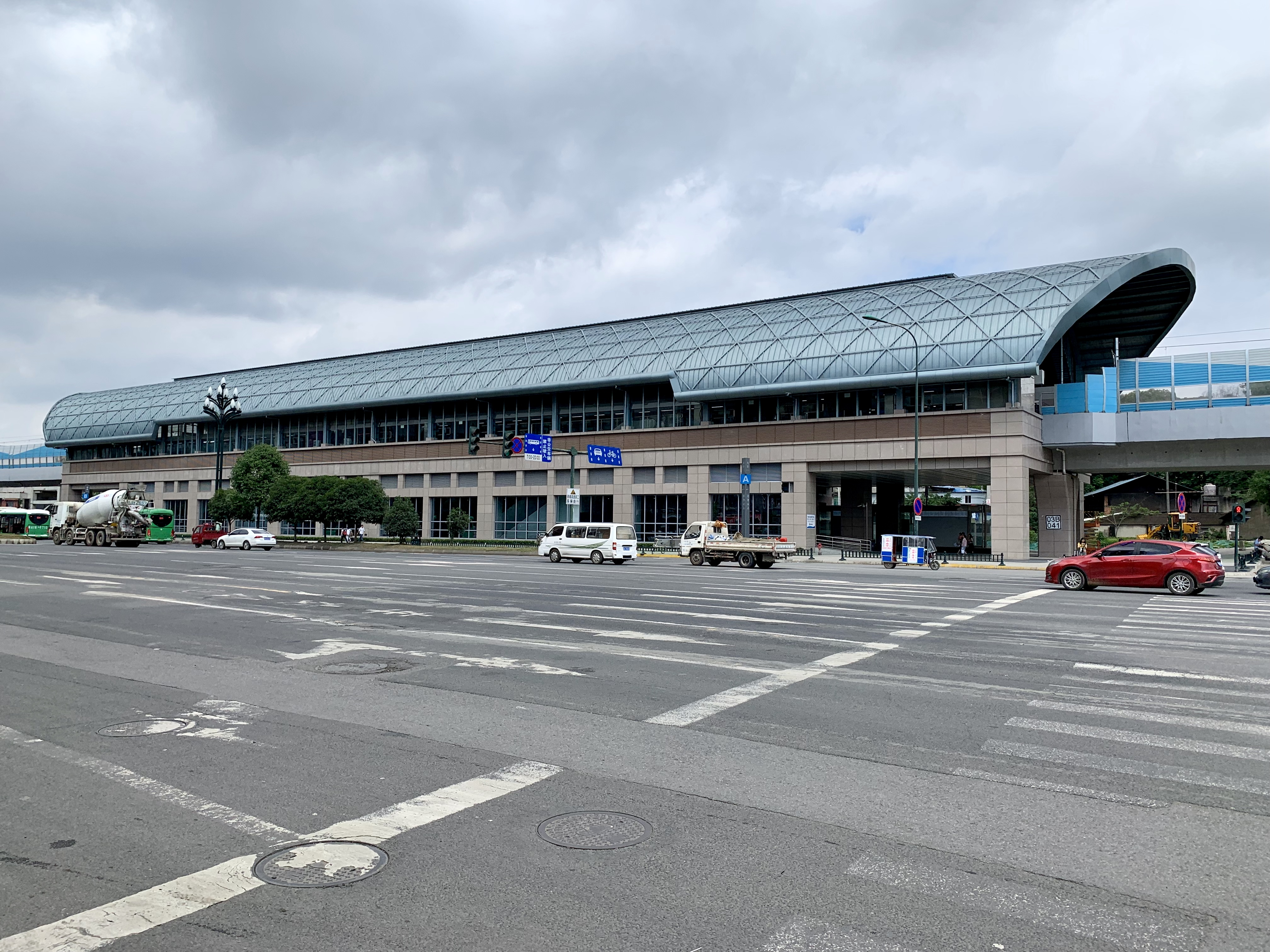

General information
- Location: Jinniu District, Chengdu, Sichuan; China
- Coordinates: 30.7657°N 104.1189°E
- Operated by: Chengdu Metro Limited
- Line(s): Line 3
- Platforms: 2 (2 side platforms)

Other information
- Station code: 0309

History
- Opened: 26 December 2018

Services
Preceding station	Chengdu Metro	Following station
Jinhuasi East Road towards Chengdu Medical College	Line 3	Chengdu Junqu General Hospital towards Shuangliu West Railway Station

Botanical Garden (Chinese: 植物园) is a station on Line 3 of the Chengdu Metro in China.

== Station layout ==
2F	Side platform, doors open on the right
2F	Northbound	← Line 3 towards Chengdu Medical College (Jinhuasi East Road)
2F	Southbound	Line 3 towards Shuangliu West Railway Station (Chengdu Junqu General Hospital) →
2F	Side platform, doors open on the right
G	Entrances and Exits	Exits A, B, Faregates, Station Agent

== Gallery ==
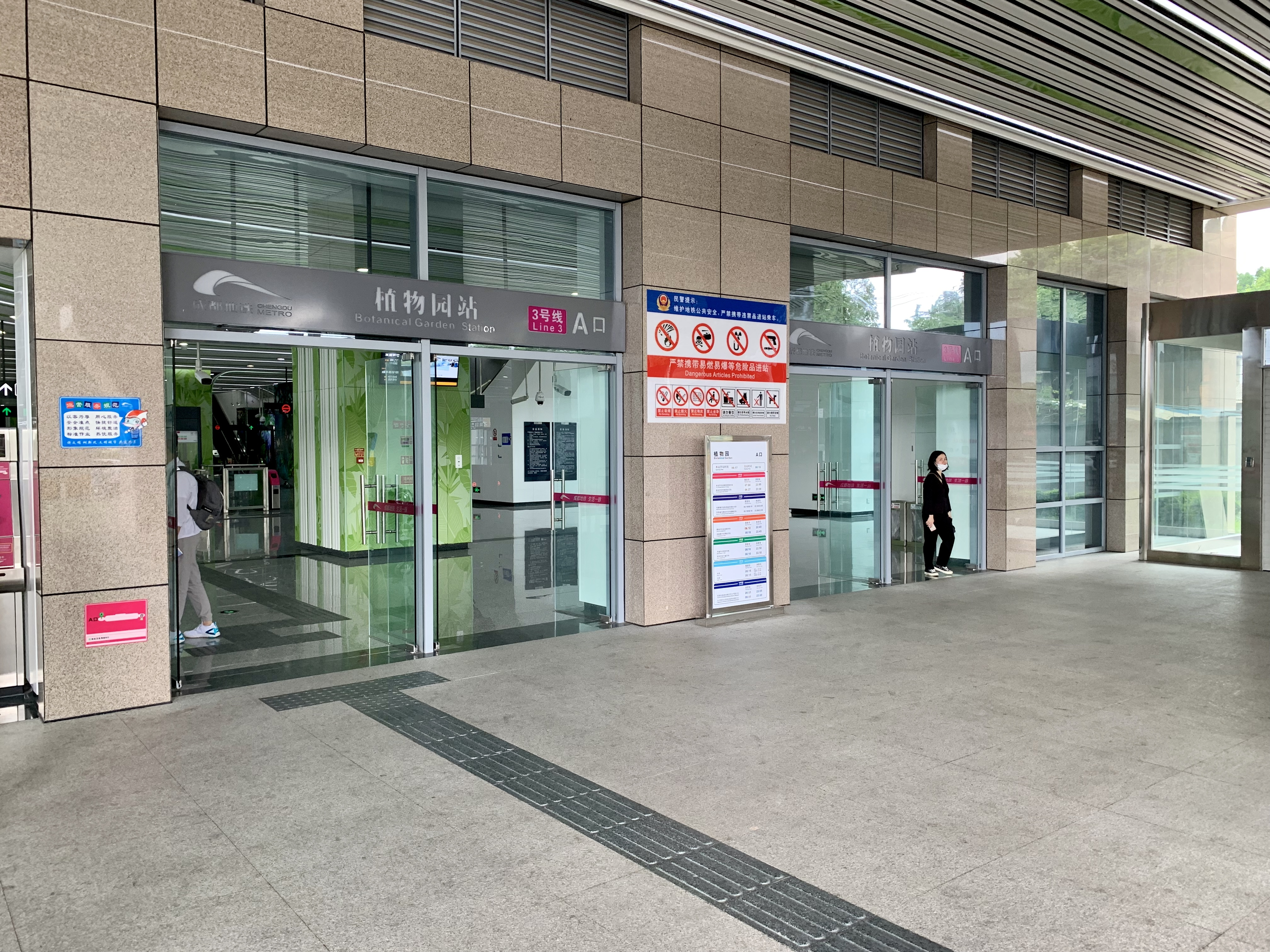
Entrance A

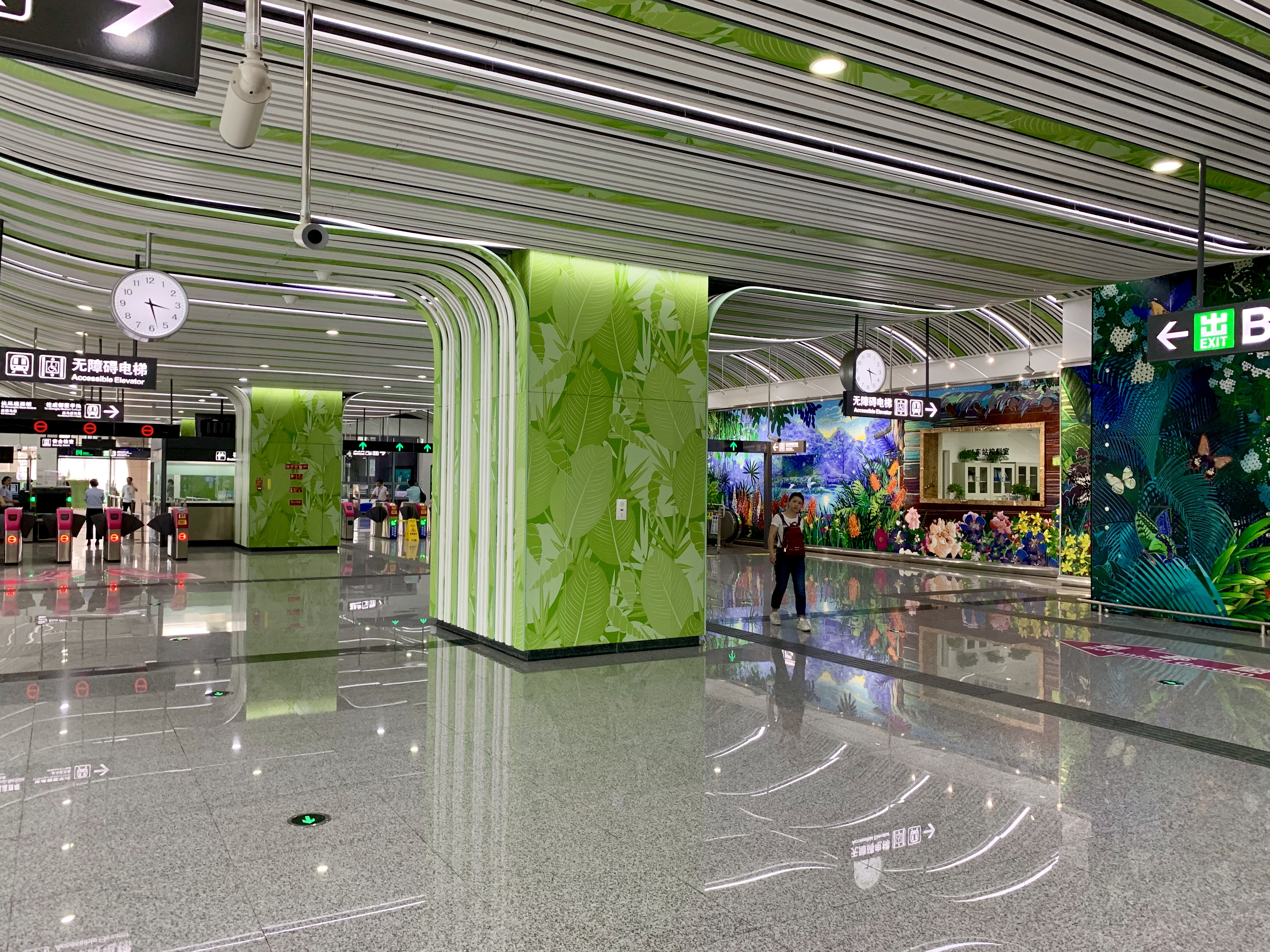
Concourse

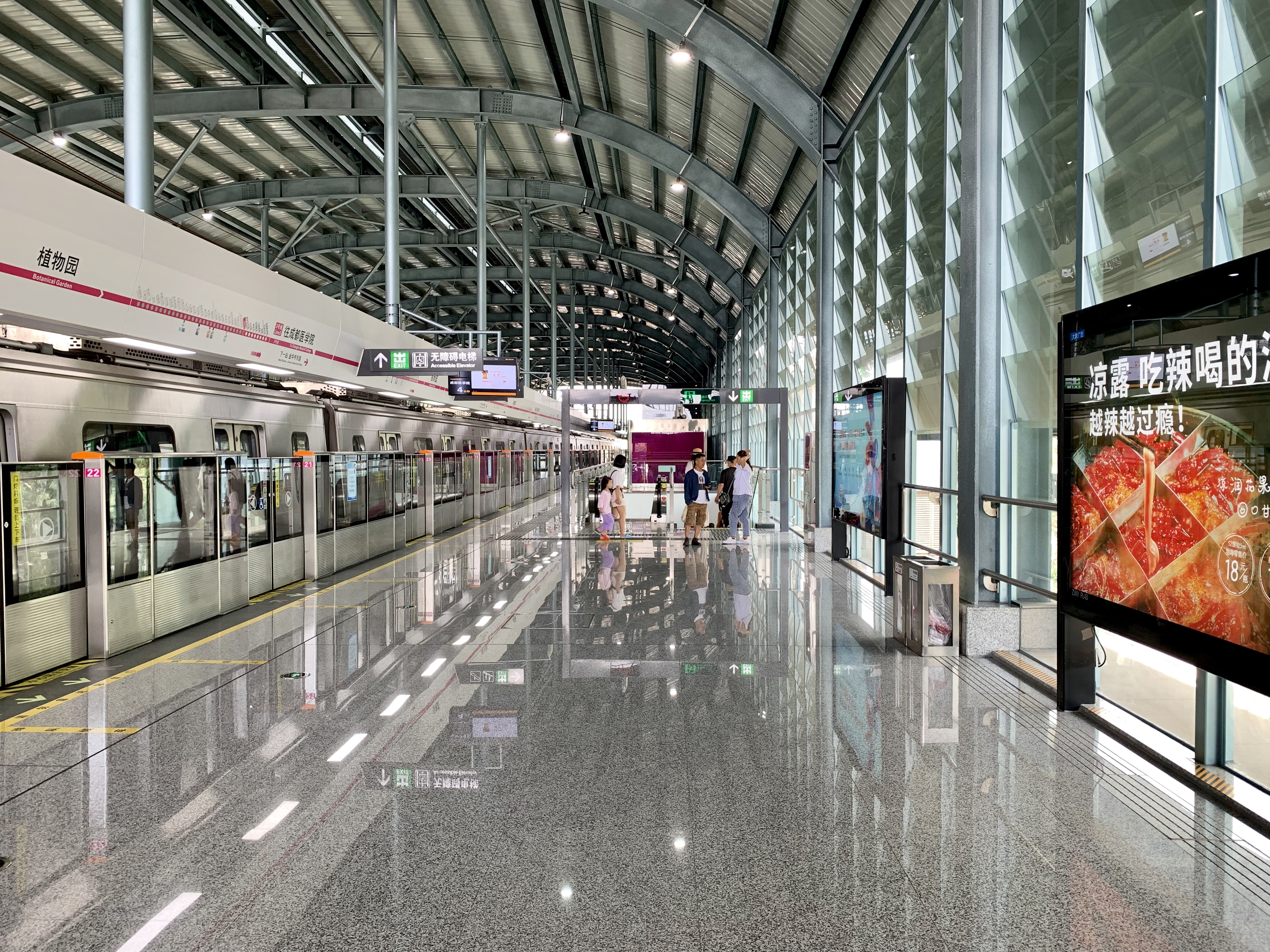
Platform
