= Sanhechang station =

Metro station in Chengdu, China

Sanhechang 三河场
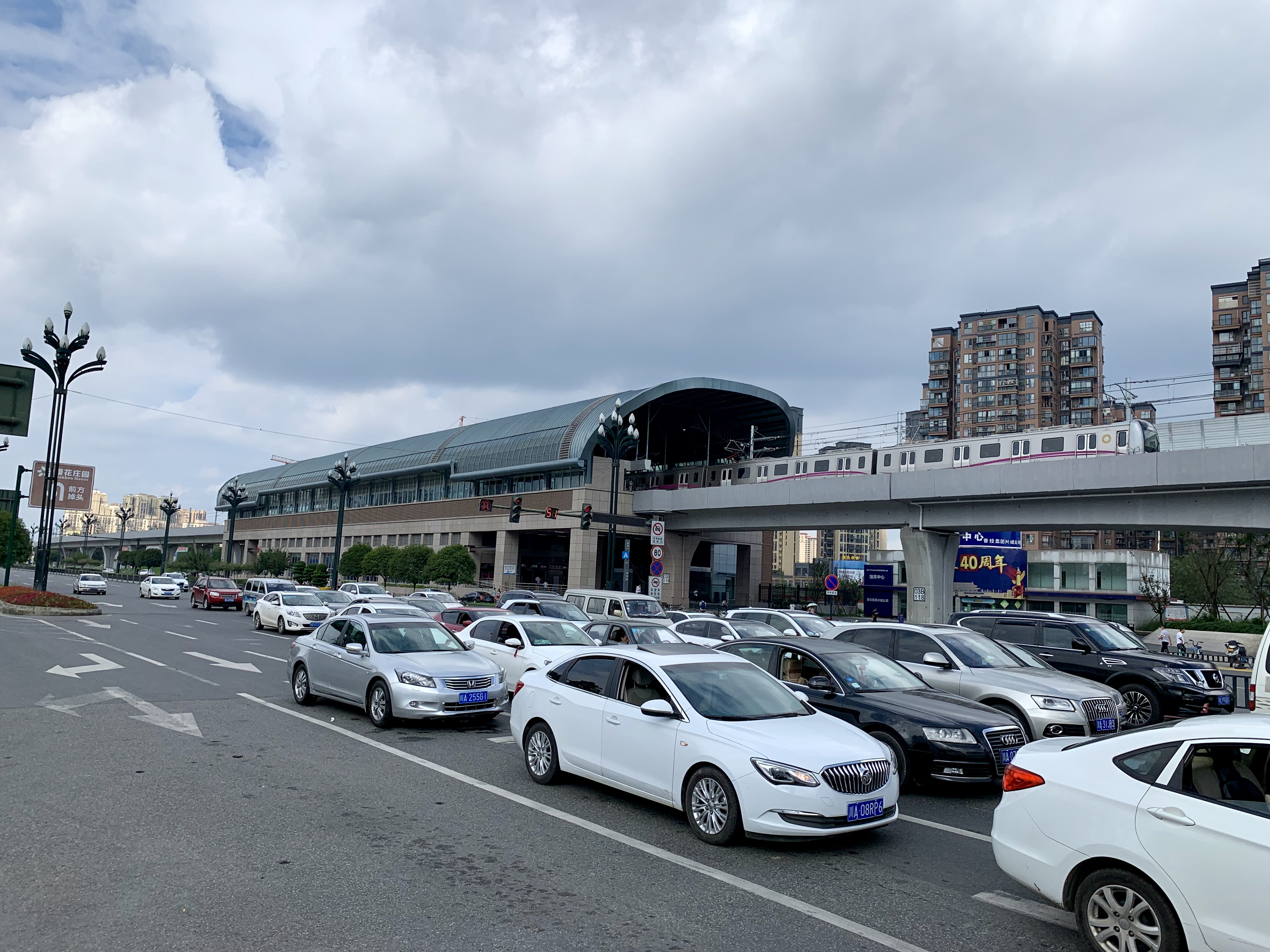

General information
- Location: Xindu District, Chengdu, Sichuan; China
- Coordinates: 30.78708°N 104.13656°E
- Operated by: Chengdu Metro Limited
- Line(s): Line 3
- Platforms: 2 (2 side platforms)

Other information
- Station code: 0307

History
- Opened: 26 December 2018

Services
Preceding station	Chengdu Metro	Following station
Jinshuihe towards Chengdu Medical College	Line 3	Jinhuasi East Road towards Shuangliu West Railway Station
Location

Sanhechang (Chinese: 三河场) is a station on Line 3 of the Chengdu Metro in China.

== Station layout ==
2F	Side platform, doors open on the right
2F	Northbound	← Line 3 towards Chengdu Medical College (Jinshuihe)
2F	Southbound	Line 3 towards Shuangliu West Railway Station (Jinhuasi East Road) →
2F	Side platform, doors open on the right
G	Entrances and Exits	Exits A, B, Faregates, Station Agent

== Gallery ==
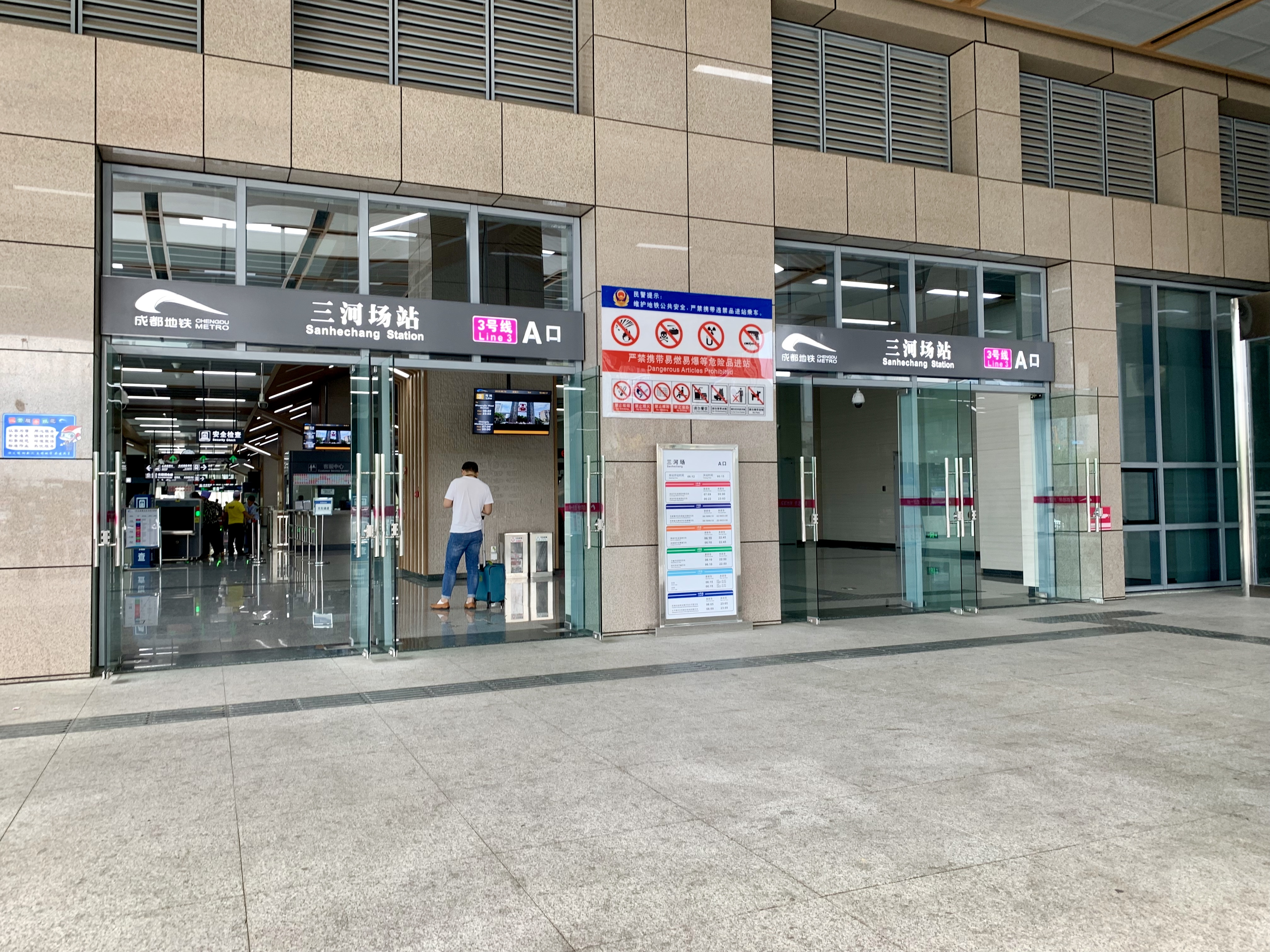
Entrance A

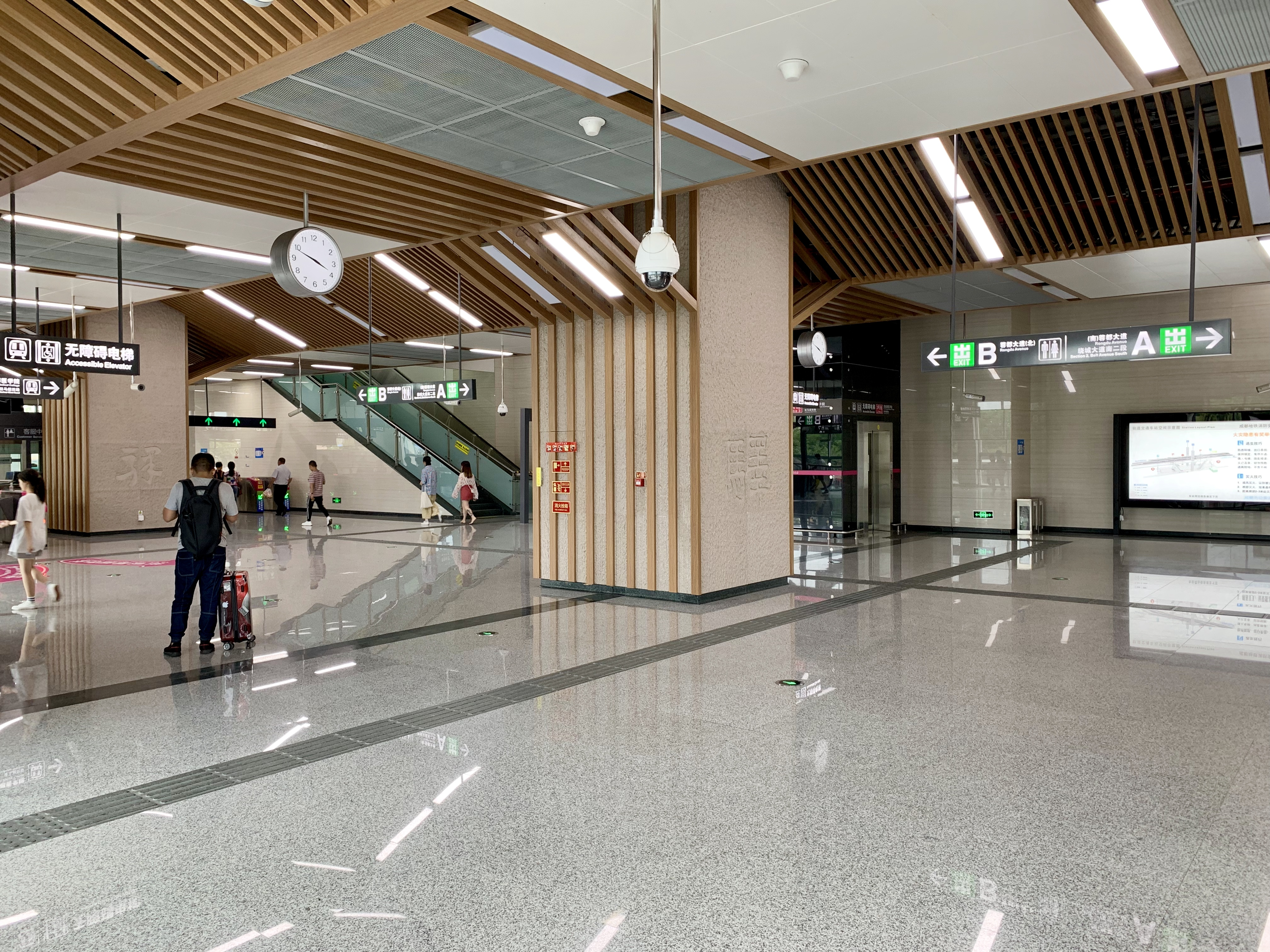
Concourse

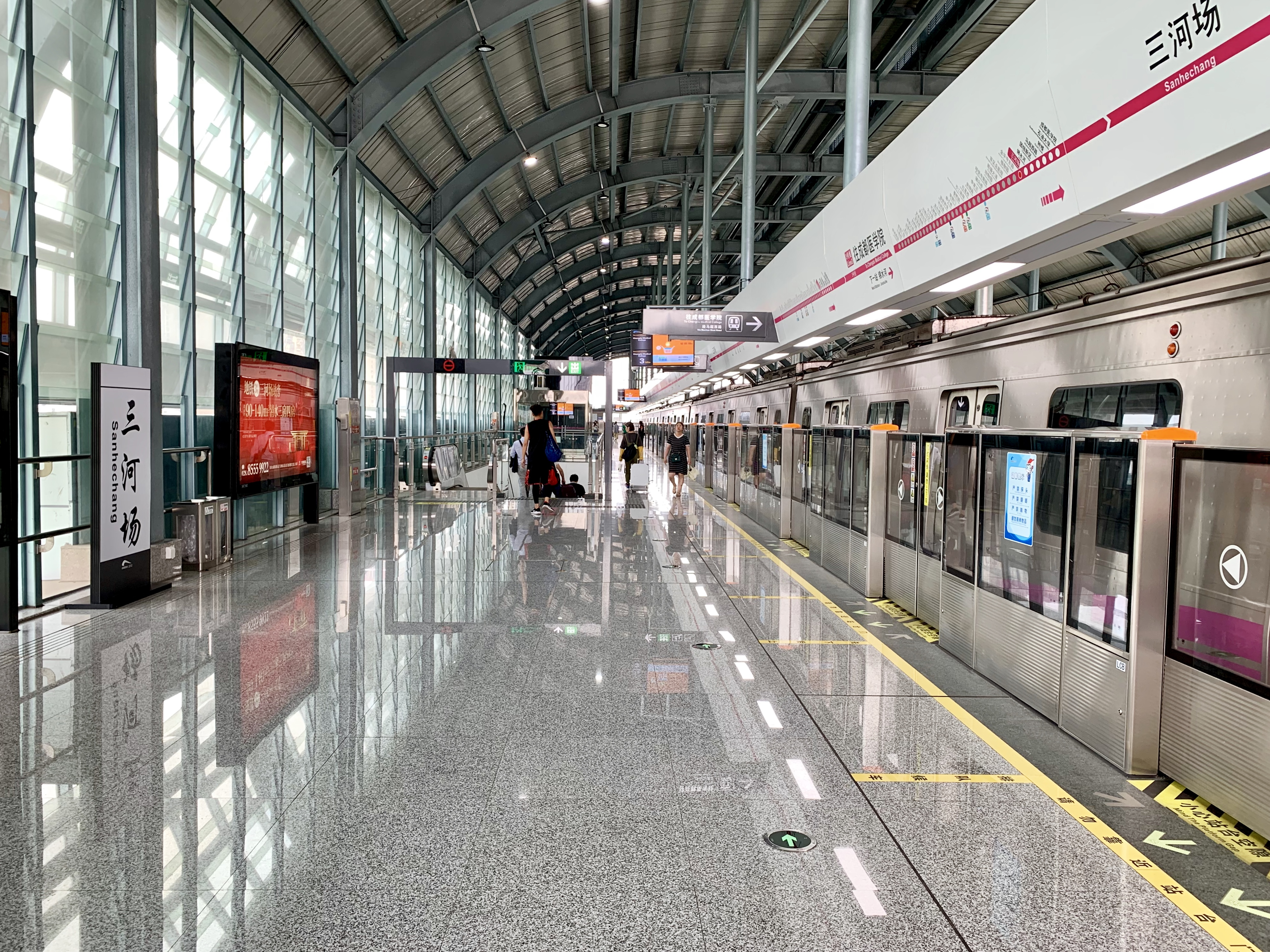
Platform
