= Jinhuasi East Road station =

Metro station in Chengdu, China

Jinhuasi East Road 金华寺东路
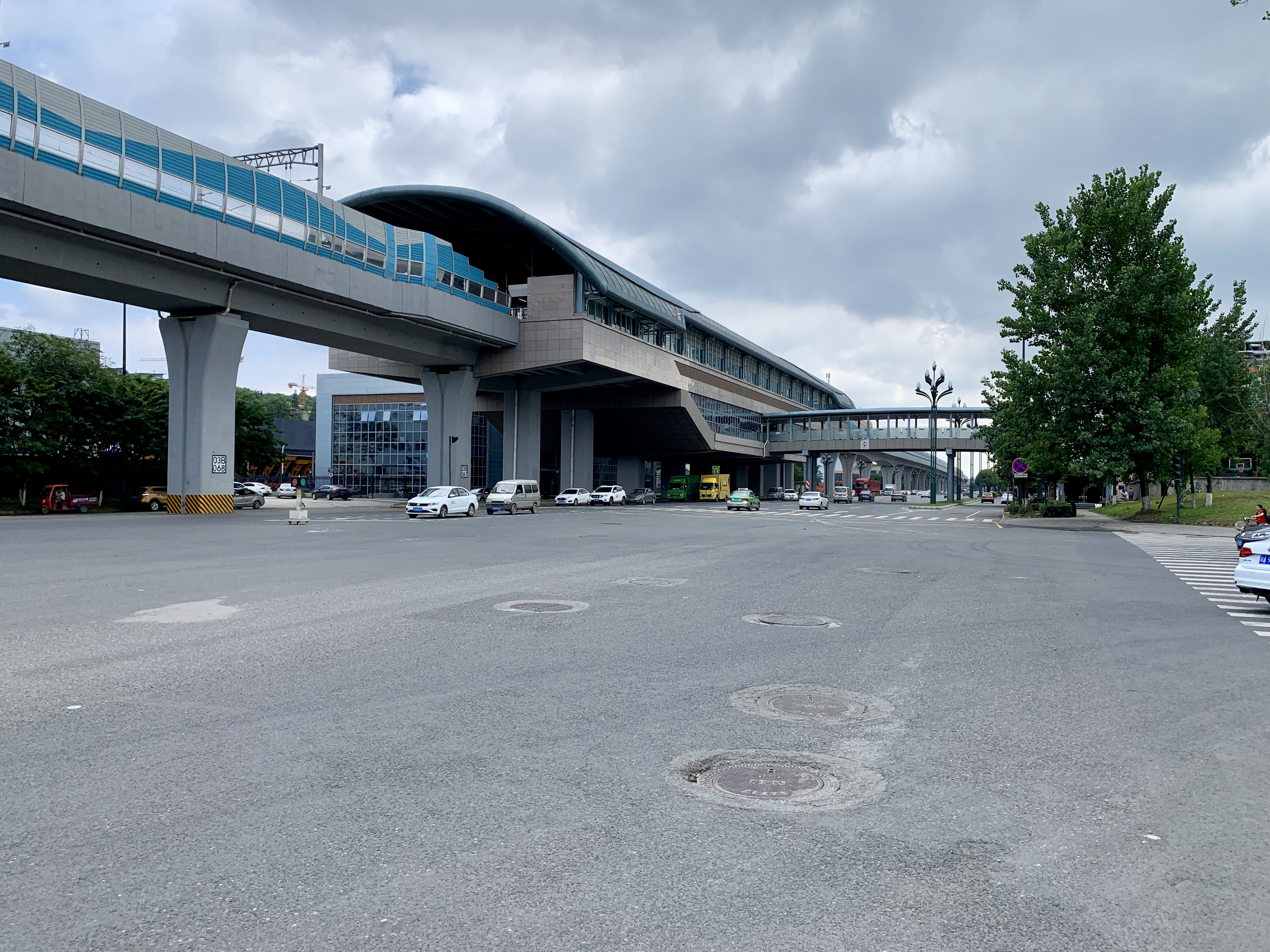

General information
- Location: Xindu District, Chengdu, Sichuan; China
- Coordinates: 30.7728215°N 104.1230129°E
- Operated by: Chengdu Metro Limited
- Line: Line 3
- Platforms: 2 (2 side platforms)

Other information
- Station code: 0308

History
- Opened: 26 December 2018
- Previous names: Jinhua Temple East Road

Services
Preceding station	Chengdu Metro	Following station
Sanhechang towards Chengdu Medical College	Line 3	Botanical Garden towards Shuangliu West Railway Station
Location

Jinhuasi East Road (Chinese: 金华寺东路), formerly known as Jinhua Temple East Road, is a station on Line 3 of the Chengdu Metro in China.

== Station layout ==
3F	Side platform, doors open on the right
3F	Northbound	← Line 3 towards Chengdu Medical College (Sanhechang)
3F	Southbound	Line 3 towards Shuangliu West Railway Station (Botanical Garden) →
3F	Side platform, doors open on the right
2F	Concourse	Faregates, Station Agent
G	Entrances and Exits	Exits B, C

== Gallery ==
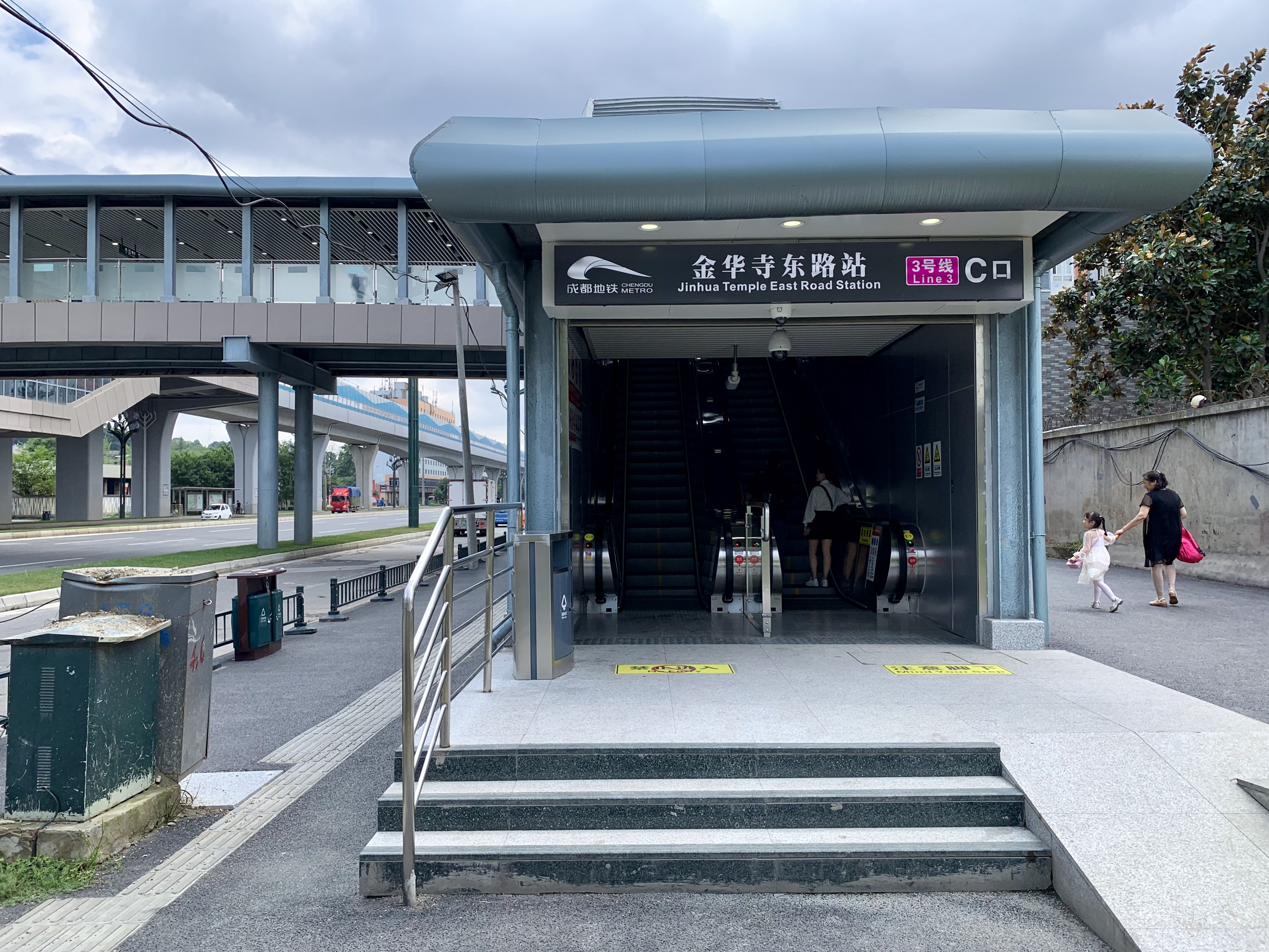
Entrance C

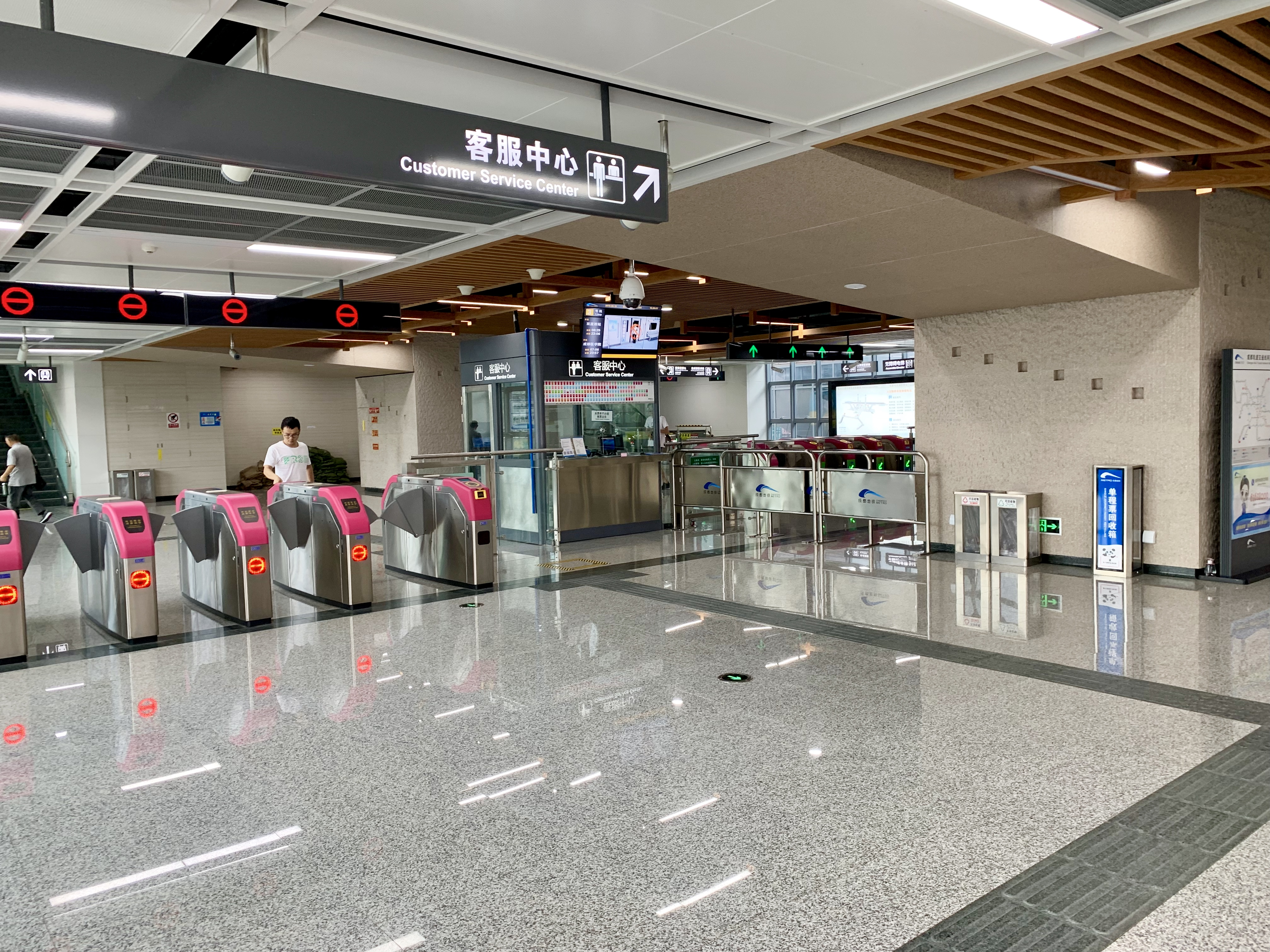
Concourse

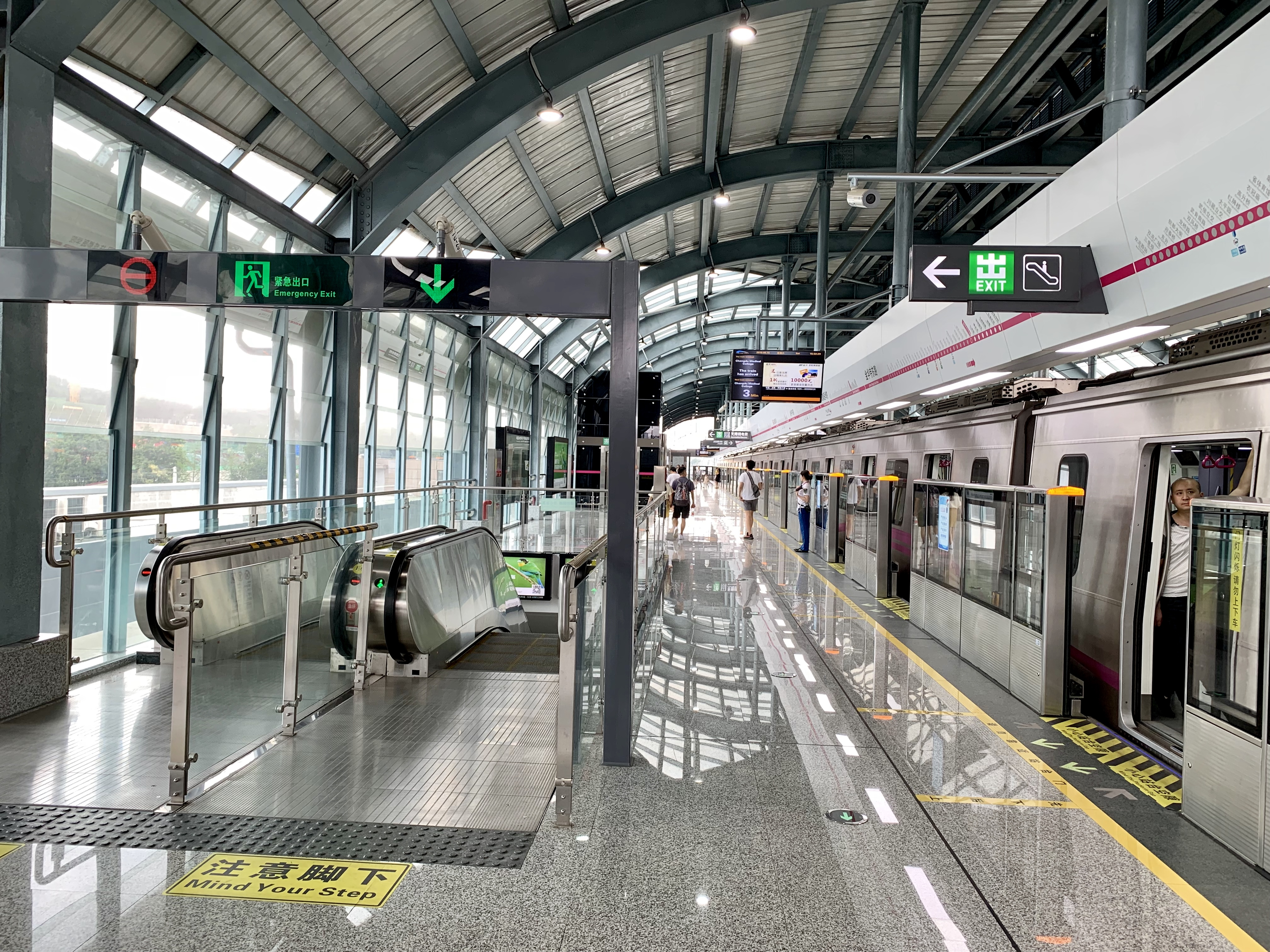
Platform
