= Chengdu Zoo station =

Metro station in Chengdu, China

Chengdu Zoo 动物园
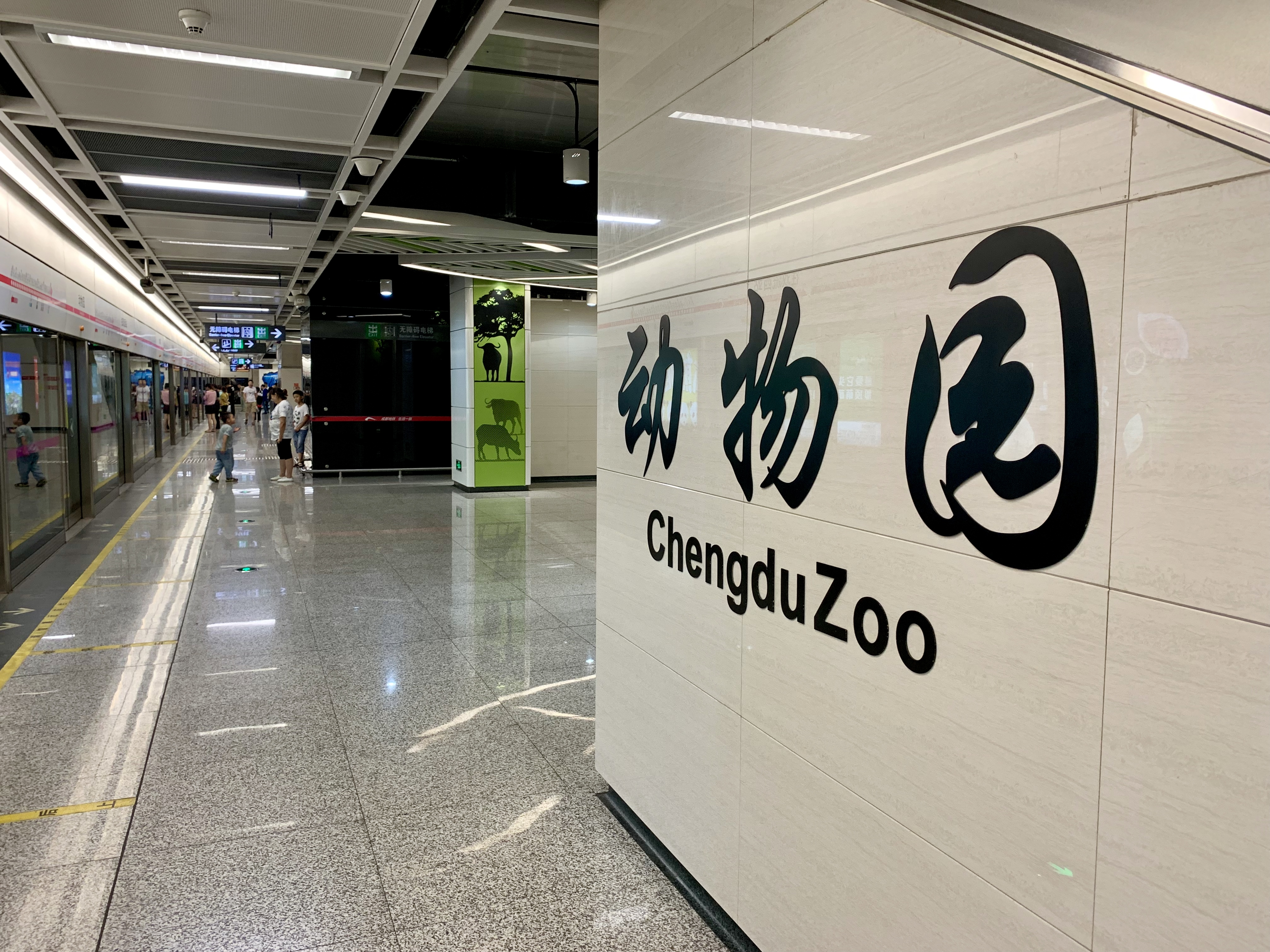

General information
- Location: Chenghua District, Chengdu, Sichuan; China
- Coordinates: 30.71599°N 104.10068°E
- Operated by: Chengdu Metro Limited
- Line(s): Line 3
- Platforms: 2 (1 island platform)

Other information
- Station code: 0312

History
- Opened: 31 July 2016

Services
| Preceding station | Chengdu Metro | Following station |
|---|---|---|
| Panda Avenue towards Chengdu Medical College | Line 3 | Zhaojuesi South Road towards Shuangliu West Railway Station |

Chengdu Zoo (Chinese: 动物园) is a station on Line 3 of the Chengdu Metro in China. It serves the nearby Chengdu Zoo and Zhaojue Temple.

== Station layout ==
| G | Entrances and Exits | Exits A-D |
| B1 | Concourse | Faregates, Station Agent |
| B2 | Northbound | ← Line 3 towards Chengdu Medical College (Panda Avenue) |
| B2 | Island platform, doors open on the left |
| B2 | Southbound | Line 3 towards Shuangliu West Railway Station (Zhaojuesi South Road) → |

== Gallery ==
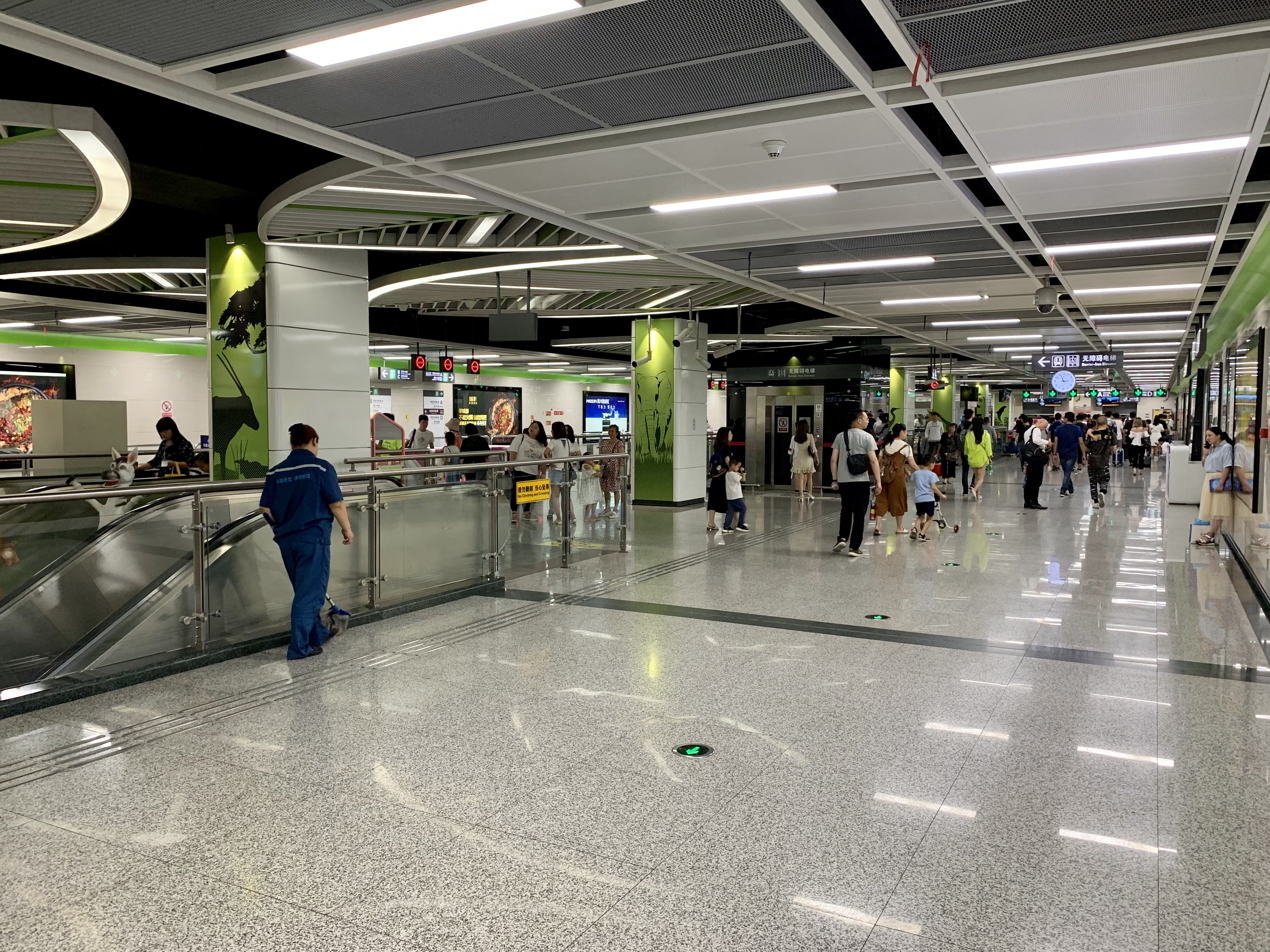
Concourse

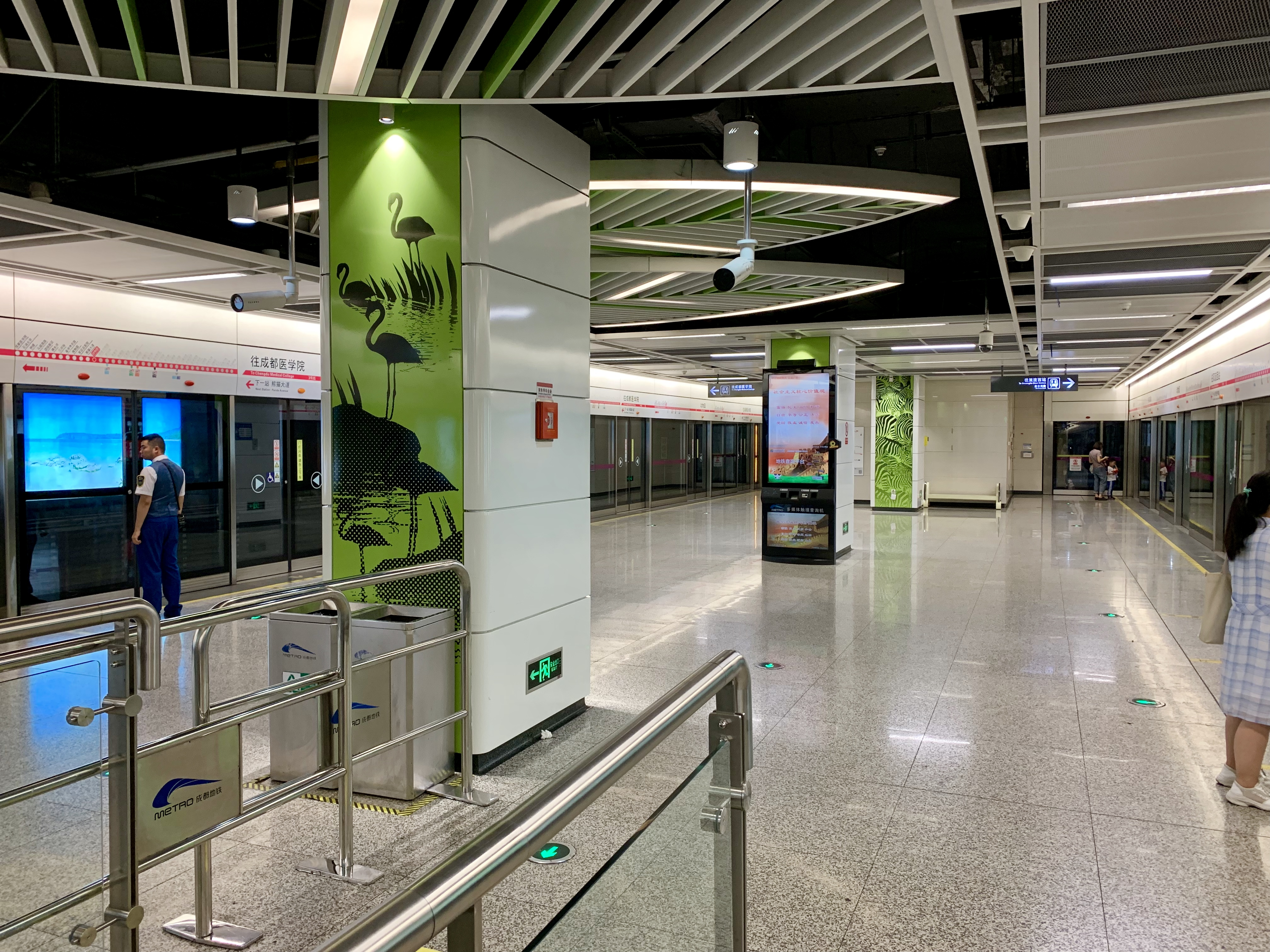
Platform
