= Panda Avenue station =

Metro station in Chengdu, China

Panda Avenue 熊猫大道
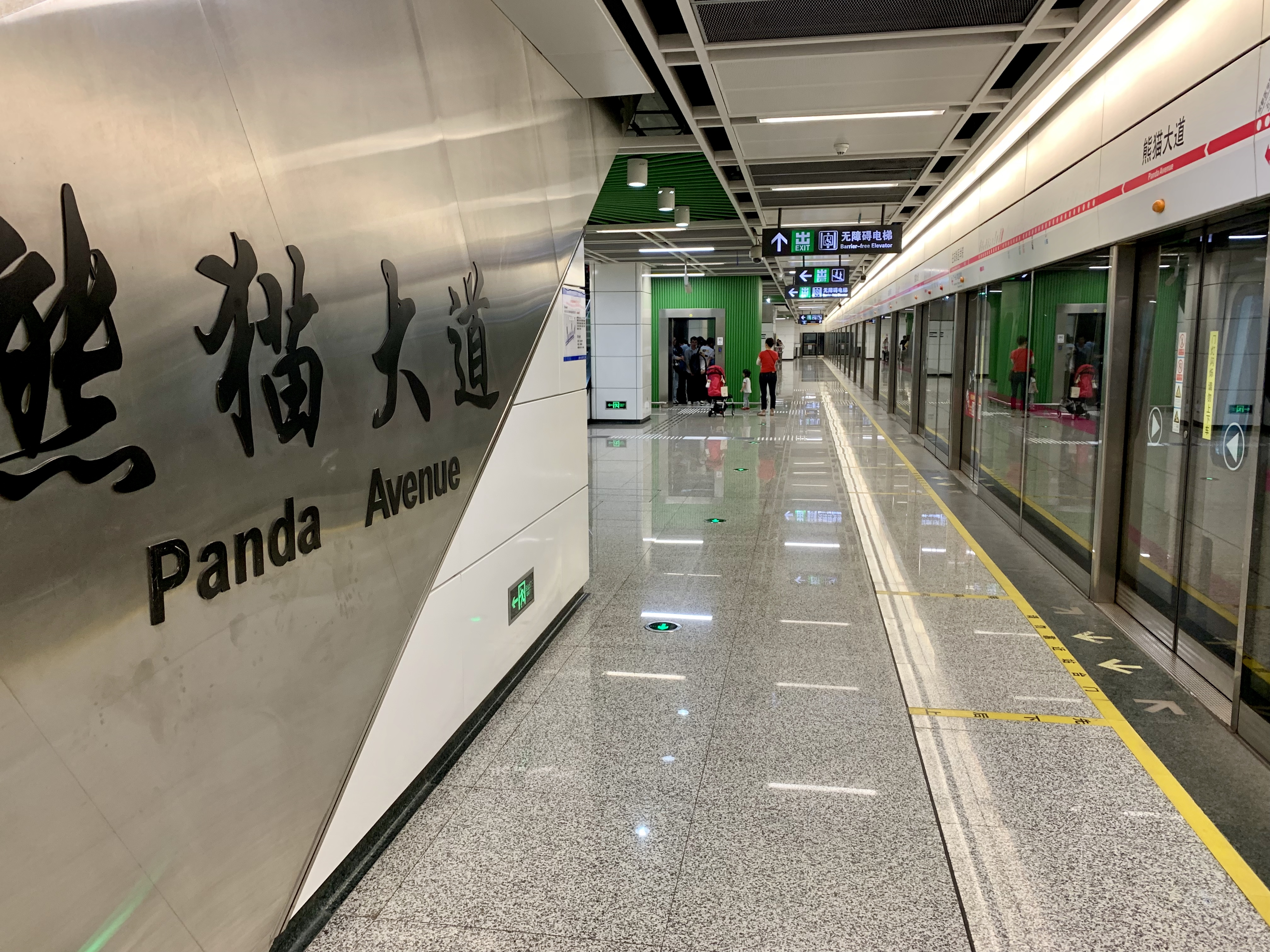

General information
- Location: Chenghua District, Chengdu, Sichuan; China
- Coordinates: 30.7280208°N 104.1056253°E
- Operated by: Chengdu Metro Limited
- Line: Line 3
- Platforms: 2 (1 island platform)

Other information
- Station code: 0311

History
- Opened: 31 July 2016

Services
Preceding station	Chengdu Metro	Following station
Chengdu Junqu General Hospital towards Chengdu Medical College	Line 3	Chengdu Zoo towards Shuangliu West Railway Station
Location

Panda Avenue (Chinese: 熊猫大道) is a station on Line 3 of the Chengdu Metro in China.

== Station layout ==
G	Entrances and Exits	Exits A, B, D
B1	Concourse	Faregates, Station Agent
B2	Northbound	← Line 3 towards Chengdu Medical College (Chengdu Junqu General Hospital)
B2	Island platform, doors open on the left
B2	Southbound	Line 3 towards Shuangliu West Station (Chengdu Zoo) →

== Gallery ==
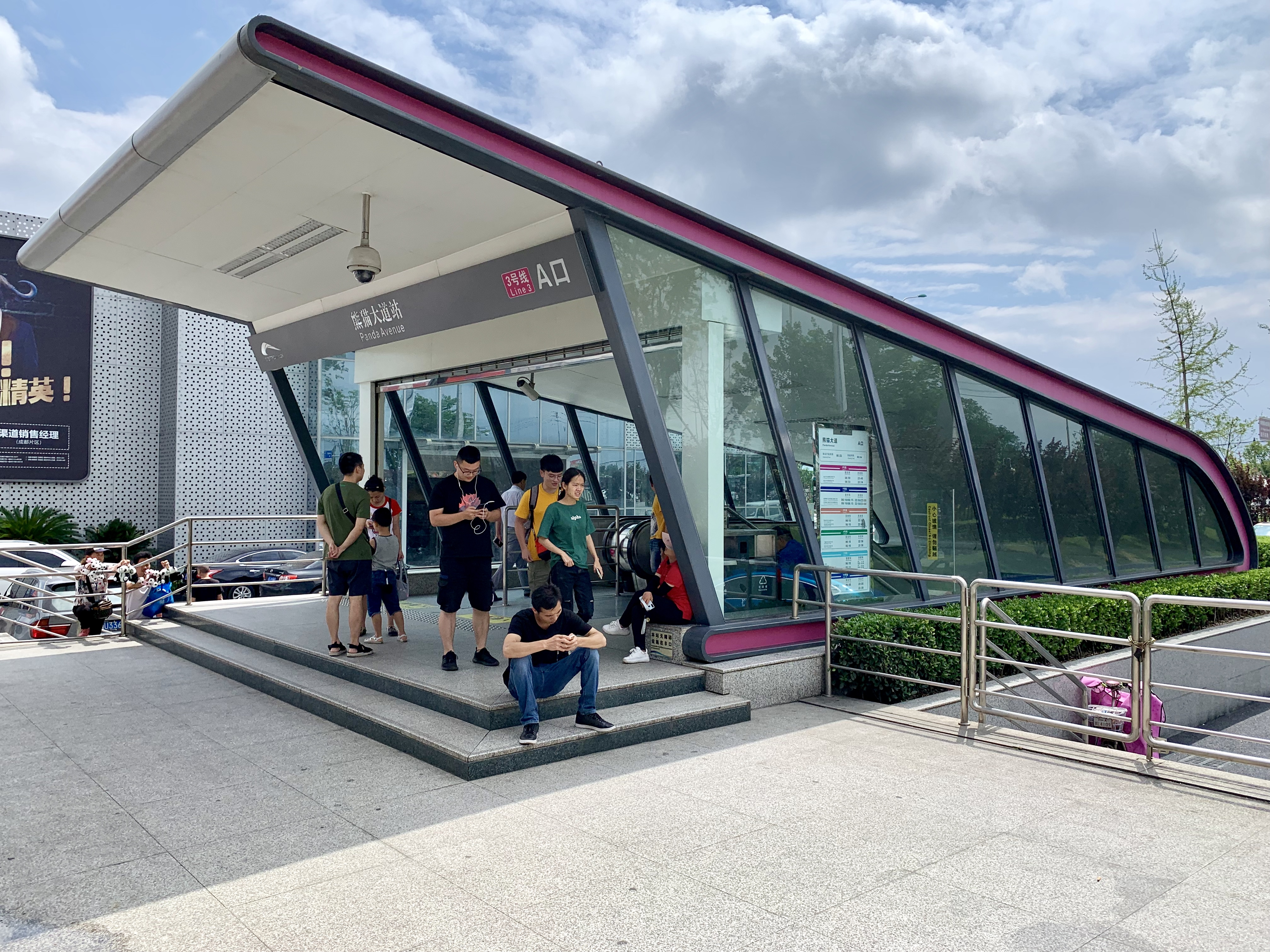
Entrance A

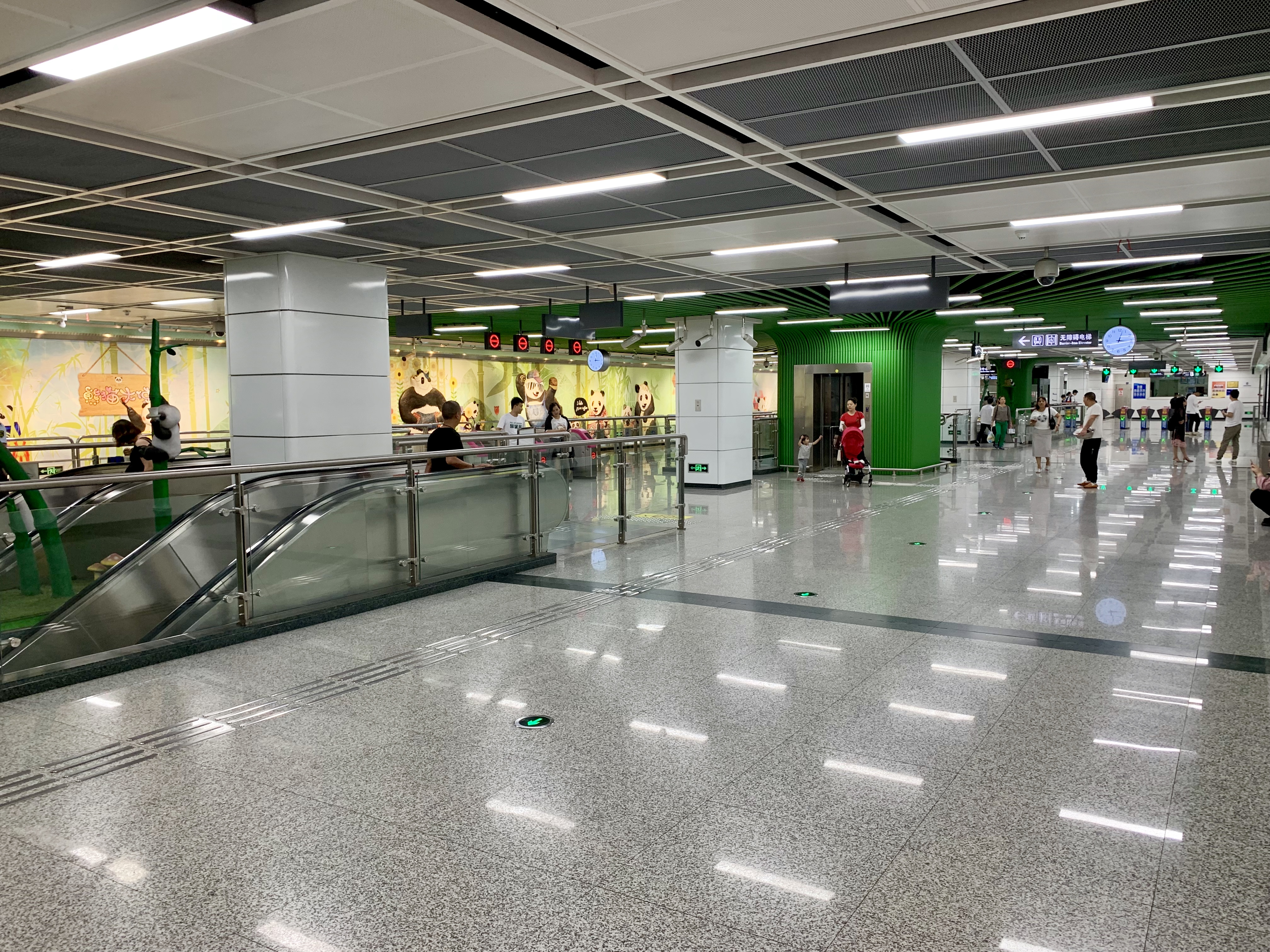
Concourse

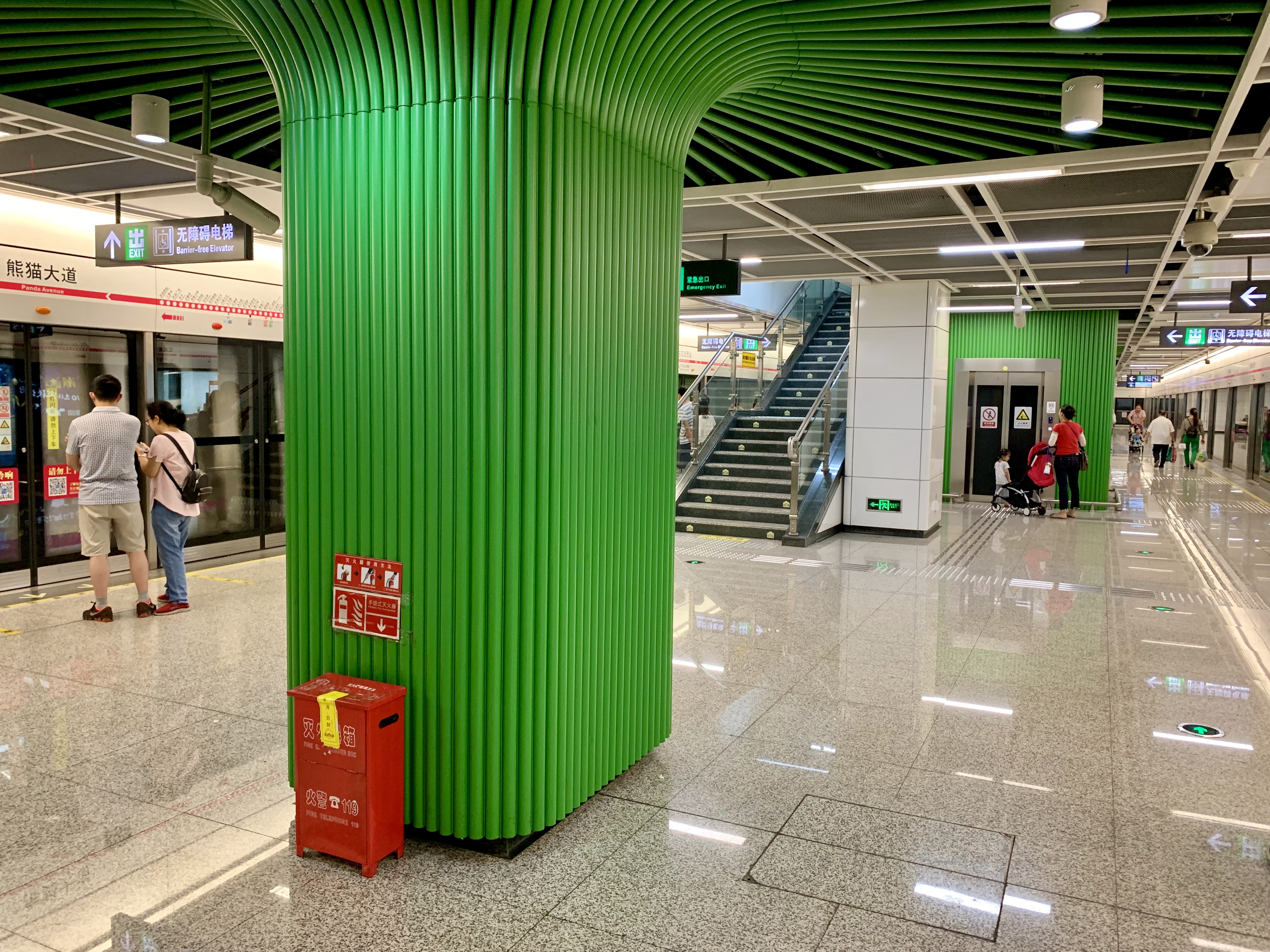
Platform
