= Chengdu Junqu General Hospital station =

Metro station in Chengdu, China

Chengdu Junqu General Hospital 军区总医院
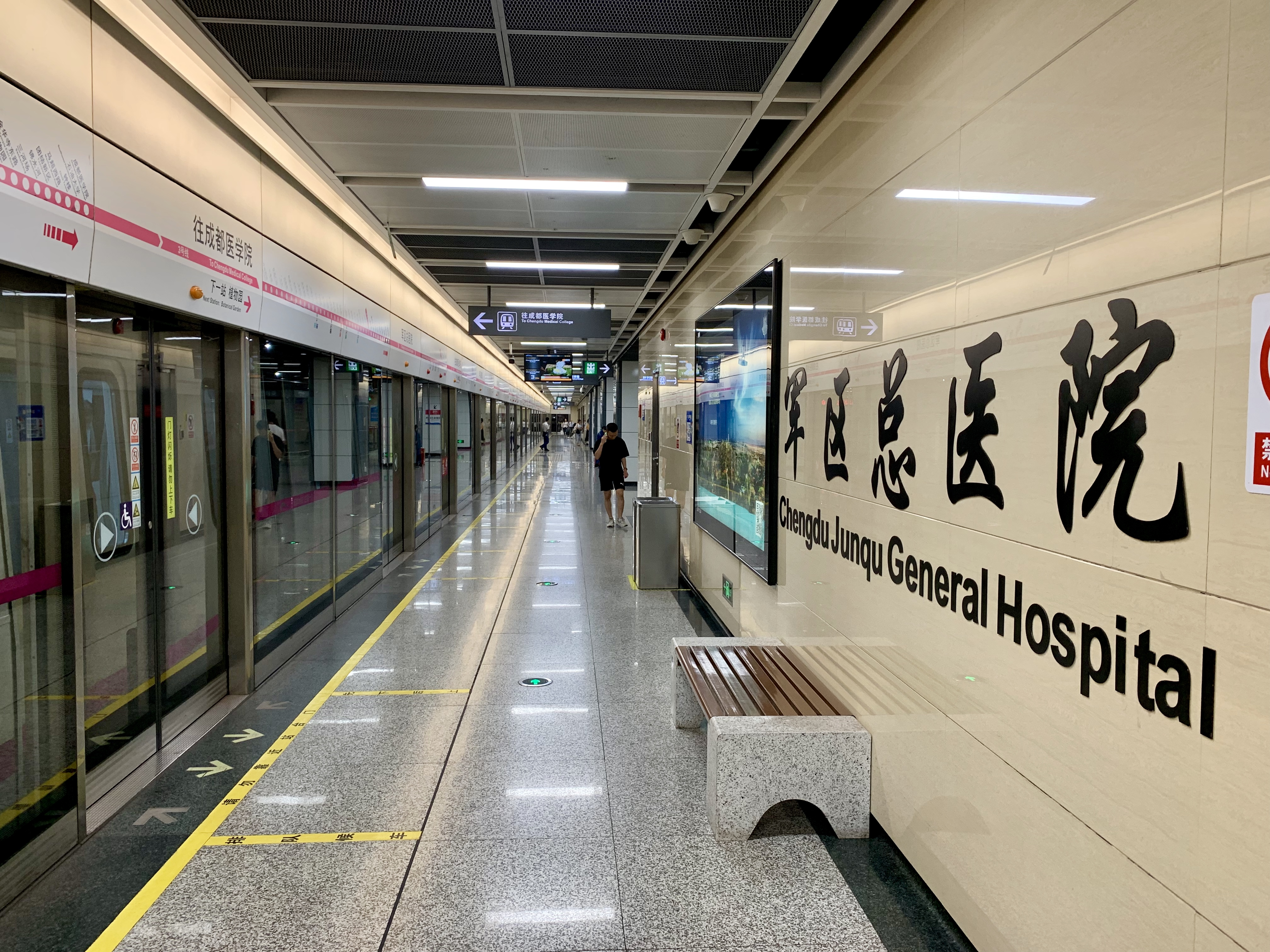

General information
- Location: Jinniu District, Chengdu, Sichuan; China
- Coordinates: 30.74701°N 104.1116°E
- Operated by: Chengdu Metro Limited
- Line: Line 3
- Platforms: 2 (2 side platforms)

Other information
- Station code: 0310

History
- Opened: 31 July 2016

Services
| Preceding station | Chengdu Metro | Following station |
|---|---|---|
| Botanical Garden towards Chengdu Medical College | Line 3 | Panda Avenue towards Shuangliu West Railway Station |
Location

Chengdu Junqu General Hospital (Chinese: 军区总医院) is a station on Line 3 of the Chengdu Metro in China.

== Station layout ==
| G | Entrances and Exits | Exits A-D |
| B1 | Concourse | Faregates, Station Agent |
| B1 | Side platform, doors open on the right |
| B1 | Northbound | ← Line 3 towards Chengdu Medical College (Botanical Garden) |
| B1 | Southbound | Line 3 towards Shuangliu West Station (Panda Avenue) → |
| B1 | Side platform, doors open on the right |
| B1 | Concourse | Faregates, Station Agent |
| B2 | Underpass |

== Gallery ==
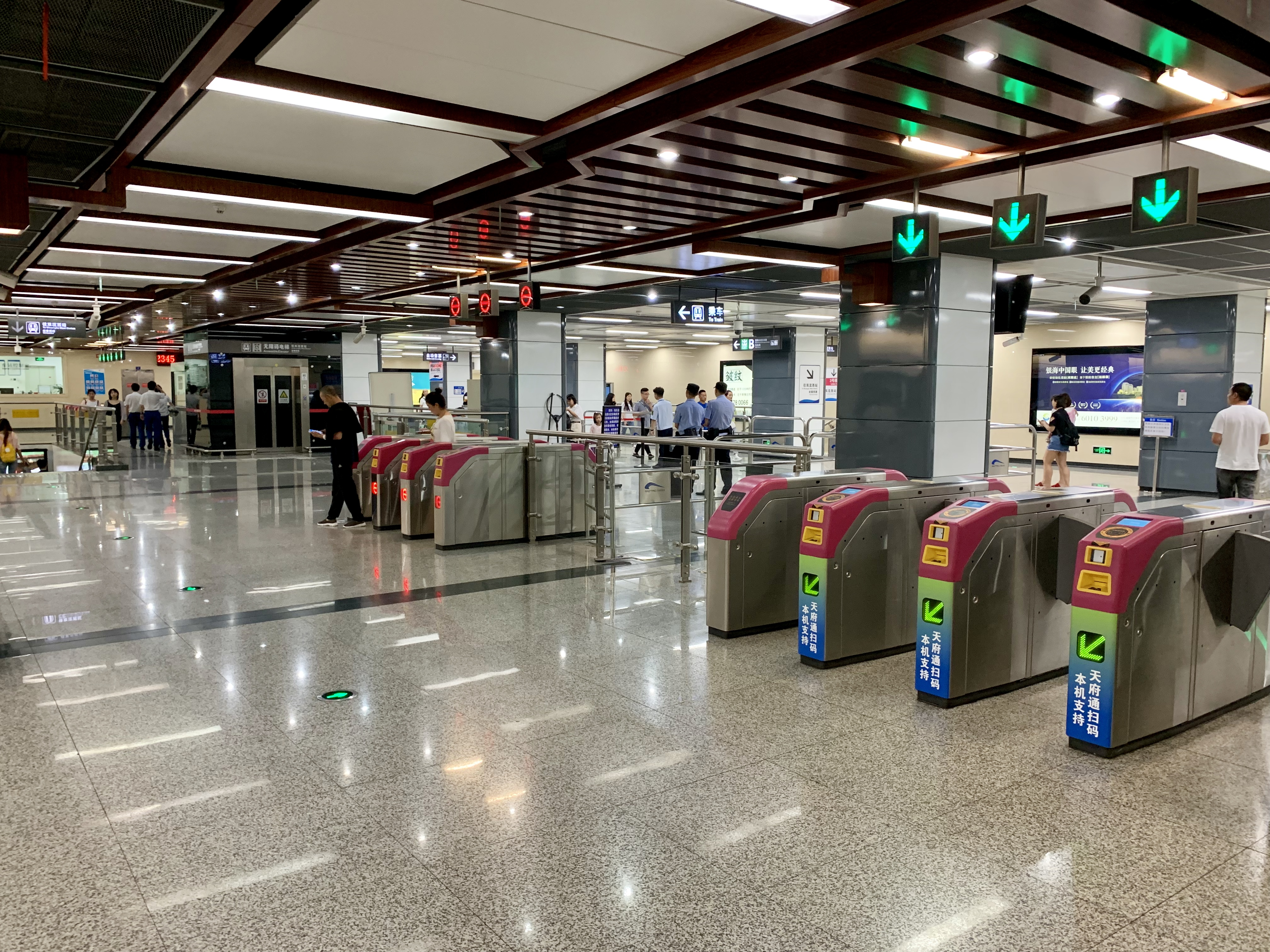
Concourse

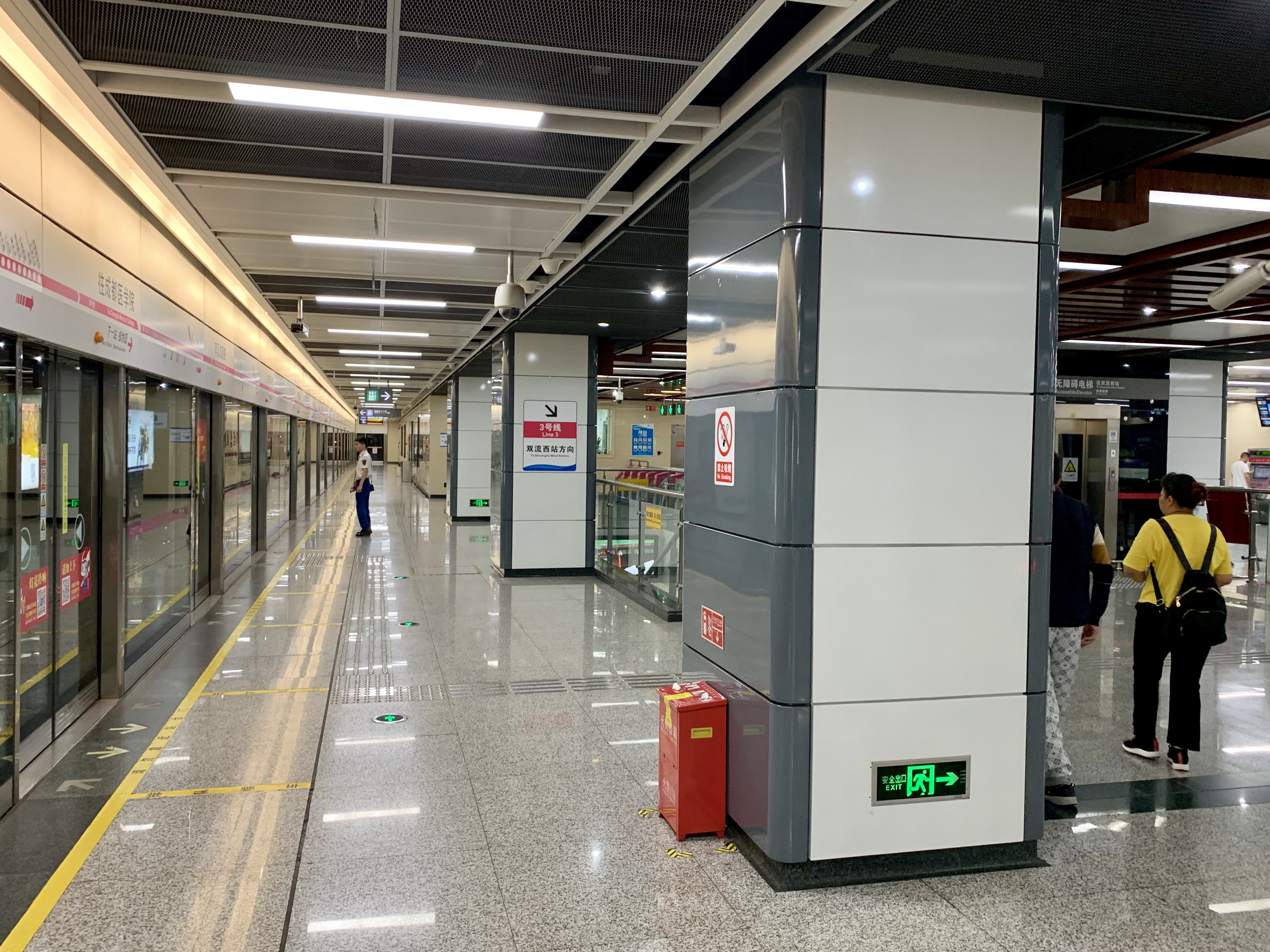
Platform

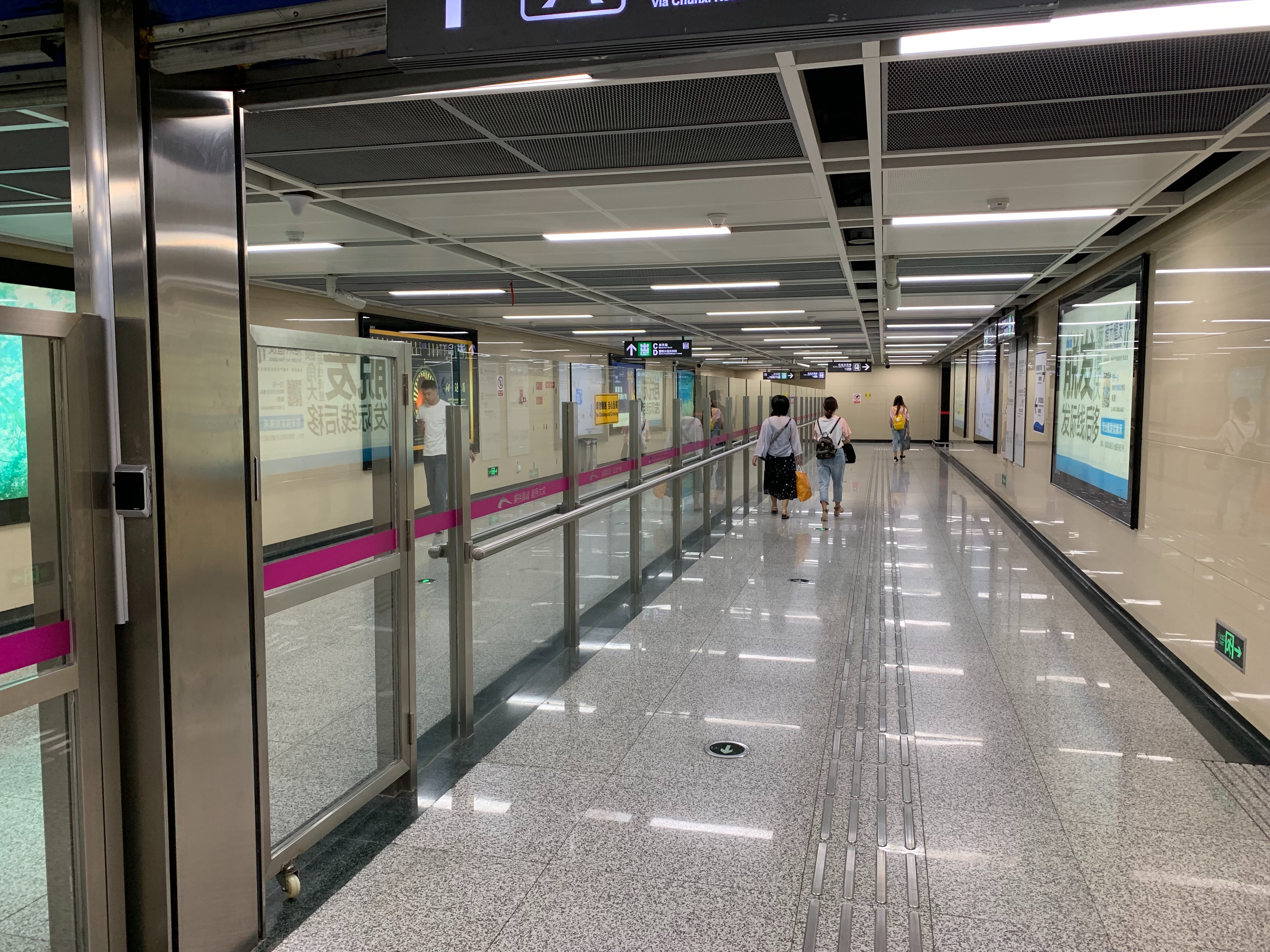
Transfer Corridor
