= Zhaojuesi South Road station =

Metro station in Chengdu, China

Zhaojuesi South Road 昭觉寺南路
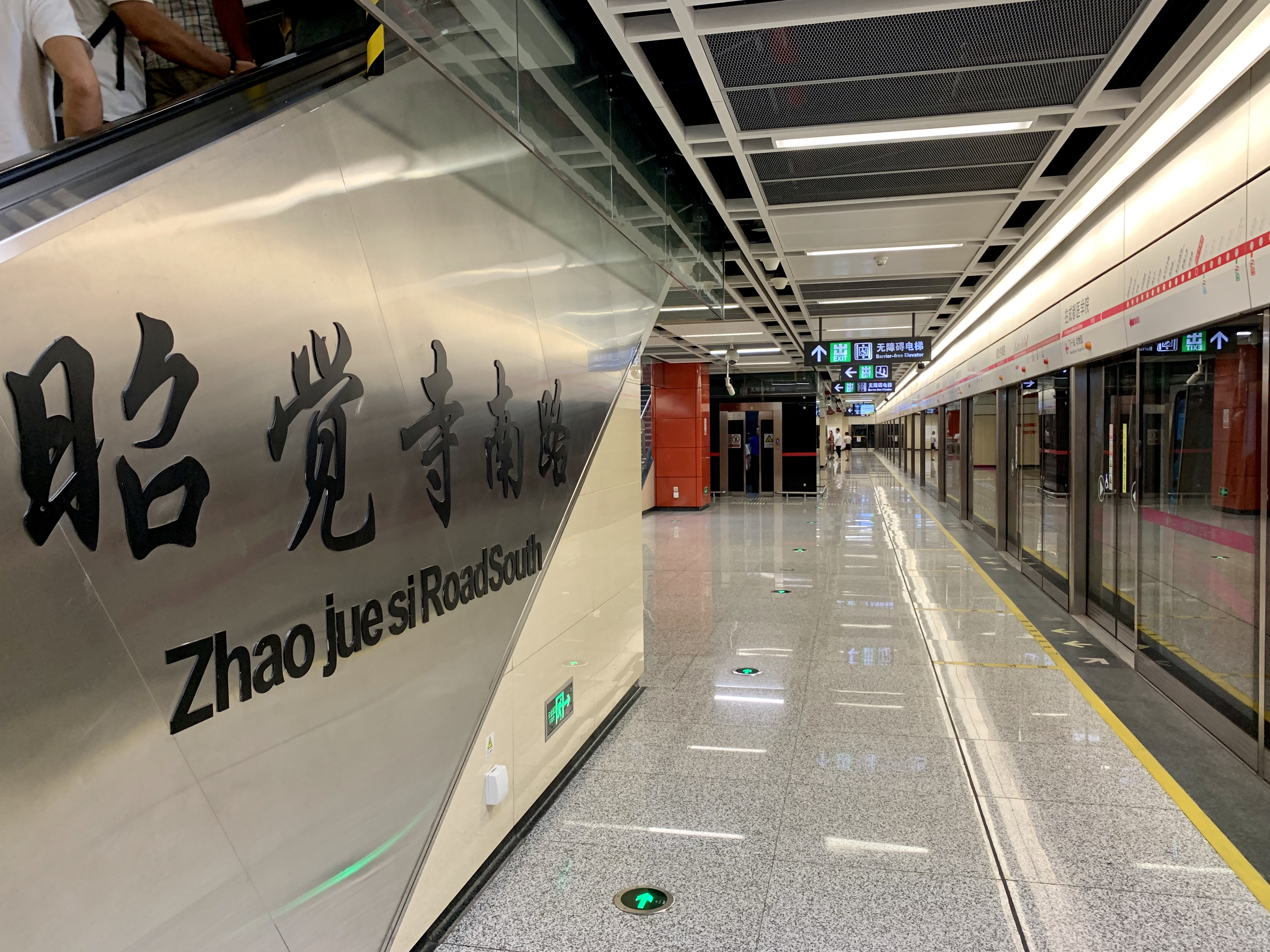

General information
- Location: Chenghua District, Chengdu, Sichuan; China
- Coordinates: 30.70554°N 104.09447°E
- Operated by: Chengdu Metro Limited
- Line(s): Line 3
- Platforms: 2 (1 island platform)

Other information
- Station code: 0313

History
- Opened: 31 July 2016
- Previous names: Zhaojuesi Road South

Services
Preceding station	Chengdu Metro	Following station
Chengdu Zoo towards Chengdu Medical College	Line 3	Sima Bridge towards Shuangliu West Railway Station

Zhaojuesi South Road (Chinese: 昭觉寺南路),formerly known as Zhaojuesi Road South, is a station on Line 3 of the Chengdu Metro in China.

== Station layout ==
G	Entrances and Exits	Exits A, C-E
B1	Concourse	Faregates, Station Agent
B2	Northbound	← Line 3 towards Chengdu Medical College (Chengdu Zoo)
B2	Island platform, doors open on the left
B2	Southbound	Line 3 towards Shuangliu West Railway Station (Sima Bridge) →

== Gallery ==
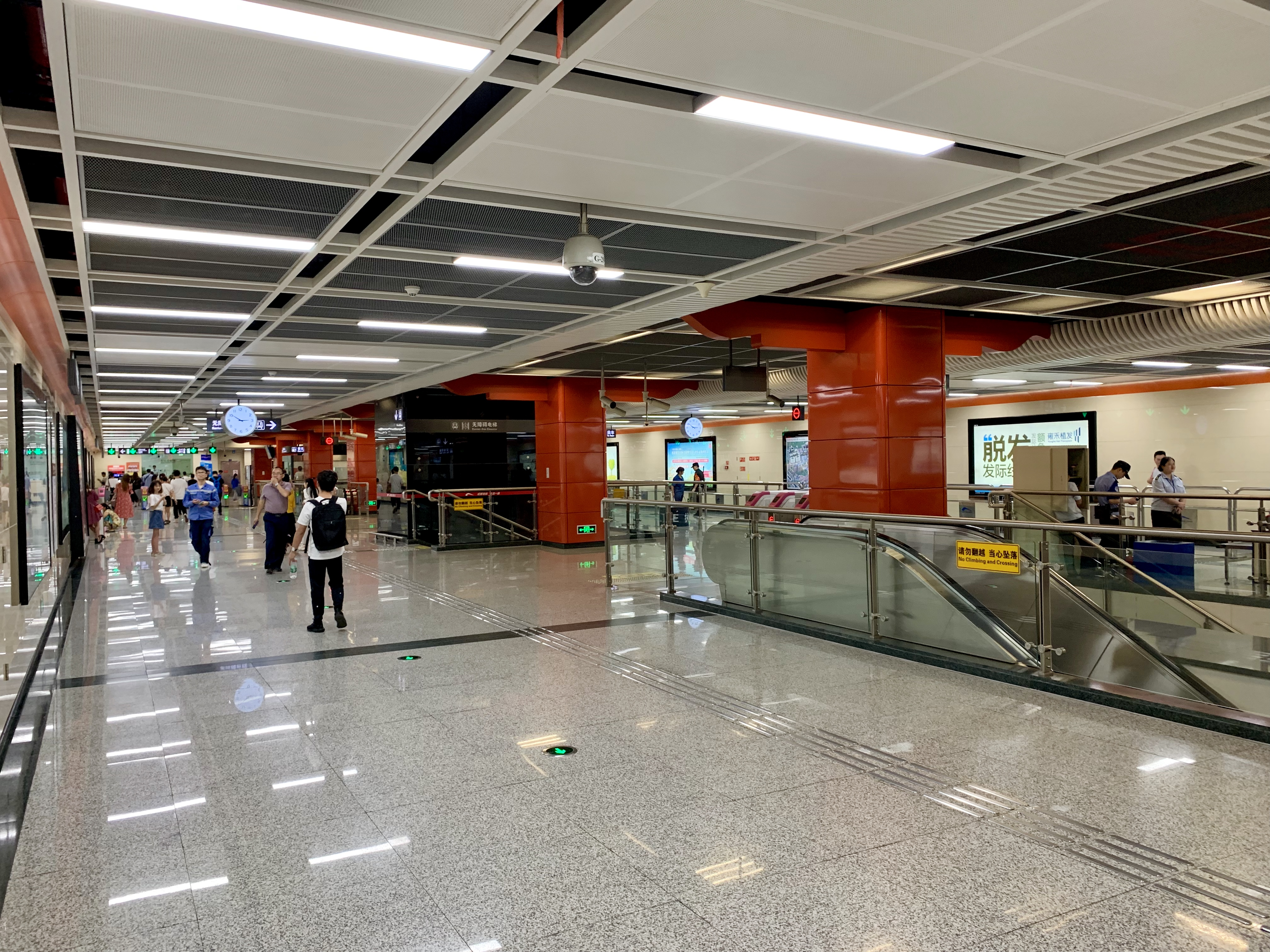
Concourse

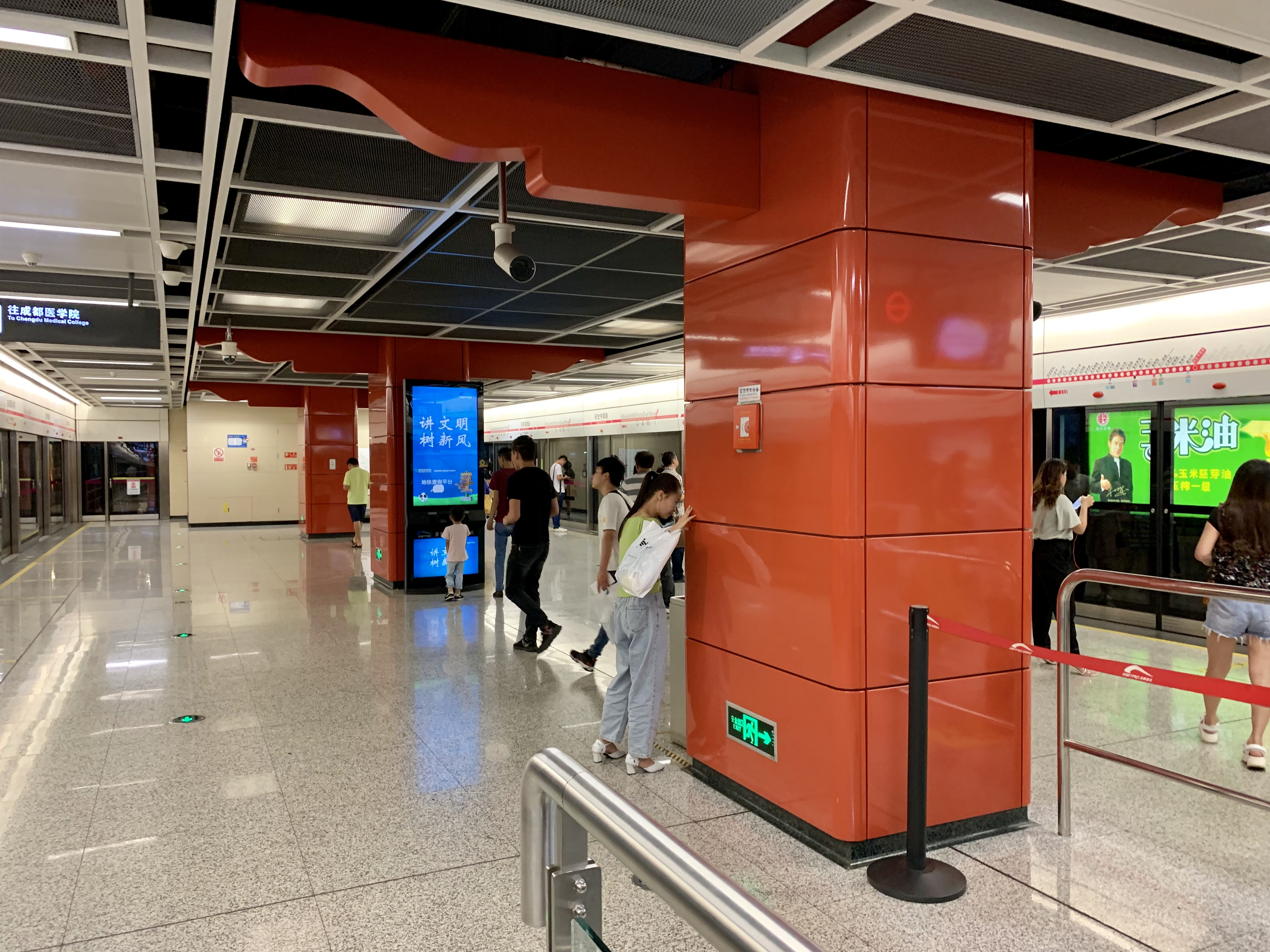
Platform
