= Zhaojue Temple =

Buddhist temple in Sichuan, China

- 昭觉寺
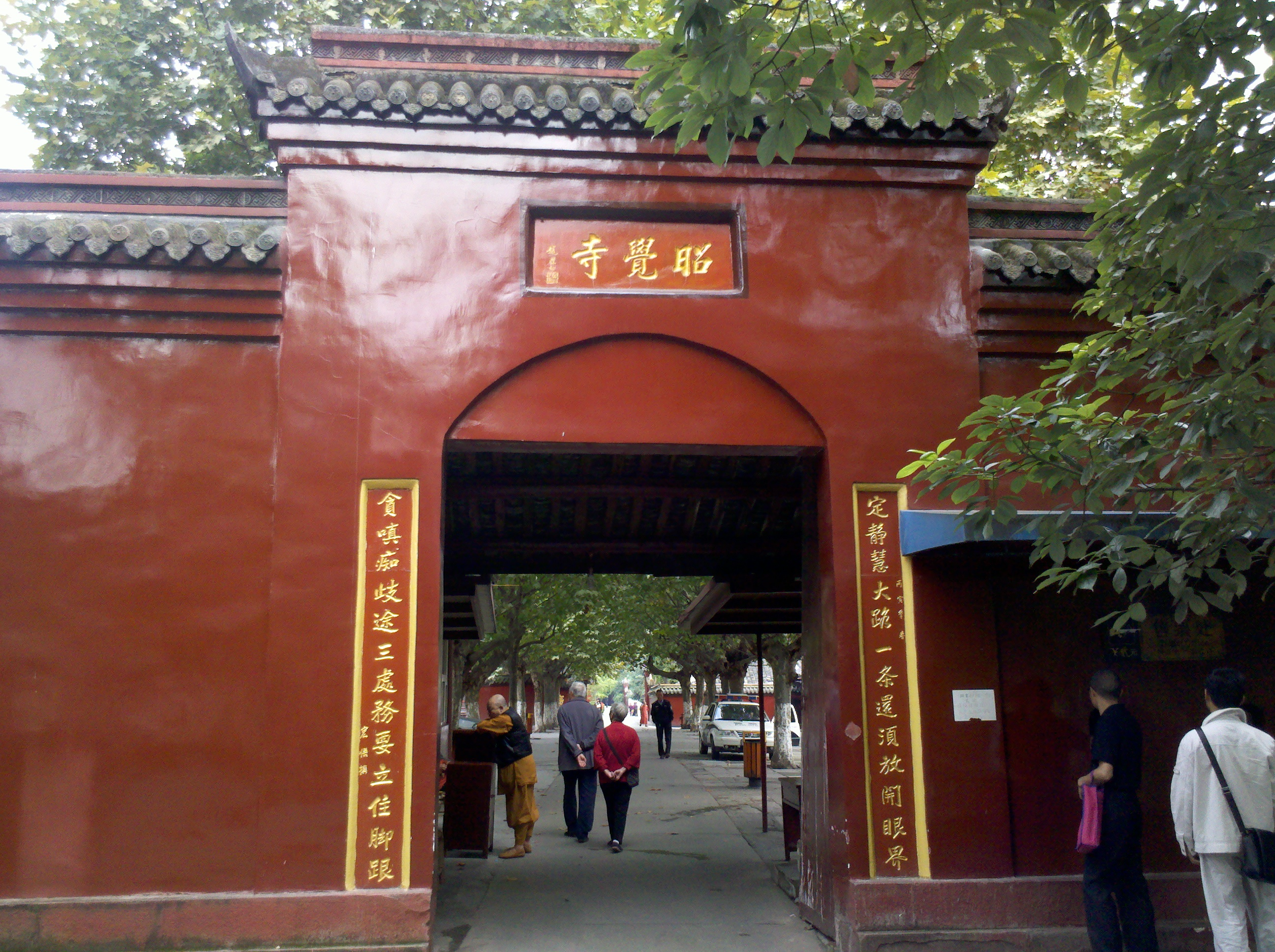
- The Shanmen of Zhaojue Temple.

- Location within Sichuan Location within China

Religion
- Affiliation: Buddhism
- Sect: Linji school
- Leadership: Shi Yanfa (释演法)

Location
- Location: Chenghua District, Chengdu, Sichuan
- Country: China
- Interactive map of Zhaojue Temple
- Coordinates: 30°42′52″N 104°06′46″E

Architecture
- Style: Chinese architecture
- Established: Zhenguan period (627–649)
- Completed: 1984 (reconstruction)

Zhaojue Temple (simplified Chinese: 昭觉寺; traditional Chinese: 昭覺寺; pinyin: Zhāojué Sì) is a Buddhist temple located in Chenghua District of Chengdu, Sichuan, China. Zhaojue Temple has been burned down and rebuilt several times, due to natural disasters and wars; the modern temple was completed in 1984.

== History ==
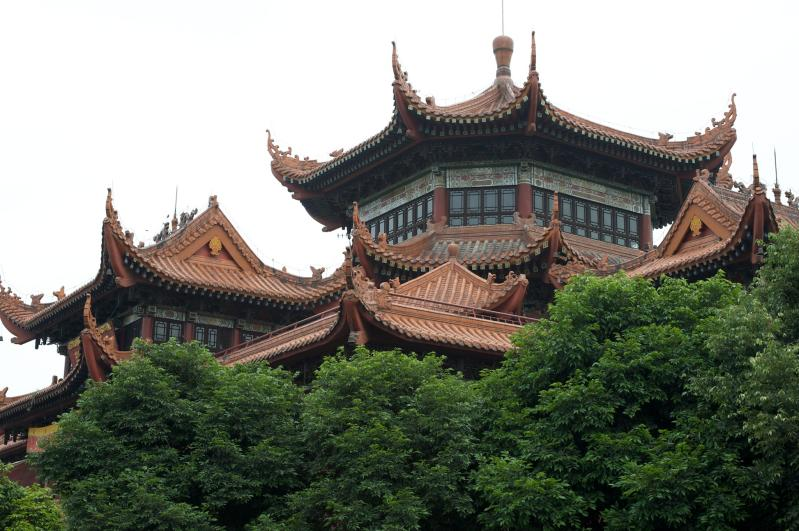
The Octagonal Pavilion.

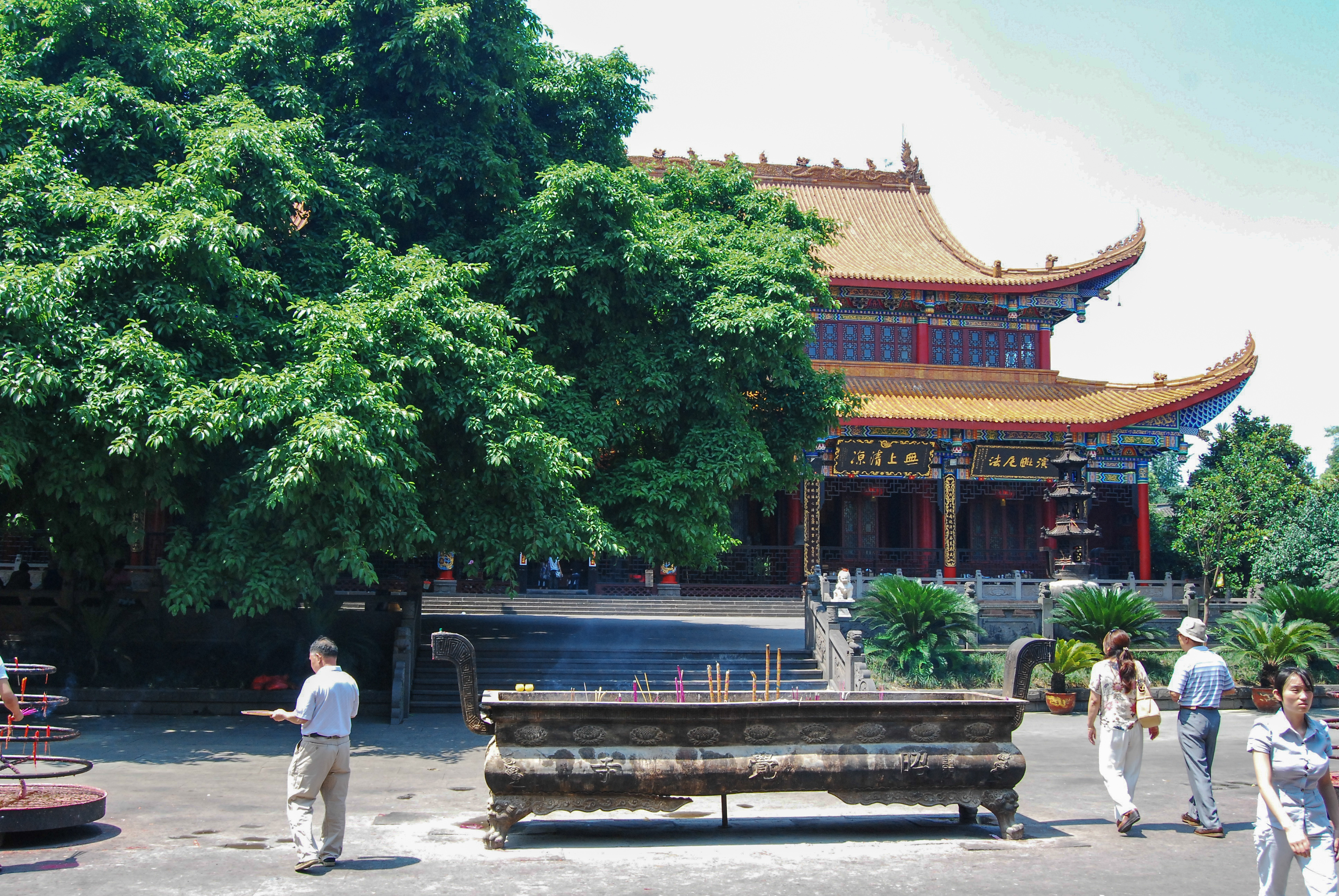
The Mahavira Hall.

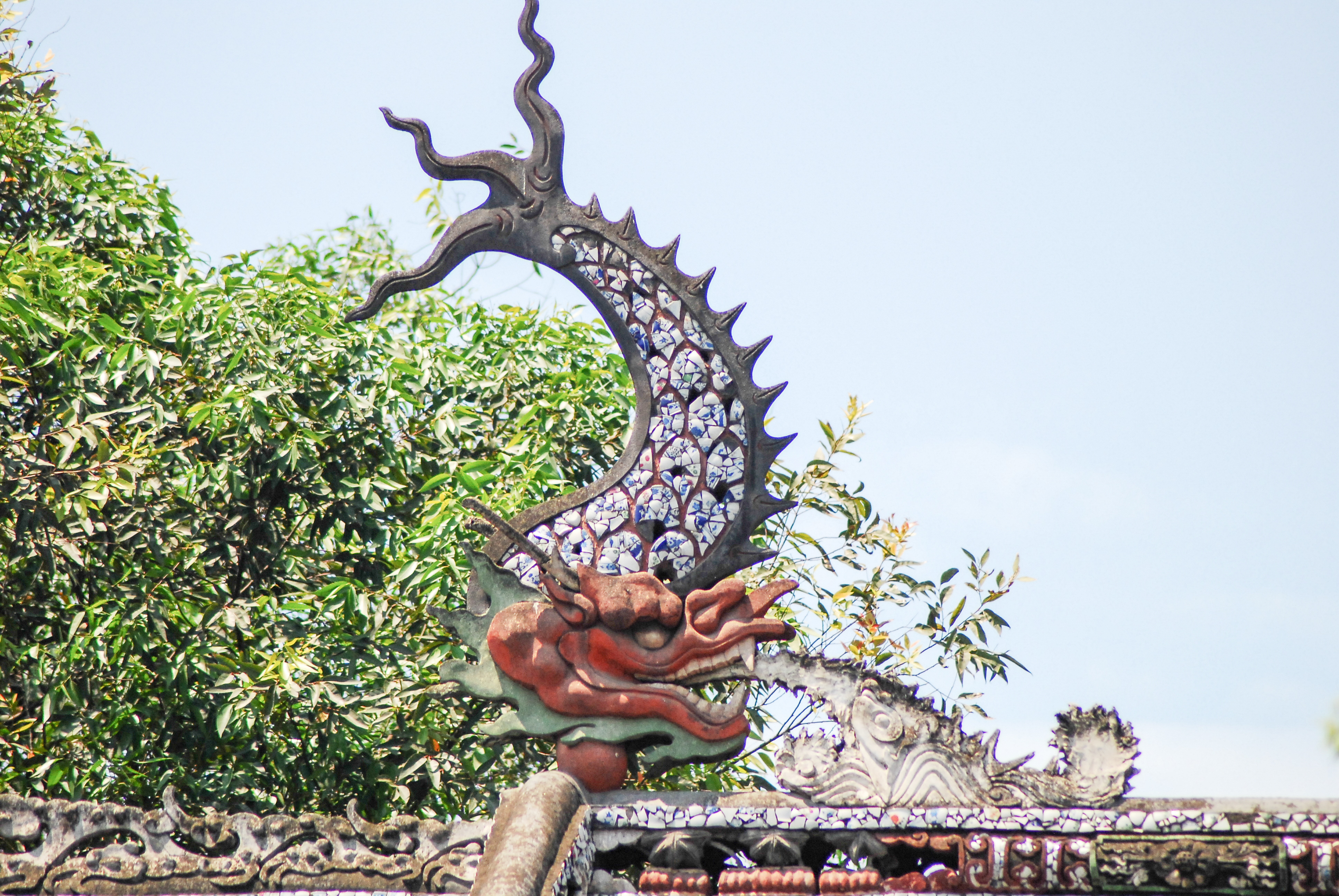
A Chiwen on the roof.

=== Tang dynasty ===
The original temple dates back to the 7th century, during the Zhenguan period (627–649) of the Tang dynasty (618–907). At that time it was called "Jianyuan Temple" (建元寺). In the 9th century, Emperor Xuanzong (847–860) renamed it "Zhaojue Temple".

In 877, in the reign of Emperor Xizong (874–888), master Xiumeng (修梦) was proposed as the new abbot of the temple. During his tenure, Zhaojue Temple was largely extended.

=== Five Dynasties and Ten Kingdoms period ===
Zhaojue Temple was badly damaged in wars during the Five Dynasties and Ten Kingdoms period (907–960).

=== Song dynasty ===
In 1008, in the region of Emperor Zhenzong of the Song dynasty (960–1279), master Yanmei (延美) was unanimously chosen as abbot of Zhaojue Temple. He spent 30 years restoring the temple. Under his leadership, the temple reached over 300 halls and buildings, an unprecedented amount for the temple.

In the late Northern Song and early Southern Song dynasties, Yuanwu Keqin, an accomplished Chan master, served two separate terms as abbot of Zhaojue Temple and died there.

=== Ming dynasty ===
In 1387, in the 20th year of the Hongwu period of the newly founded Ming dynasty (1368–1644), Hongwu Emperor ordered Prince Xian to invite master Zhirun (智润) to the temple as the new abbot. Under the support of central government, the temple experienced a resurgence of religiosity.

In 1644, the year of the fall of the Ming dynasty, Zhaojue Temple was devastated by wars. It was later refurbished and redecorated by master Poshan (破山).

=== Qing dynasty ===
In 1663, in the Kangxi era of the Qing dynasty (1644–1911), abbot Zhangxue (丈雪) renovated Zhaojue Temple. Mahavira Hall, Four Heavenly Kings Hall, Buddhist Texts Library, Yuanjue Hall, and Octagonal Pavilion were added to the temple. Ten years later, abbot Foyuan (佛冤) erected the Five Contemplations Dining Hall, Bell tower, Drum tower, and monk's apartment.

=== Republic of China ===
In May 1920, Zhu De, the then brigade commander of Yunnan National Protection Army, was defeated by Xiong Kewu (熊克武), commander of Sichuan Army. He took refuge in Zhaojue Temple.

=== People's Republic of China ===
In 1966, Mao Zedong launched the Cultural Revolution and the Red Guards attacked the temple. Almost all volumes of sutras, historical documents, statues and other works of art were either removed, damaged or destroyed. In the late Cultural Revolution, the temple became a part of the Beijiao Park.

After the 3rd plenary session of the 11th Central Committee of the Chinese Communist Party, according to the national policy of free religious belief, the temple reactivated its religious activities.

Zhaojue Temple has been classified as a National Key Buddhist Temple in Han Chinese Area by the State Council of China in 1983. The reconstruction project of the temple was launched in the following year. Shanmen, Octagonal Pavilion, Four Heavenly Kings Hall, Hall of Ksitigarbha, Hall of Guanyin, Hall of Skanda, Buddhist Texts Library, Five Contemplations Dining Hall, Stone Buddha Hall, and Xianjue Hall were all gradually rebuilt.

== Architecture ==
=== Mahavira Hall ===
The Mahavira Hall enshrines the Three-Body Buddha, namely Vairocana, Rocana, and Sakyamuni. The two disciples' statues are placed in front of the statue of Sakyamuni; the older is called Kassapa Buddha and the middle-aged is called Ananda. The statues of Eighteen Arhats stand on both sides of the hall.
