= Wuqing South Road station =

Metro station in Chengdu, China

Wuqing South Road 武青南路
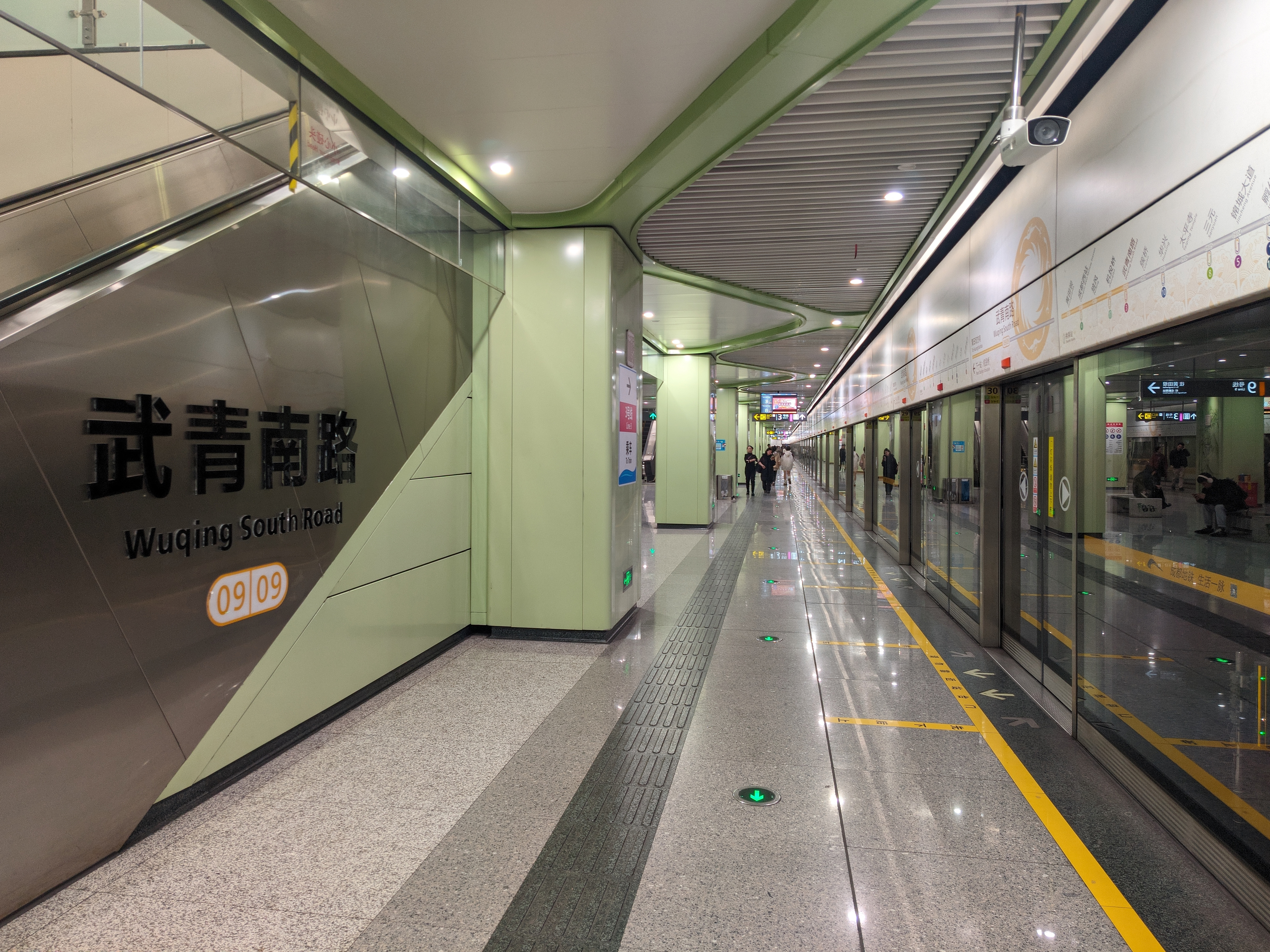
- Line 9 platform

General information
- Location: Wuhou District, Chengdu, Sichuan; China
- Coordinates: 30.6257°N 103.9828°E
- Operated by: Chengdu Metro Limited
- Lines: Line 3 Line 9
- Platforms: 4 (2 island platforms)

Other information
- Station code: 0329 0909

History
- Opened: 26 December 2018

Services
Preceding station	Chengdu Metro	Following station
Wuhou Flyover towards Chengdu Medical College	Line 3	Shuangfengqiao towards Shuangliu West Railway Station
Cuqiao towards Financial City East	Line 9	Jitouqiao towards Huangtianba
Location

Wuqing South Road (Chinese: 武青南路) is a station on Line 3 and Line 9 of the Chengdu Metro in China.

== Station layout ==
G	Entrances and Exits	Exits A-F
B1	Concourse	Faregates, Station Agent
B2	Northbound	← Line 3 towards Chengdu Medical College (Wuhou Flyover)
B2	Island platform, doors open on the left
B2	Southbound	Line 3 towards Shuangliu West Station (Shuangfengqiao) →
B3	Northbound	← Line 9 towards Huangtianba (Jitouqiao)
B3	Island platform, doors open on the left
B3	Southbound	Line 9 towards Financial City East (Cuqiao) →

== Gallery ==
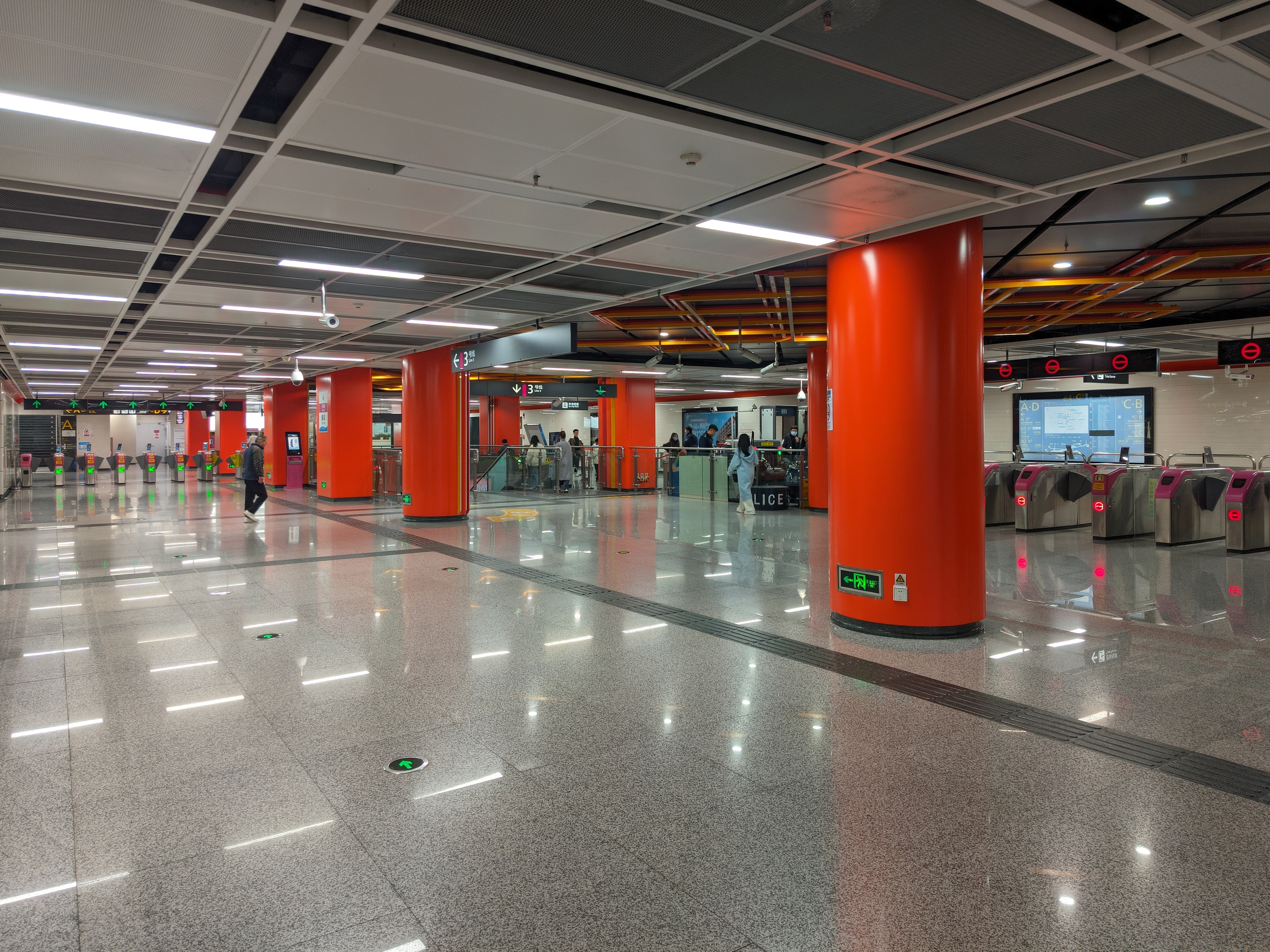
Line 3 concourse

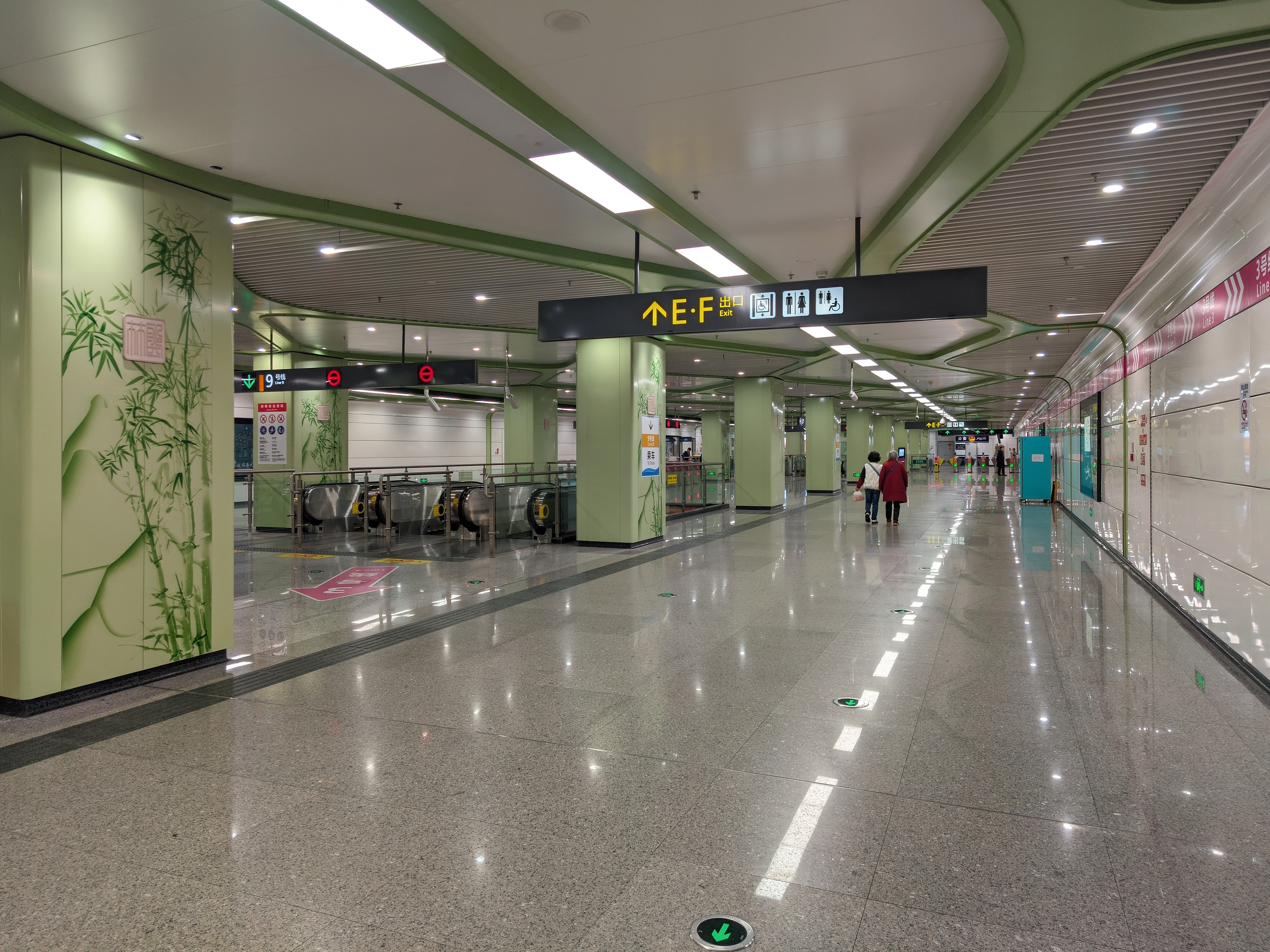
Line 9 concourse

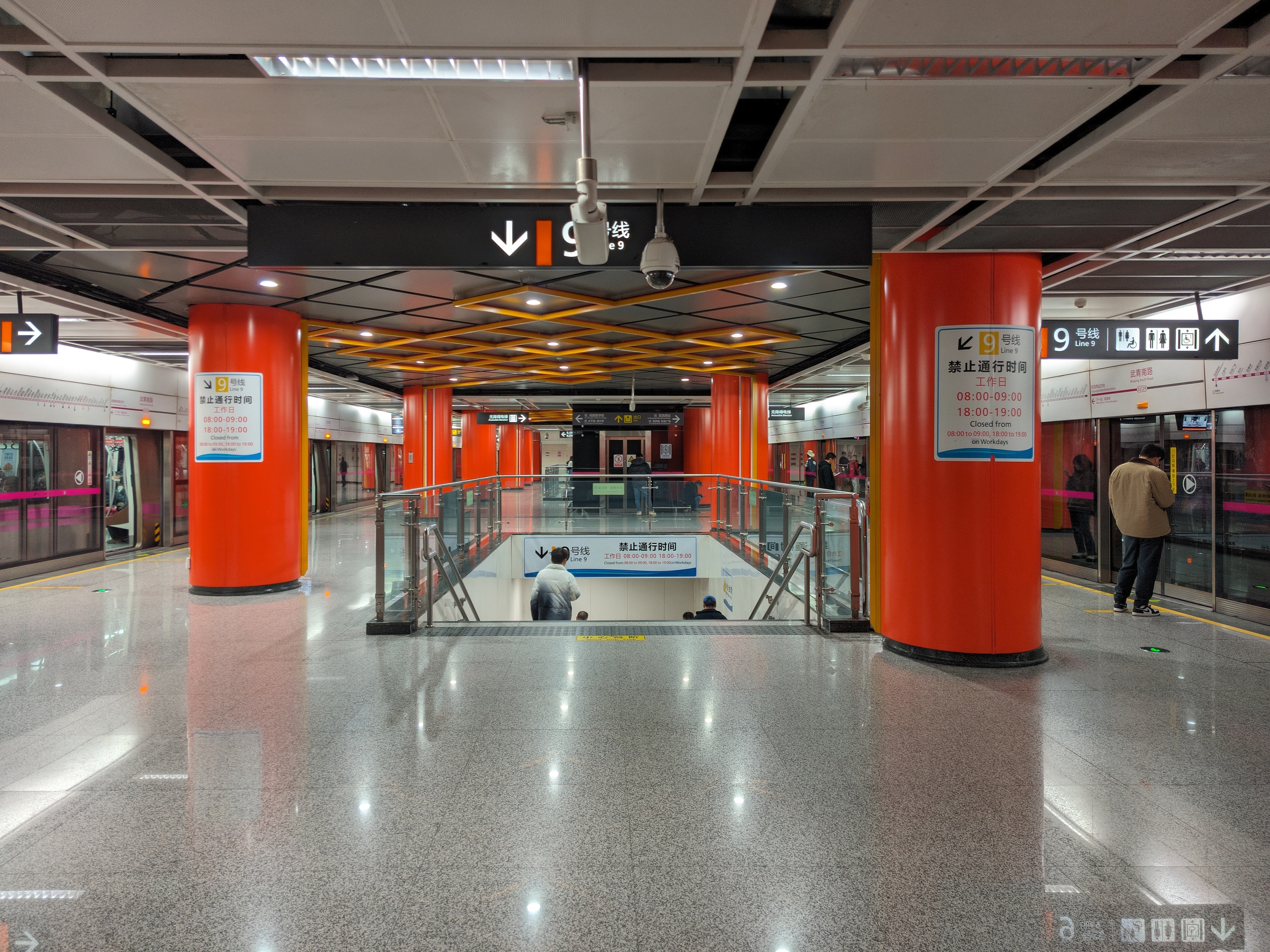
Line 3 platform

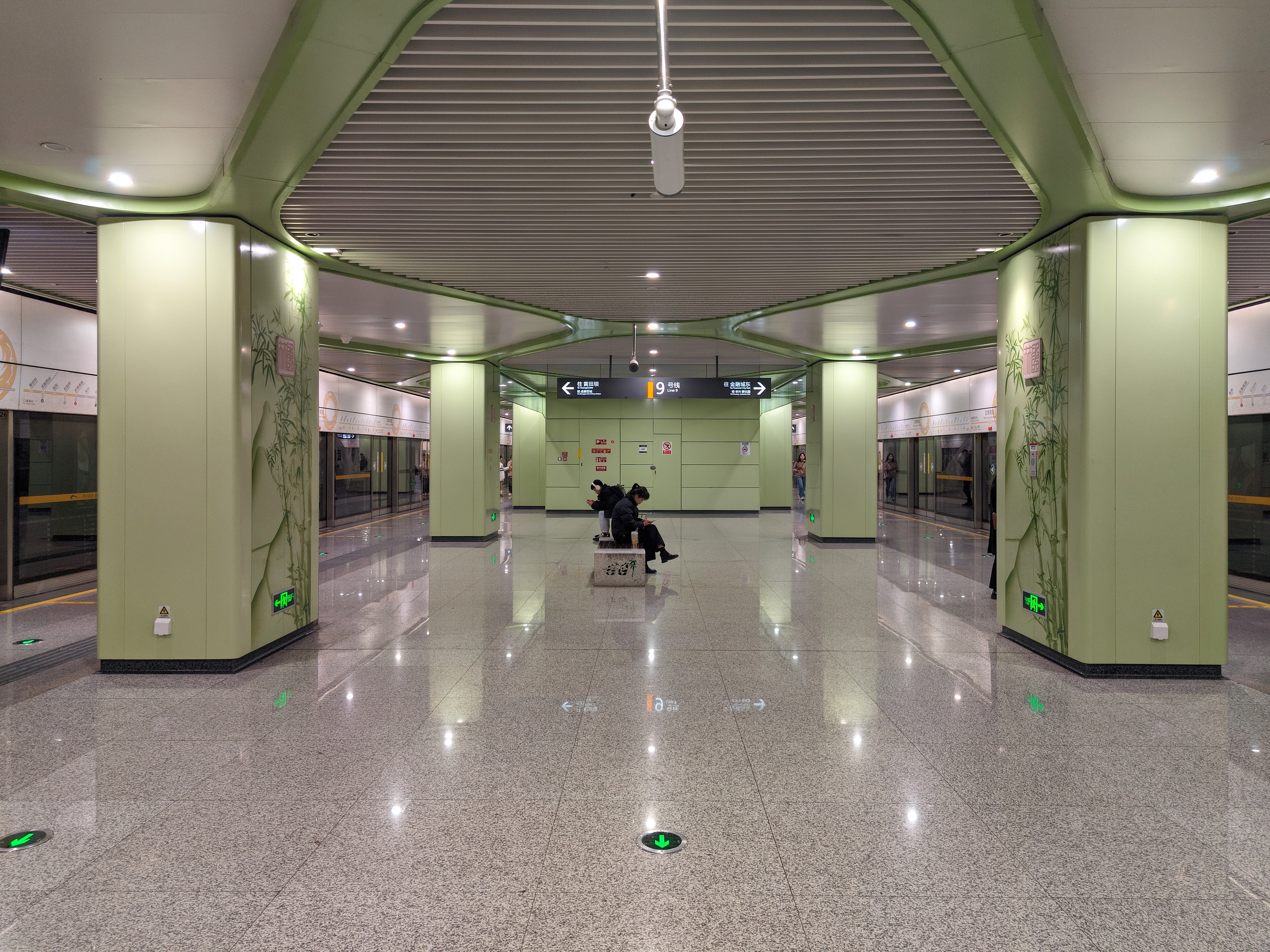
Line 9 platform
