= Chuanzang Flyover station =

Metro station in Chengdu, China

Chuanzang Flyover 川藏立交
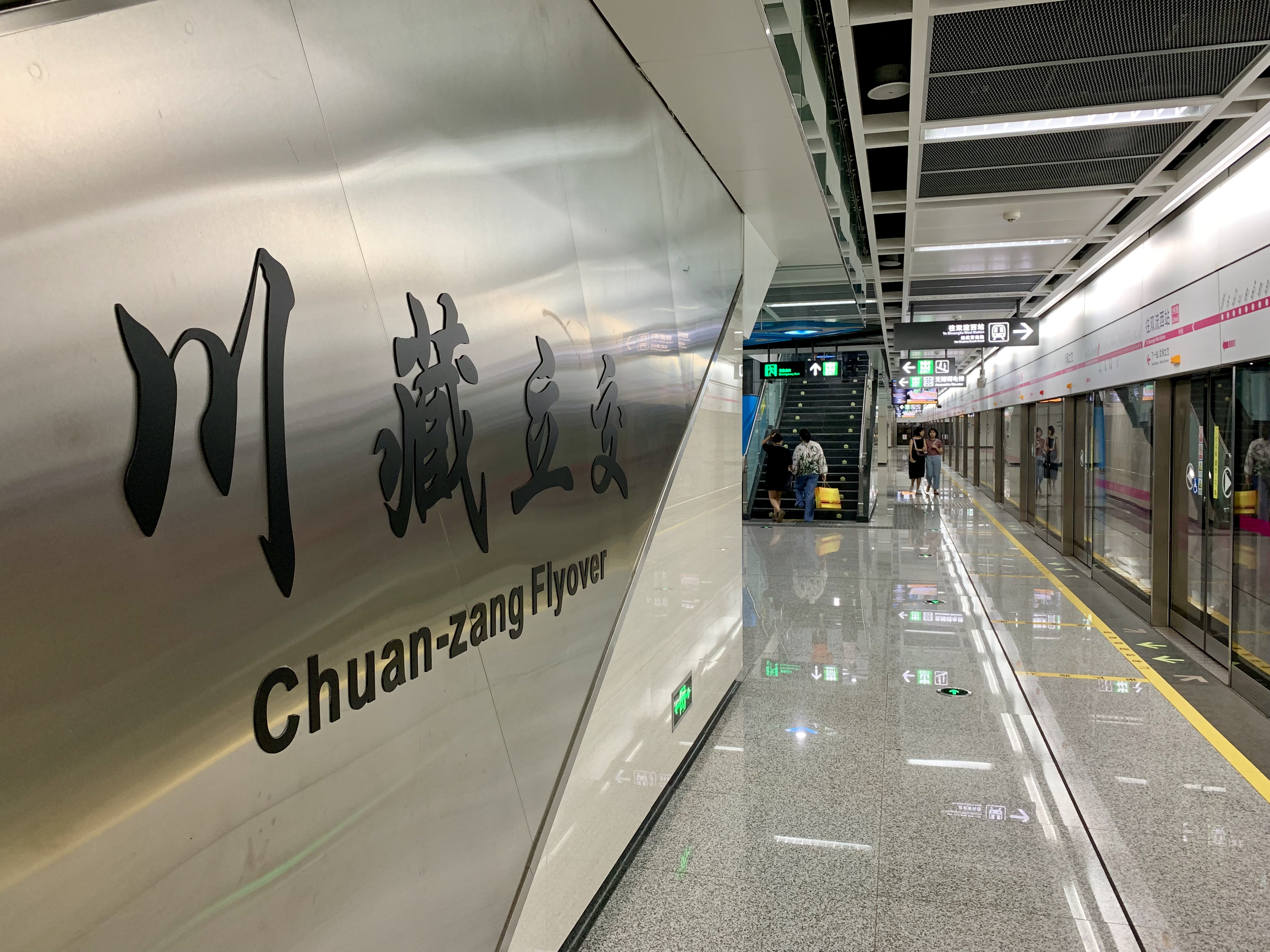

General information
- Location: Wuhou District, Chengdu, Sichuan; China
- Coordinates: 30.62581°N 104.00419°E
- Operated by: Chengdu Metro Limited
- Line(s): Line 3
- Platforms: 2 (1 island platform)

Other information
- Station code: 0327

History
- Opened: 26 December 2018
- Previous names: Chuan-zang Flyover

Services
| Preceding station | Chengdu Metro | Following station |
|---|---|---|
| Taipingyuan towards Chengdu Medical College | Line 3 | Wuhou Flyover towards Shuangliu West Railway Station |

Chuanzang Flyover (Chinese: 川藏立交), formerly known as Chuan-zang Flyover, is a station on Line 3 of the Chengdu Metro in China.

== Station layout ==
| G | Entrances and Exits | Exits A, B, D |
| B1 | Concourse | Faregates, Station Agent |
| B2 | Northbound | ← Line 3 towards Chengdu Medical College (Taipingyuan) |
| B2 | Island platform, doors open on the left |
| B2 | Southbound | Line 3 towards Shuangliu West Railway Station (Wuhou Flyover) → |

== Gallery ==
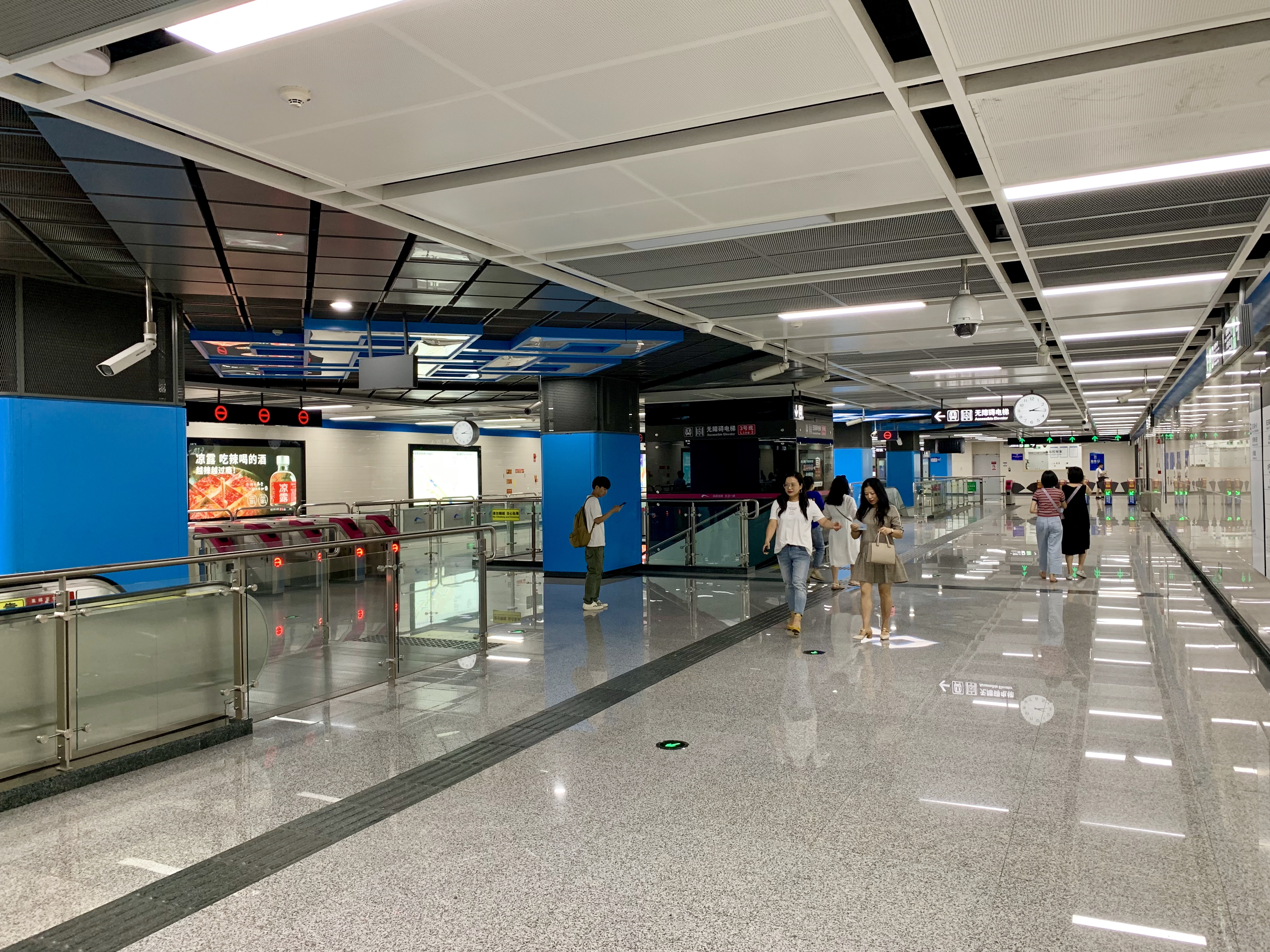
Concourse

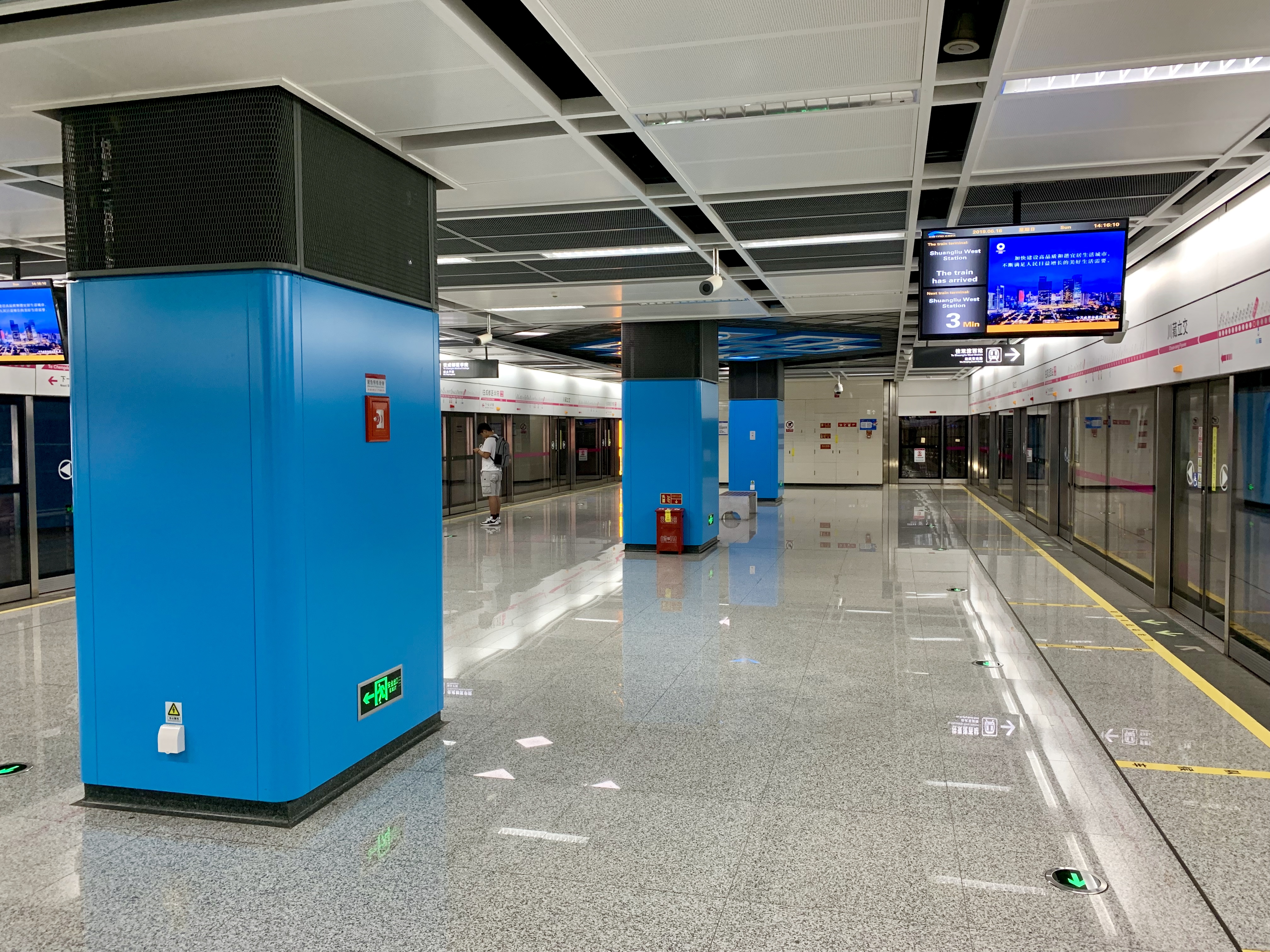
Platform
