= Happy Valley Chengdu =

Theme park in Chengdu, Sichuan, China

- Interactive map of Happy Valley Chengdu
- Location: Chengdu, Sichuan, China
- Coordinates: 30.723521°N 104.032824°E
- Status: Operating
- Opened: January 17, 2009

Attractions
- Roller coasters: 6
- Website: www.happyvalley.cn

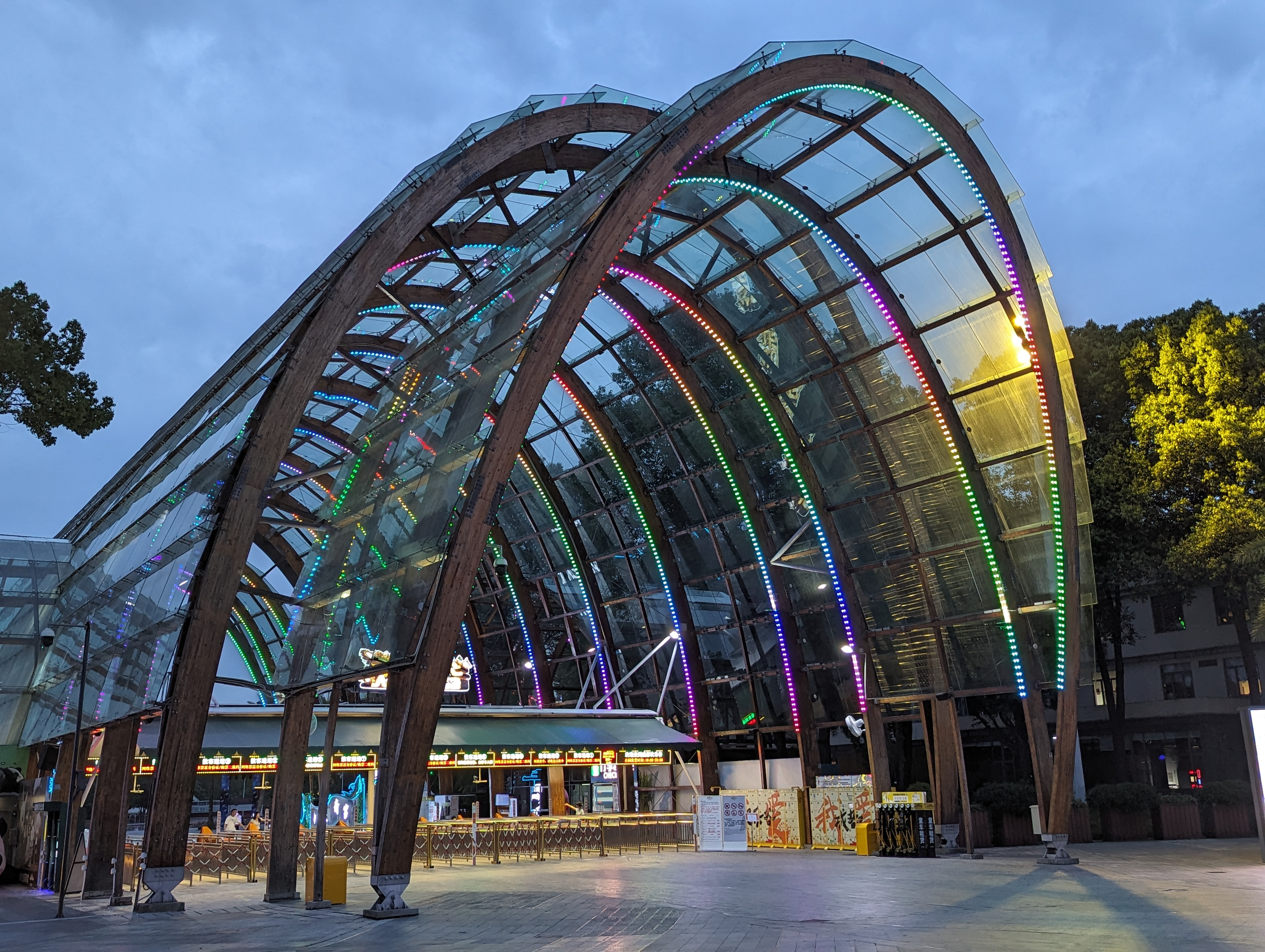
Park entrance

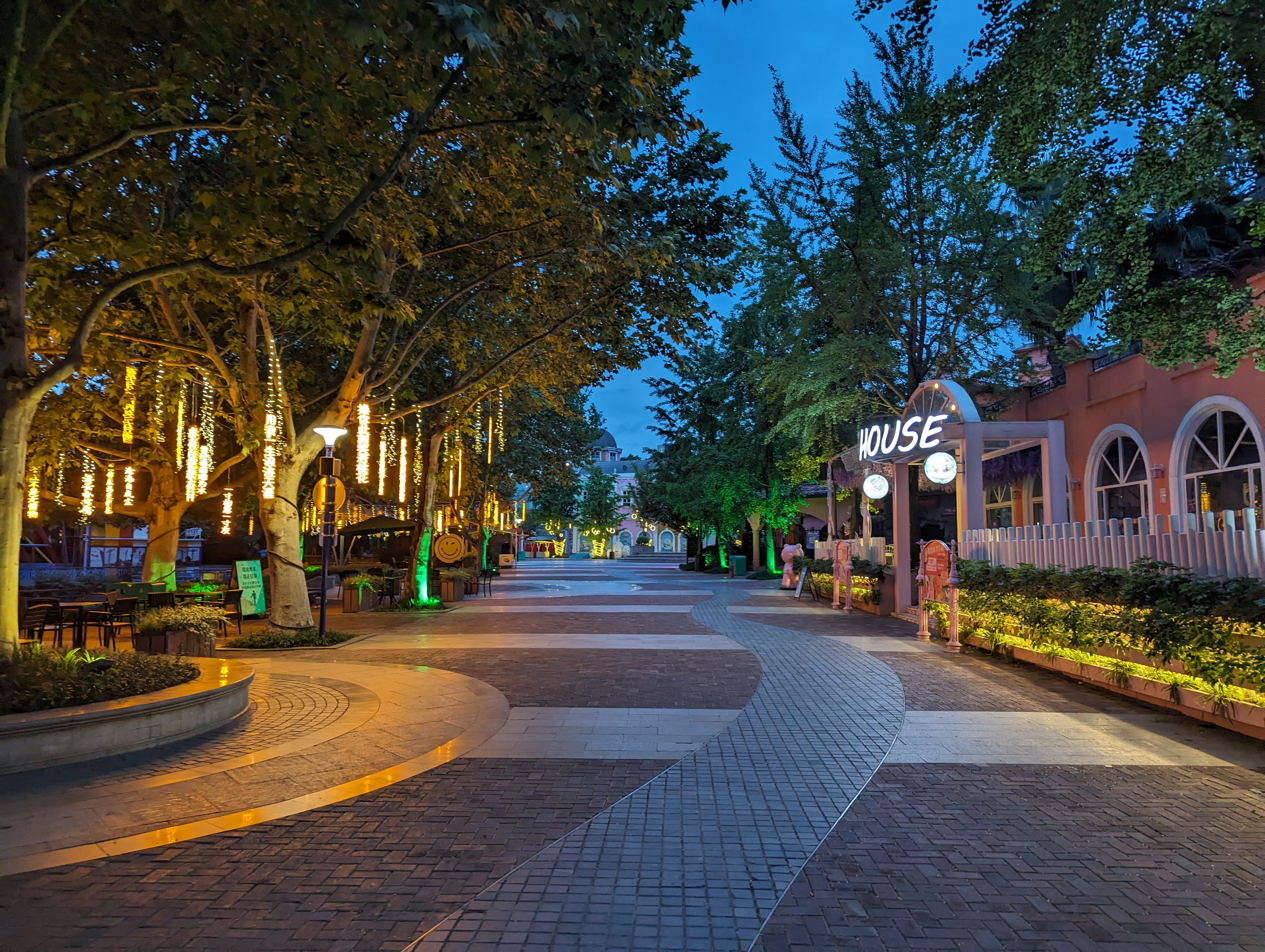
Dream of Mediterranean at Happy Valley Chengdu

Happy Valley Chengdu (simplified Chinese: 成都欢乐谷; traditional Chinese: 成都歡樂谷; pinyin: Chéngdū Huānlè Gǔ) is a theme park in Jinniu District, Chengdu, Sichuan Province, China. Opened on 17 January 2009, it is the third installation of the Happy Valley theme park chain.

== Notable rides ==
Name	Type	Manufacturer	Model	Opened	Other statistics
Dragon in Clouds	Steel – Inverted	Vekoma	Suspended Looping Coaster (Shenlin w/Helix)	19 January 2009	Length: 2,454.1 ft (748.0 m); Height: 117.8 ft (35.9 m); Drop: 111.8 ft (34.1 m); Inversions: 4; Speed: 53.7 mph (86.4 km/h); Duration: 1:32
Dragon in Snowfield	Steel – Mine Train	Vekoma	Mine Train	17 January 2009	Length: 2,575.5 ft (785.0 m); Height: 45.9 ft (14.0 m); Speed: 30.1 mph (48.4 km/h); Duration: 2:20; G-Force: 2.2
Flying Apsaras in Western Region	Steel – Dive	Bolliger & Mabillard	Dive Coaster	10 February 2017	Height: 164 ft (50 m)
Fly Over Mediterranean	Steel	Intamin	Mega-Lite	17 January 2009	Length: 2,477 ft (755 m); Height: 101.7 ft (31.0 m); Drop: 98.4 ft (30.0 m); Speed: 52.8 mph (85.0 km/h)
Great Desert-Rally	Wood	Great Coasters International	Wood Coaster	8 August 2017	Length: 3,280.8 ft (1,000.0 m); Height: 100 ft (30 m)
Magic Carpet; Formerly Mad Rats	Steel – Spinning – Wild Mouse	Jinma Rides; Formerly Golden Horse	Spinning Coaster (ZXC-24A)	17 January 2009	Unknown

Happy Valley Chengdu gallery
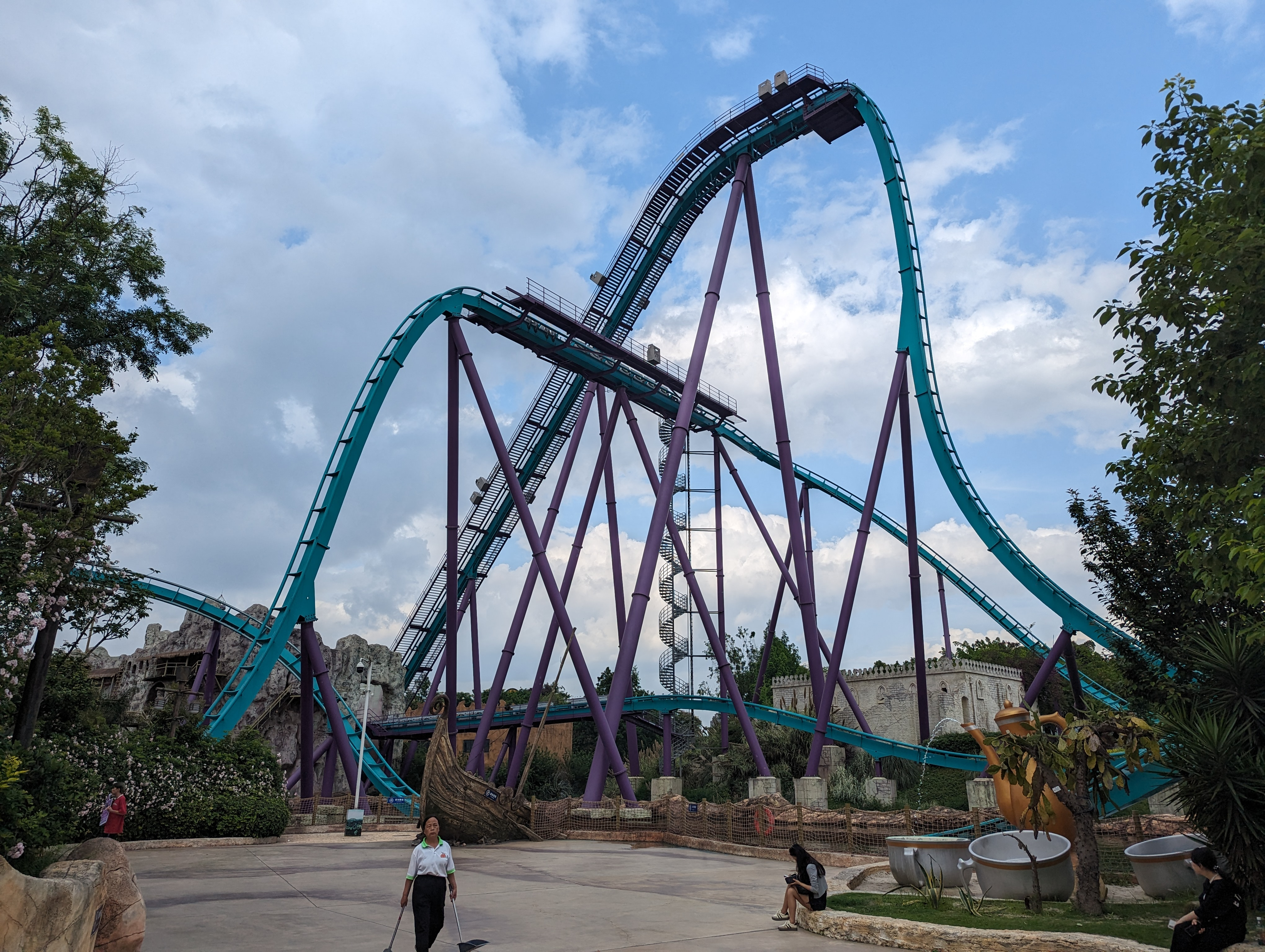
Flying Apsaras

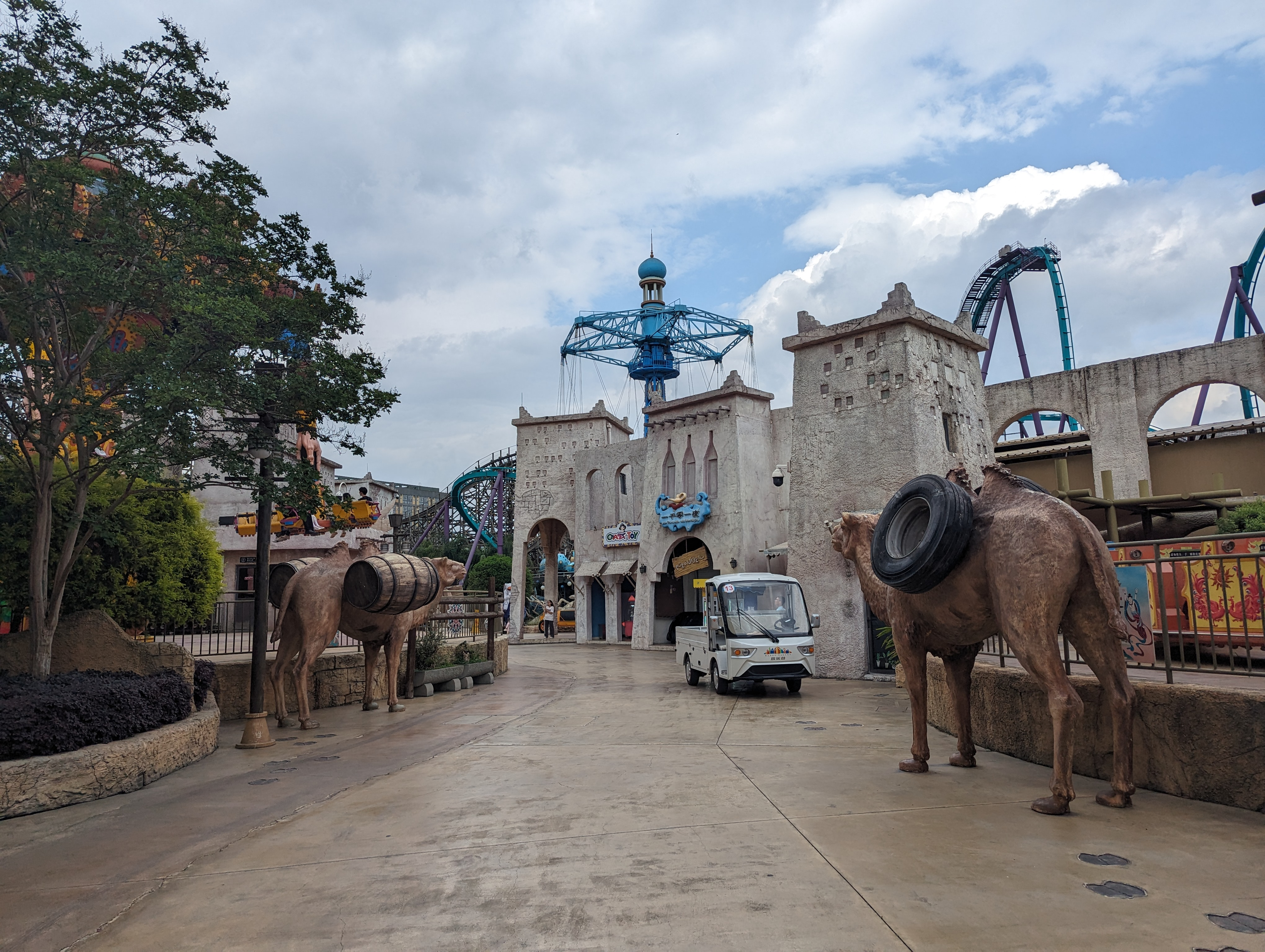
Silk Road Odyssey

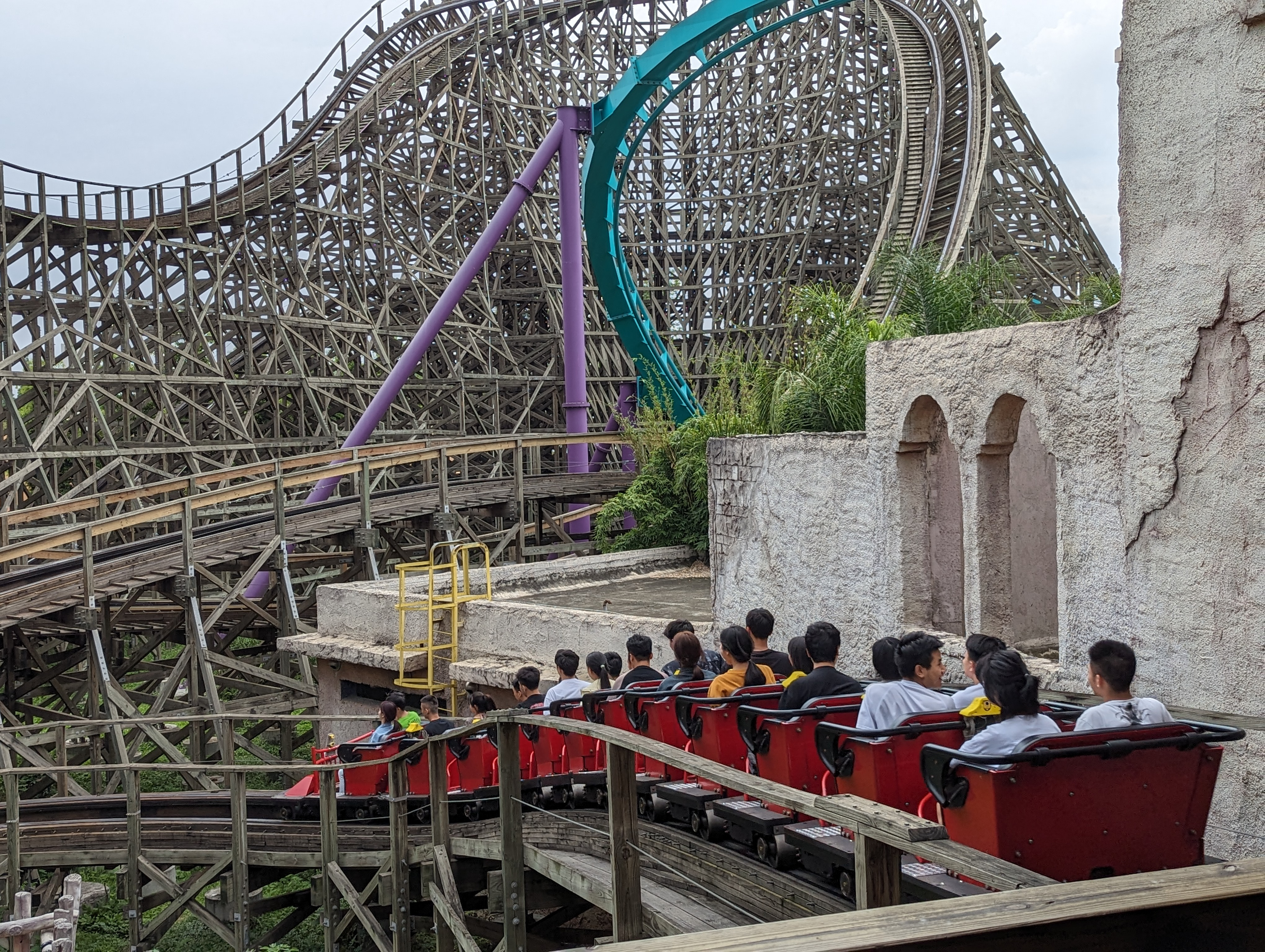
Great Desert Rally

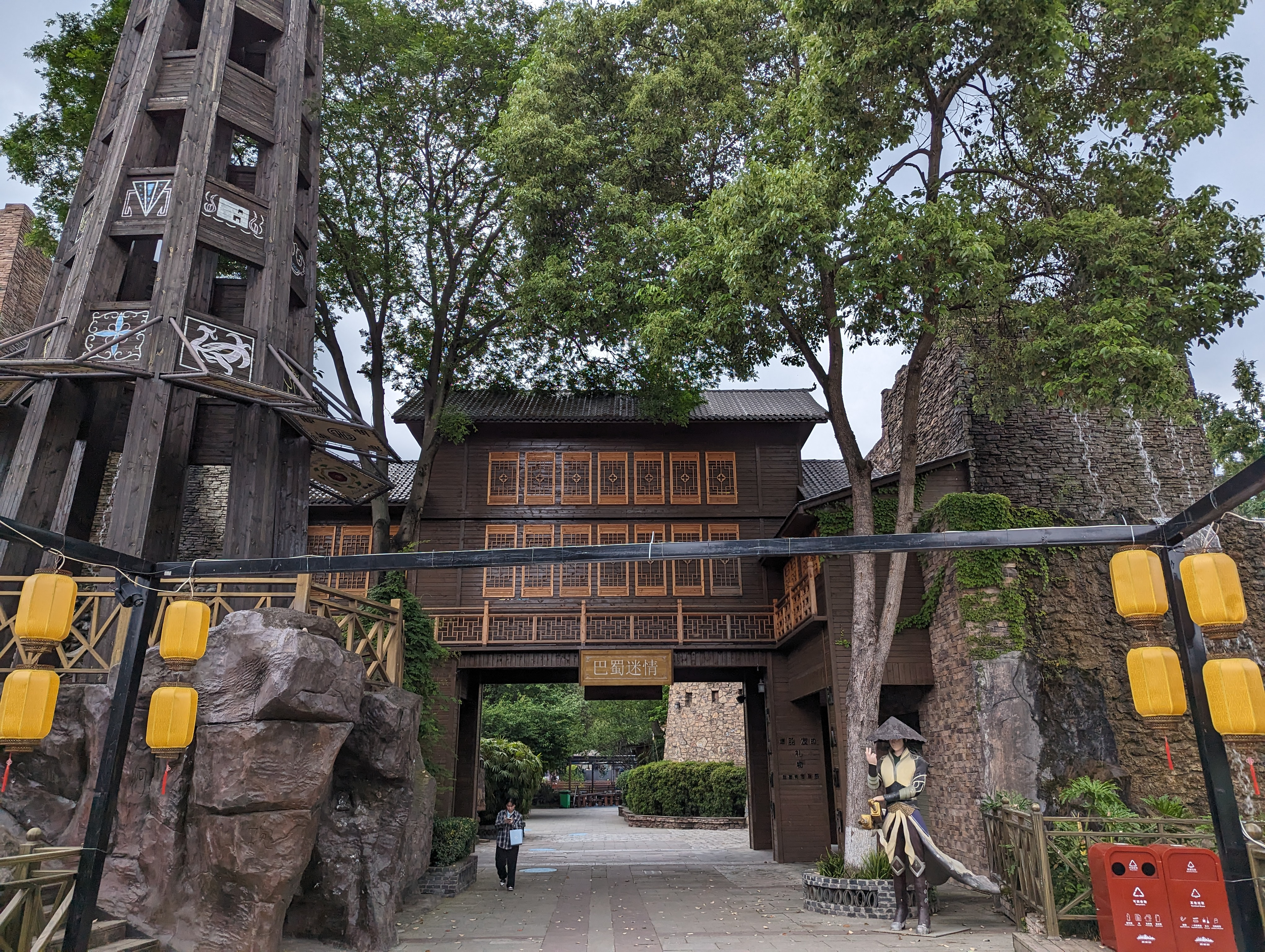
Great Szechwan

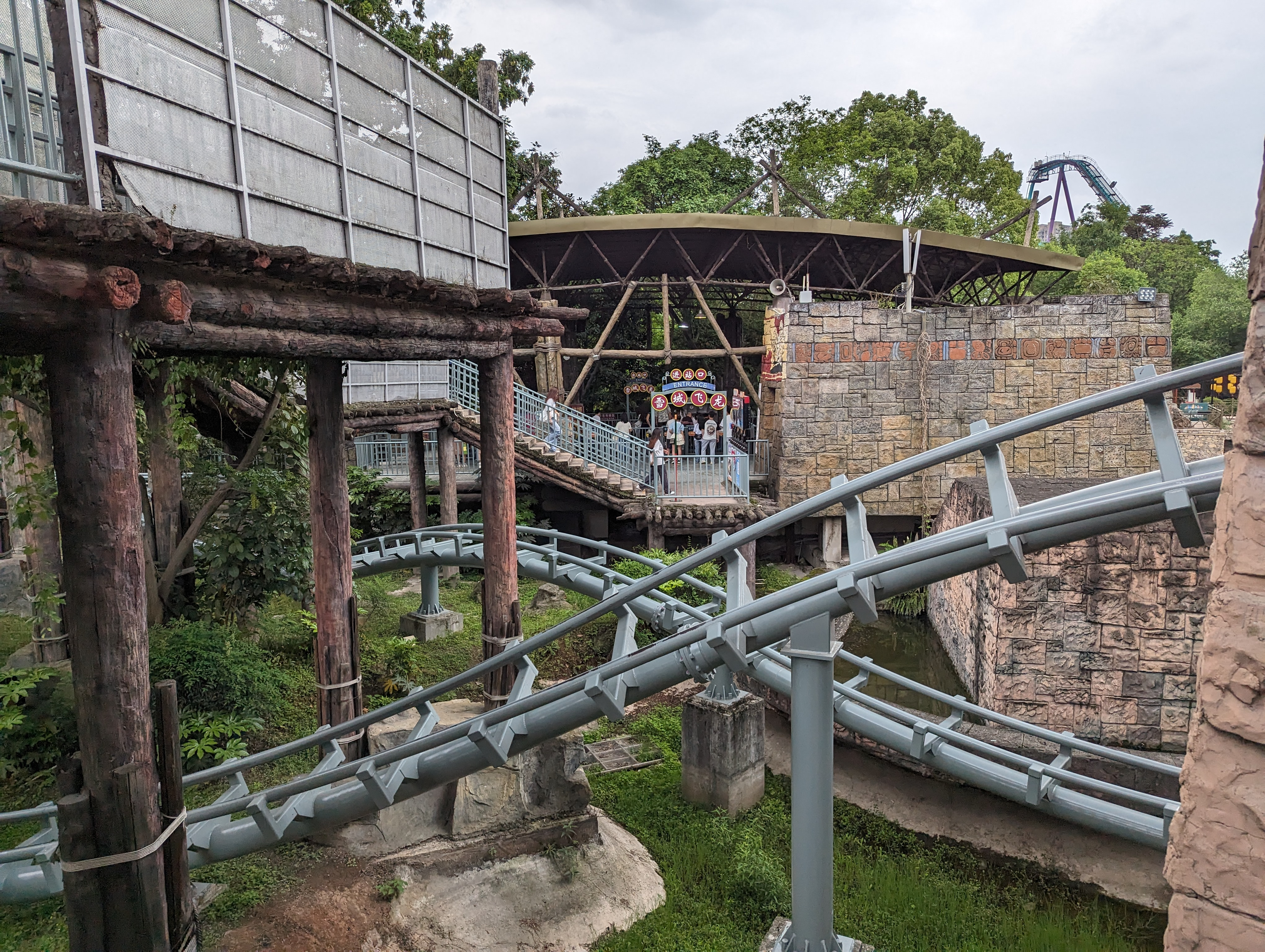
Dragon in Snowfield

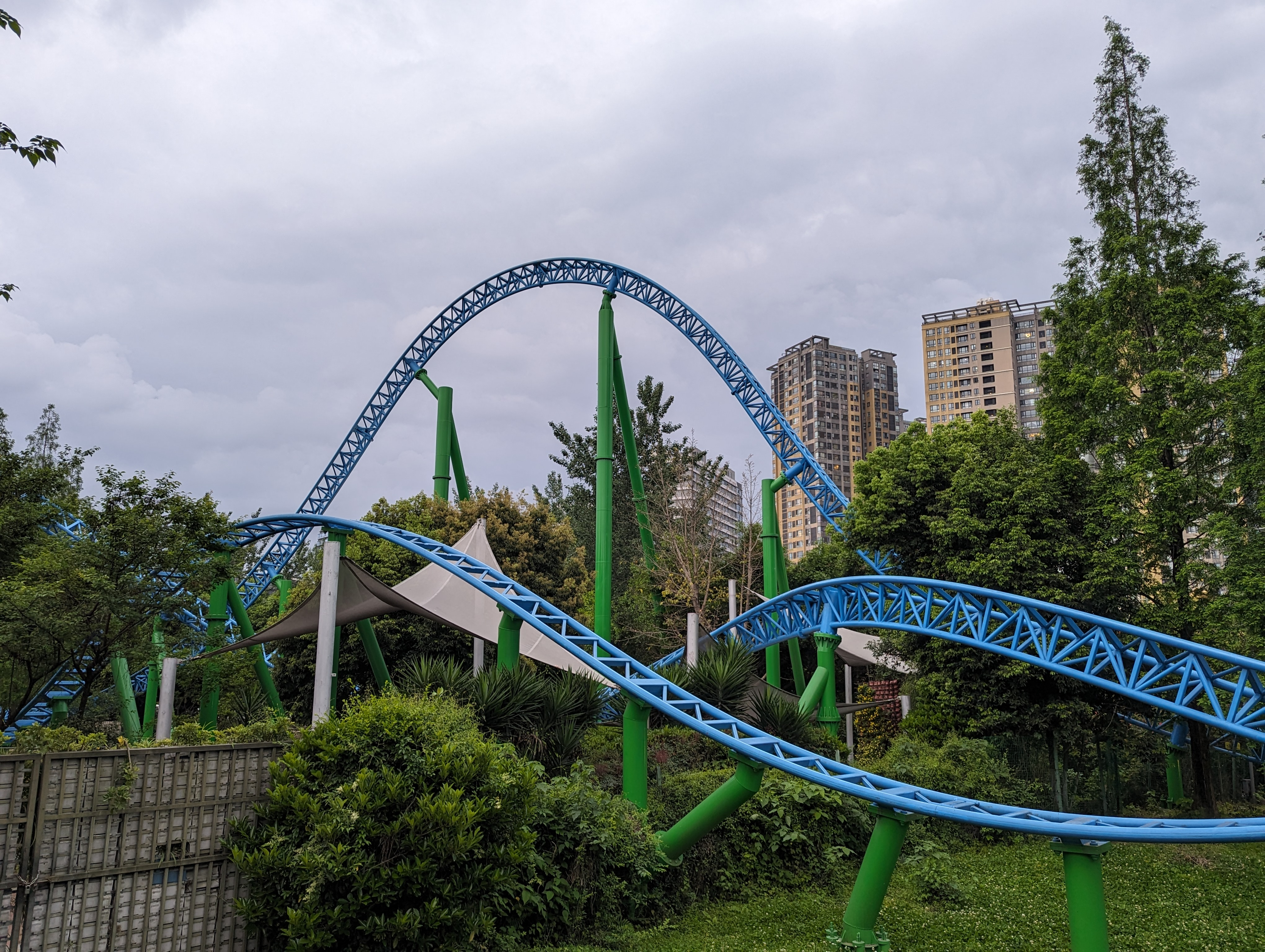
Fly Over Mediterranean

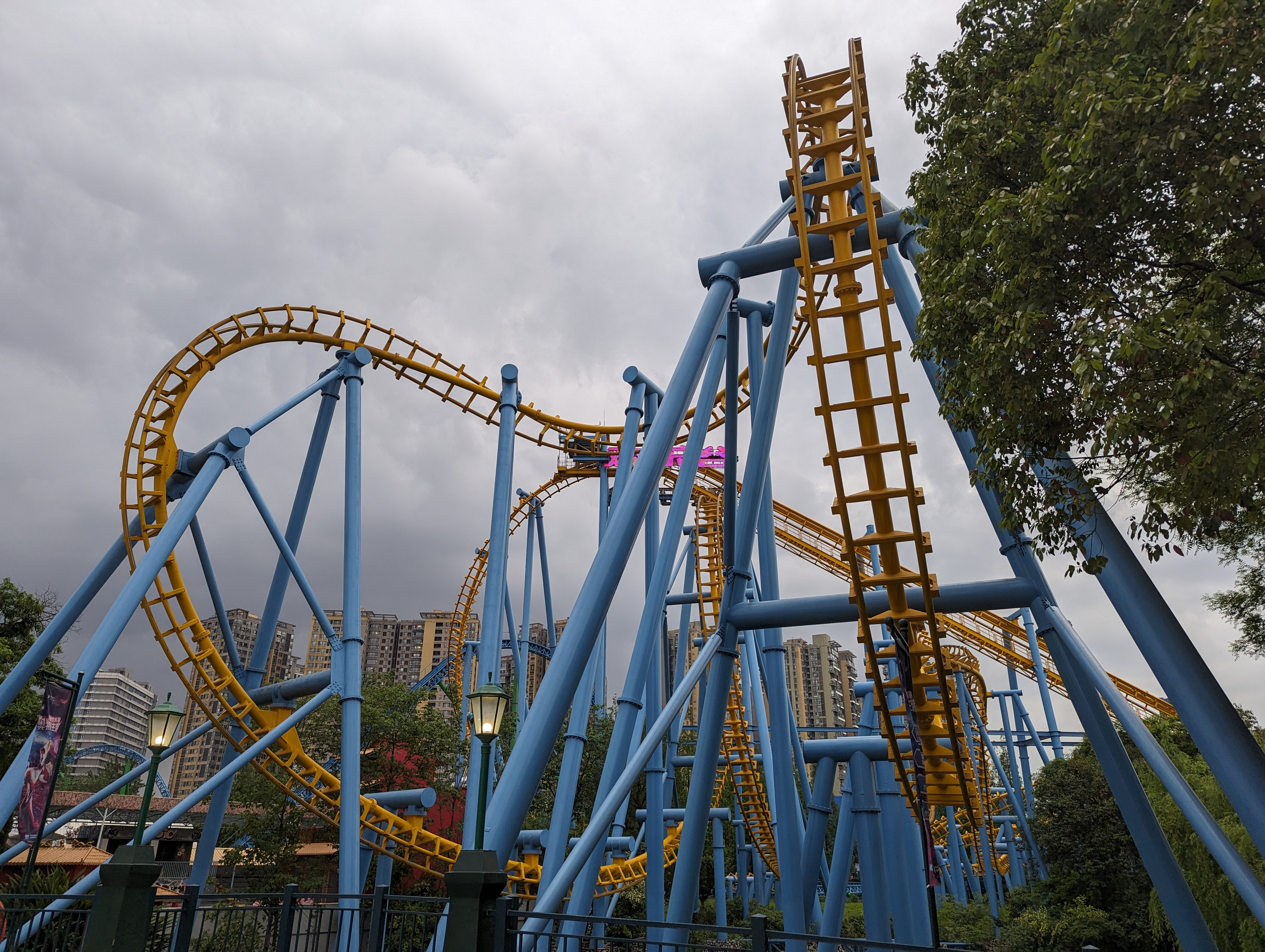
Dragon in Clouds

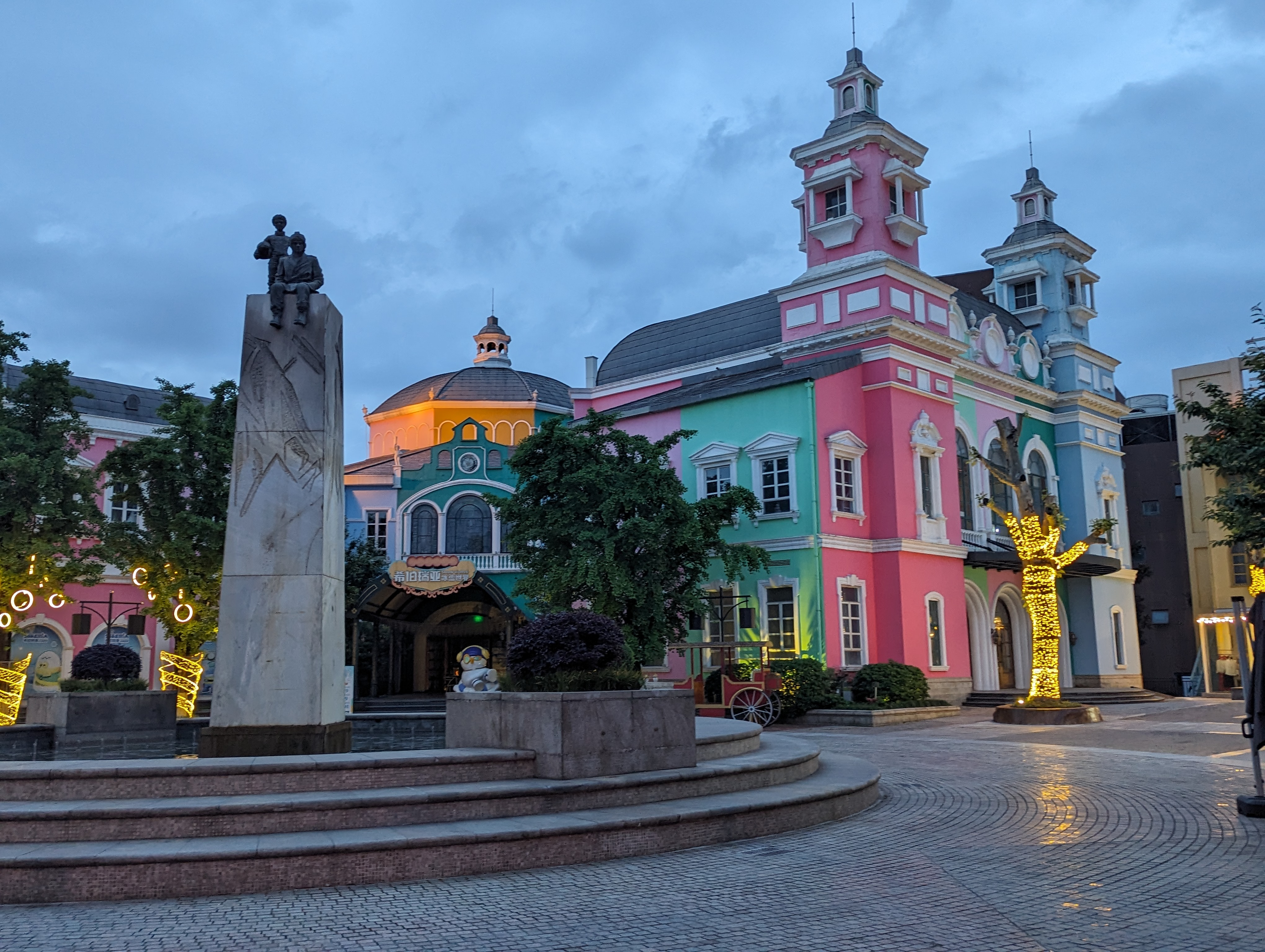
Dream of Mediterranean

== Transportation ==
Happy Valley Chengdu is adjacent to the Xihua Avenue station on Line 6 of Chengdu Metro.
