= Xinghe station =

Metro station in Chengdu, China

Xinghe 星河
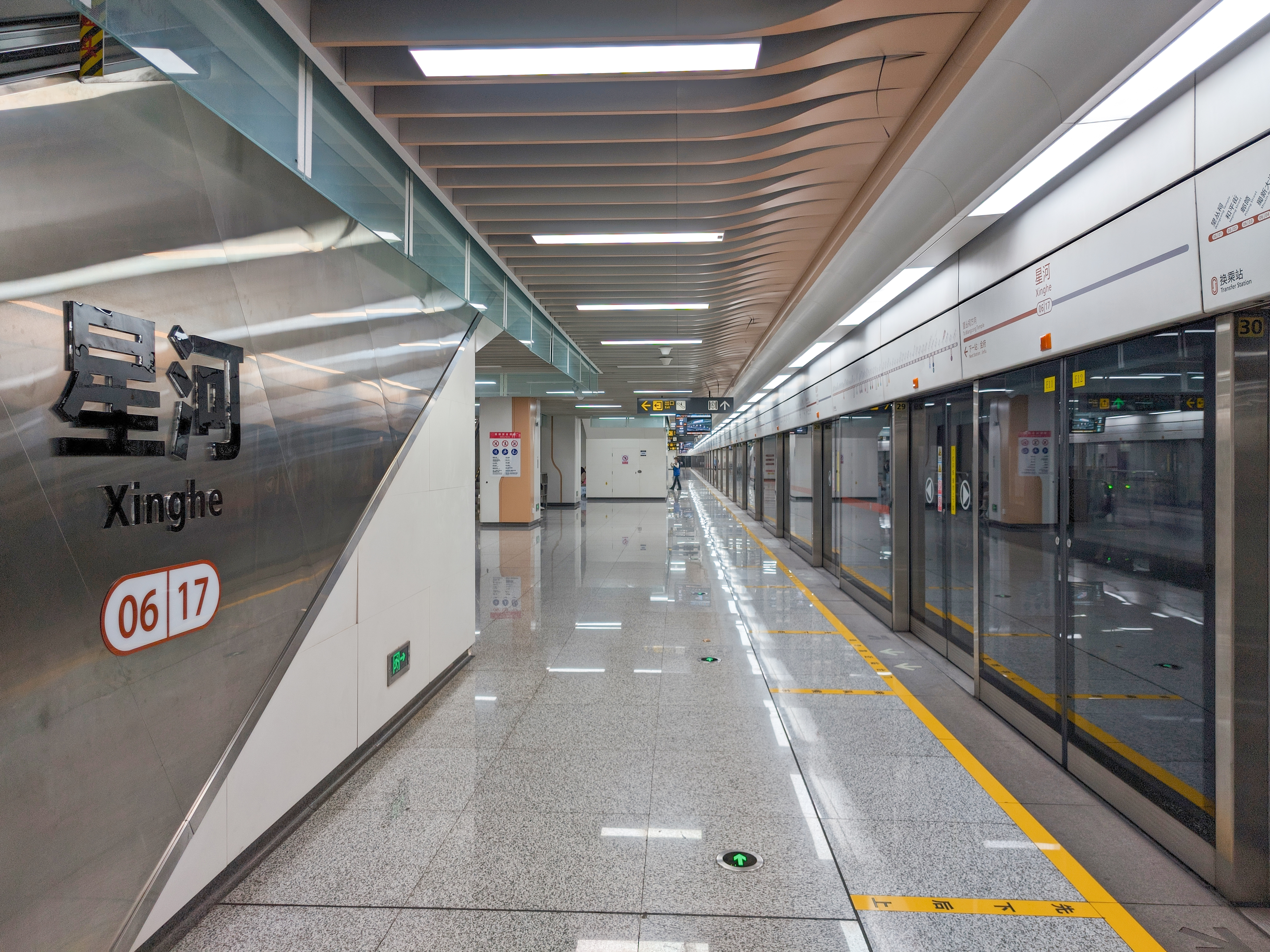

General information
- Location: Jinniu District, Chengdu, Sichuan; China
- Coordinates: 30.70432°N 104.04201°E
- Operator: Chengdu Metro Limited
- Line: Line 6
- Platforms: 2 (1 island platform)

Other information
- Station code: 0617

History
- Opened: 18 December 2020

Services
Preceding station	Chengdu Metro	Following station
Jinfu towards Wangcong Temple	Line 6	Southwest Jiaotong University towards Lanjiagou
Location

Xinghe is a metro station in Chengdu, Sichuan, China. It opened on 18 December 2020 with the opening of Chengdu Metro Line 6.
