= Jinfu station =

Metro station in Chengdu, China

Jinfu 金府
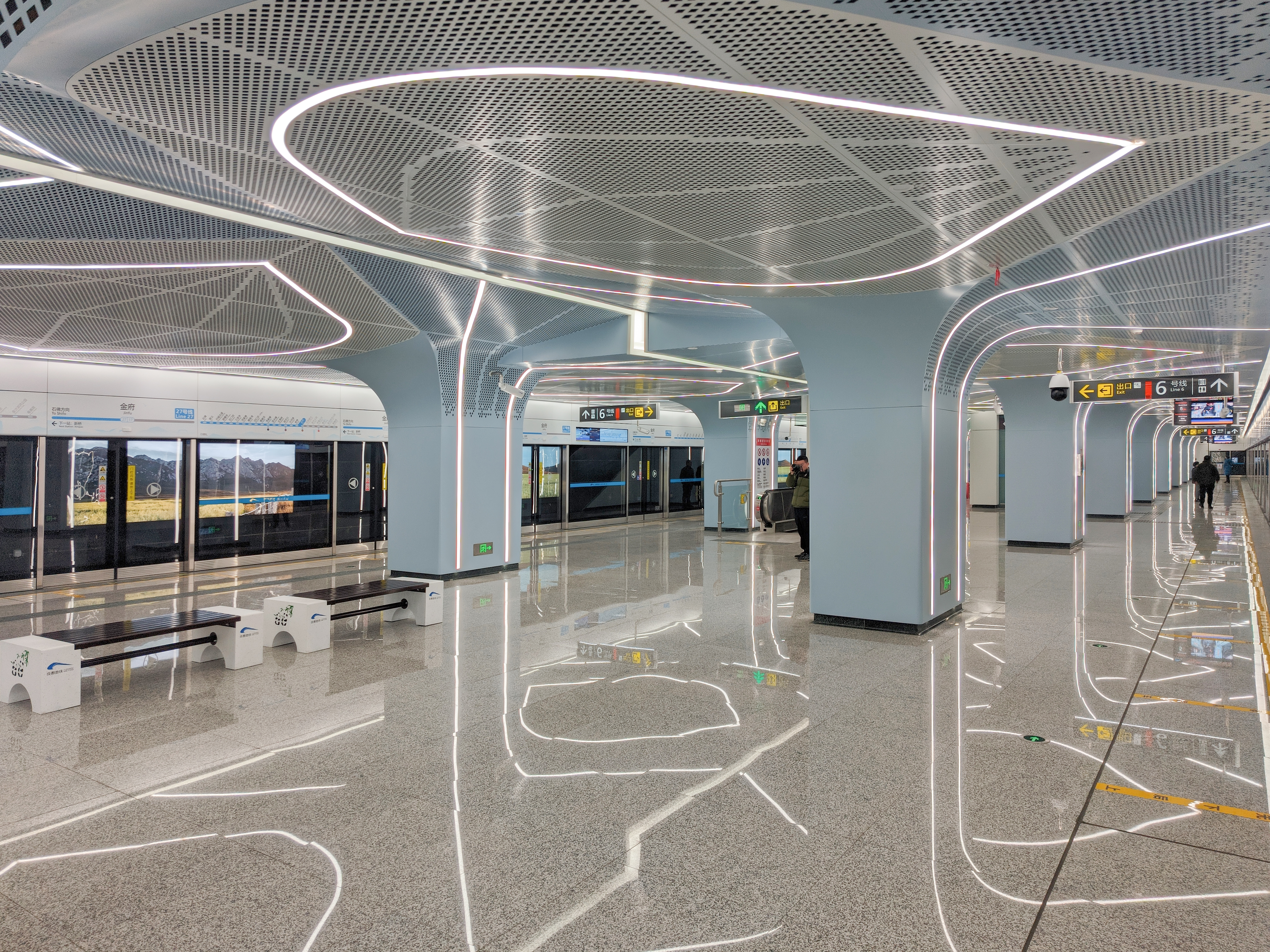
- Line 27 platform

General information
- Location: Jinniu District, Chengdu, Sichuan; China
- Operator: Chengdu Metro Limited
- Lines: Line 6 Line 27
- Platforms: 4 (2 island platforms)

Other information
- Station code: 0616 2717

History
- Opened: 18 December 2020 (Line 6); 19 December 2024 (Line 27)

Services
Preceding station	Chengdu Metro	Following station
Xihua Avenue towards Wangcong Temple	Line 6	Xinghe towards Lanjiagou
Xinqiao towards Shifo	Line 27	Huazhaobi North towards Shuxin Road
Location

Jinfu is a metro station of Line 6 and Line 27 of the Chengdu Metro. It was opened on December 18, 2020 with the opening of Chengdu Metro Line 6, and December 19, 2024 with the opening of Chengdu Metro Line 27.
