= Dongzikou station =

Metro station in Chengdu, China

Dongzikou 洞子口
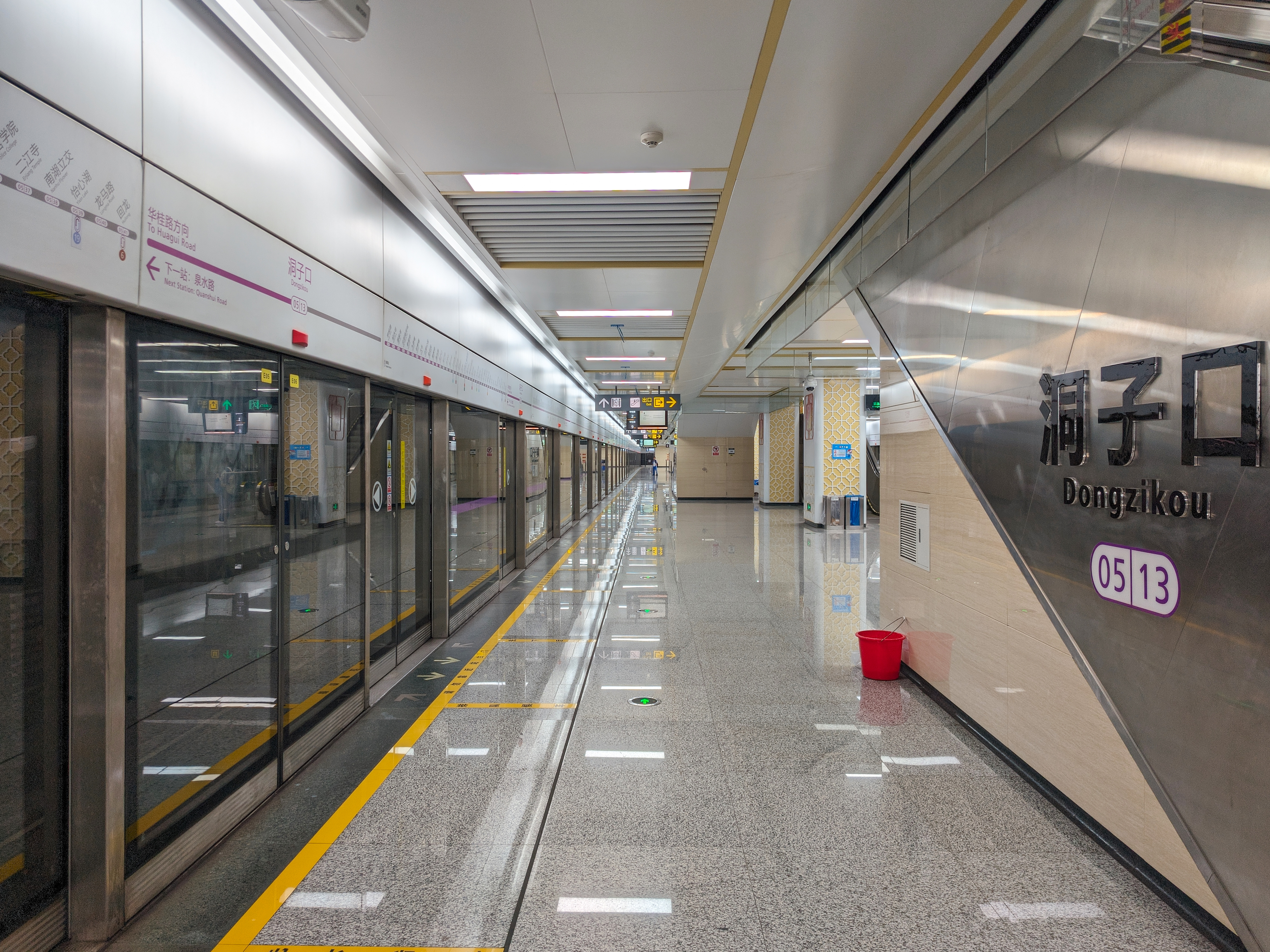
- Line 5 platform

General information
- Location: Jinniu District, Chengdu, Sichuan; China
- Operated by: Chengdu Metro Limited
- Lines: Line 5 Line 27
- Platforms: 4 (2 island platforms)

Other information
- Station code: 0513 2714

History
- Opened: 27 December 2019

Services
| Preceding station | Chengdu Metro | Following station |
|---|---|---|
| Quanshui Road towards Huagui Road | Line 5 | Funing Road towards Huilong |
| Wangjiaqiao towards Shifo | Line 27 | Shaheyuan towards Shuxin Road |
Location

Dongzikou (Chinese: 洞子口) is a station on Line 5 and Line 27 of the Chengdu Metro in China. It was opened on December 27, 2019.
