= Xingsheng station =

Metro station in Chengdu, China

Xingsheng 兴盛
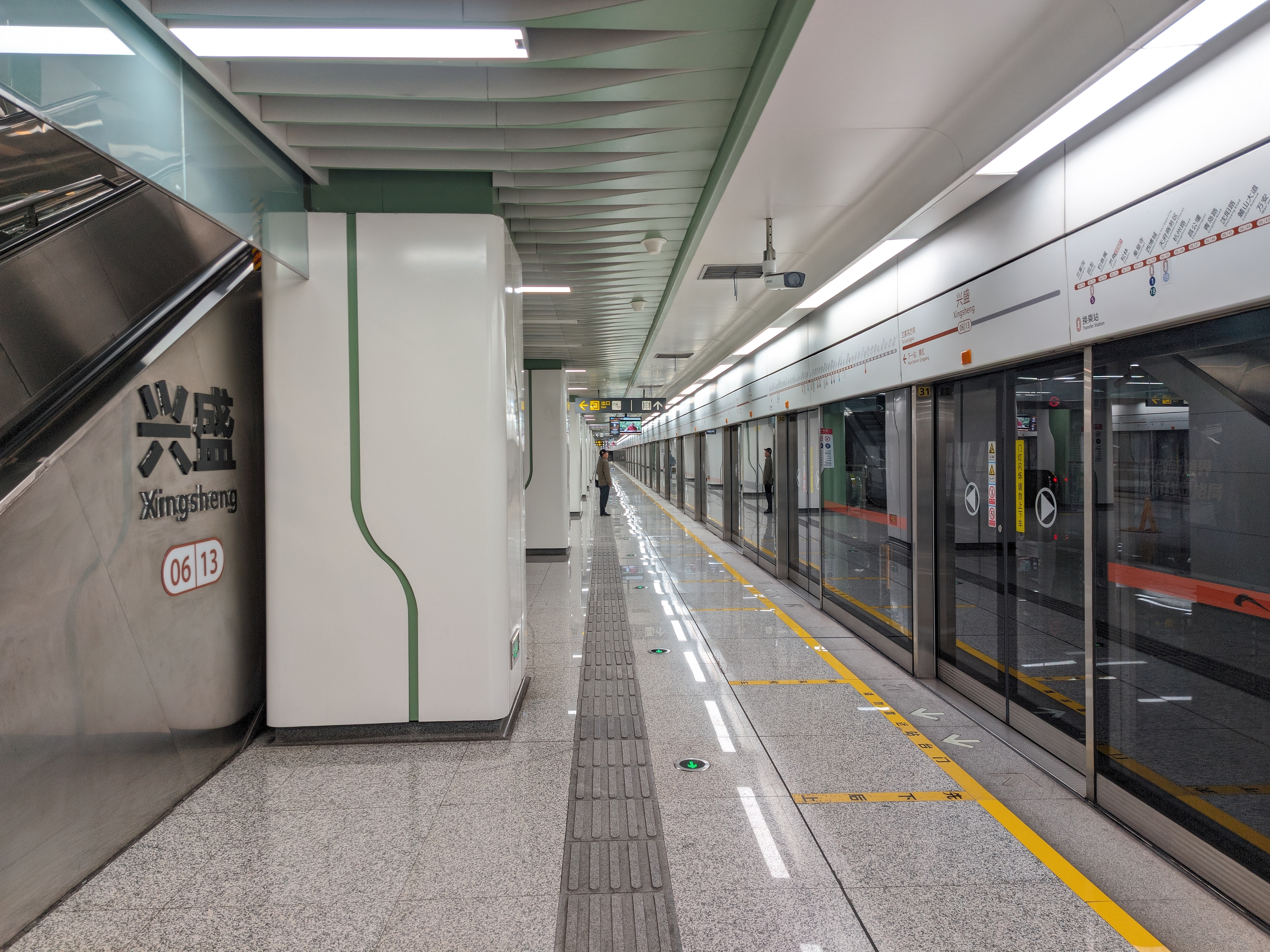

General information
- Location: Jinniu District, Chengdu, Sichuan; China
- Coordinates: 30.73332°N 104.01925°E
- Operated by: Chengdu Metro Limited
- Line(s): Line 6
- Platforms: 2 (1 island platform)

Other information
- Station code: 0613

History
- Opened: 18 December 2020

Services
Preceding station	Chengdu Metro	Following station
Houjiaqiao towards Wangcong Temple	Line 6	Qinggang towards Lanjiagou
Location

Xingsheng is a metro station at Chengdu, Sichuan, China. It opened on December 18, 2020 with the opening of Chengdu Metro Line 6.
