= Funing Road station =

Metro station in Chengdu, China

Funing Road 福宁路
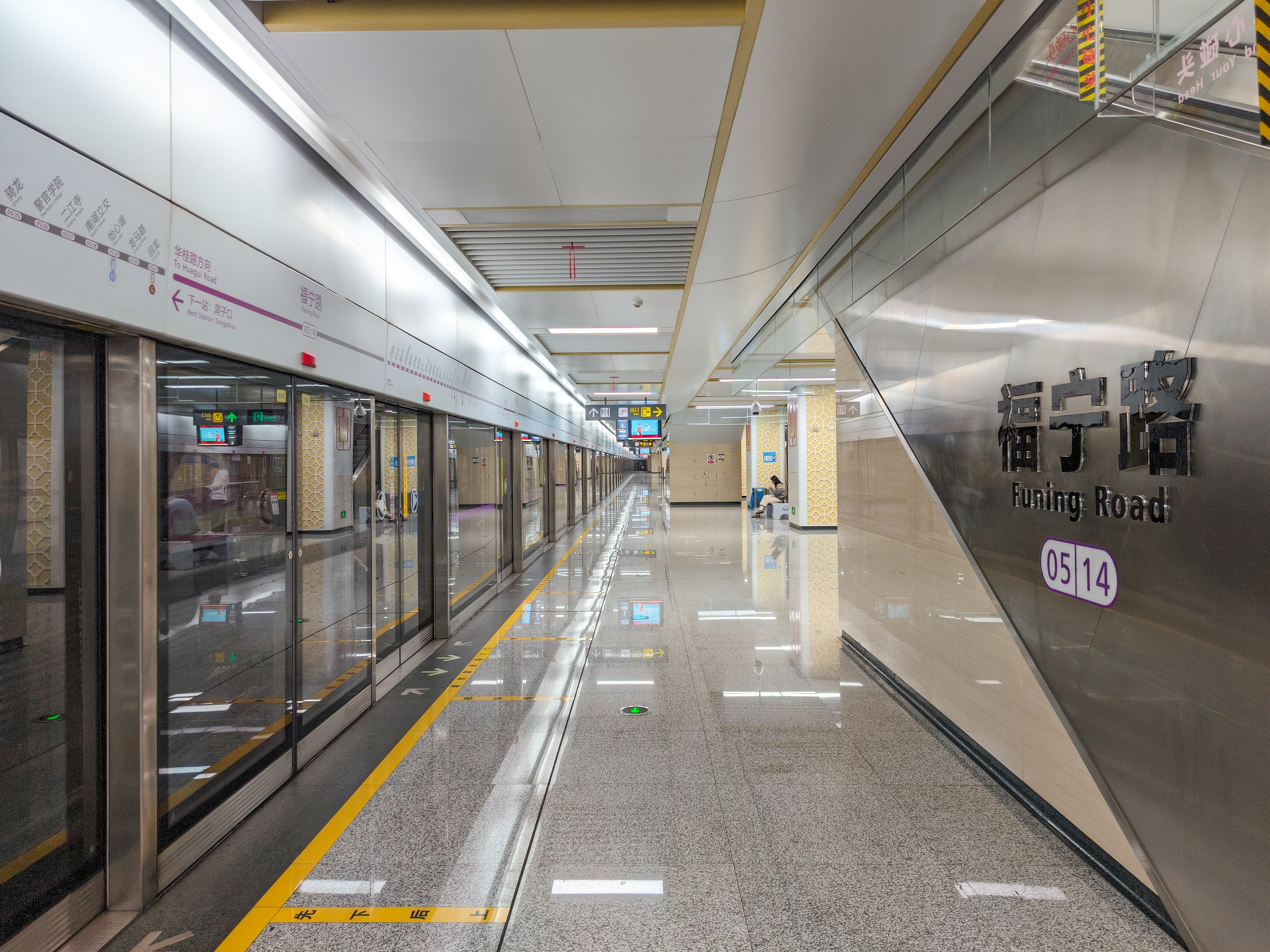

General information
- Location: Jinniu District, Chengdu, Sichuan; China
- Operated by: Chengdu Metro Limited
- Line: Line 5
- Platforms: 2 (1 island platform)

Other information
- Station code: 0514

History
- Opened: 27 December 2019

Services
Preceding station	Chengdu Metro	Following station
Dongzikou towards Huagui Road	Line 5	Wukuaishi towards Huilong
Location

Funing Road (Chinese: 福宁路) is a station on Line 5 of the Chengdu Metro in China. It was opened on 27 December 2019.
