= Shawan station =

Metro station in Chengdu, China

Shawan 沙湾
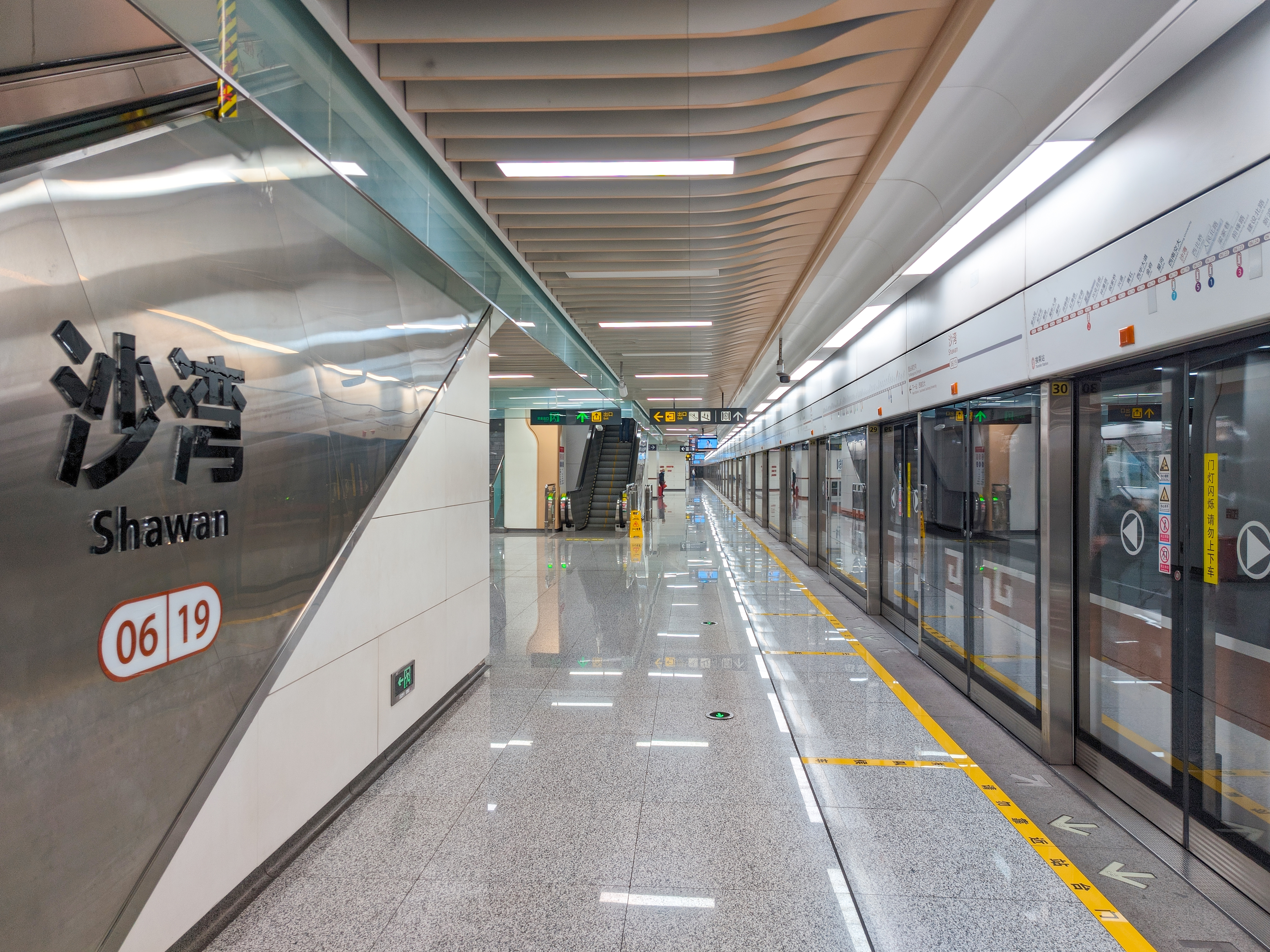

General information
- Location: Jinniu District, Chengdu, Sichuan; China
- Operated by: Chengdu Metro Limited
- Line: Line 6
- Platforms: 2 (1 island platform)

Other information
- Station code: 0619

History
- Opened: 18 December 2020

Services
Preceding station	Chengdu Metro	Following station
Southwest Jiaotong University towards Wangcong Temple	Line 6	Xibei Bridge towards Lanjiagou
Location

Shawan is a metro station at Chengdu, Sichuan, China. It opened on December 18, 2020 with the opening of Chengdu Metro Line 6.
