= Xihua Avenue station =

Metro station in Chengdu, China

Xihua Avenue 西华大道
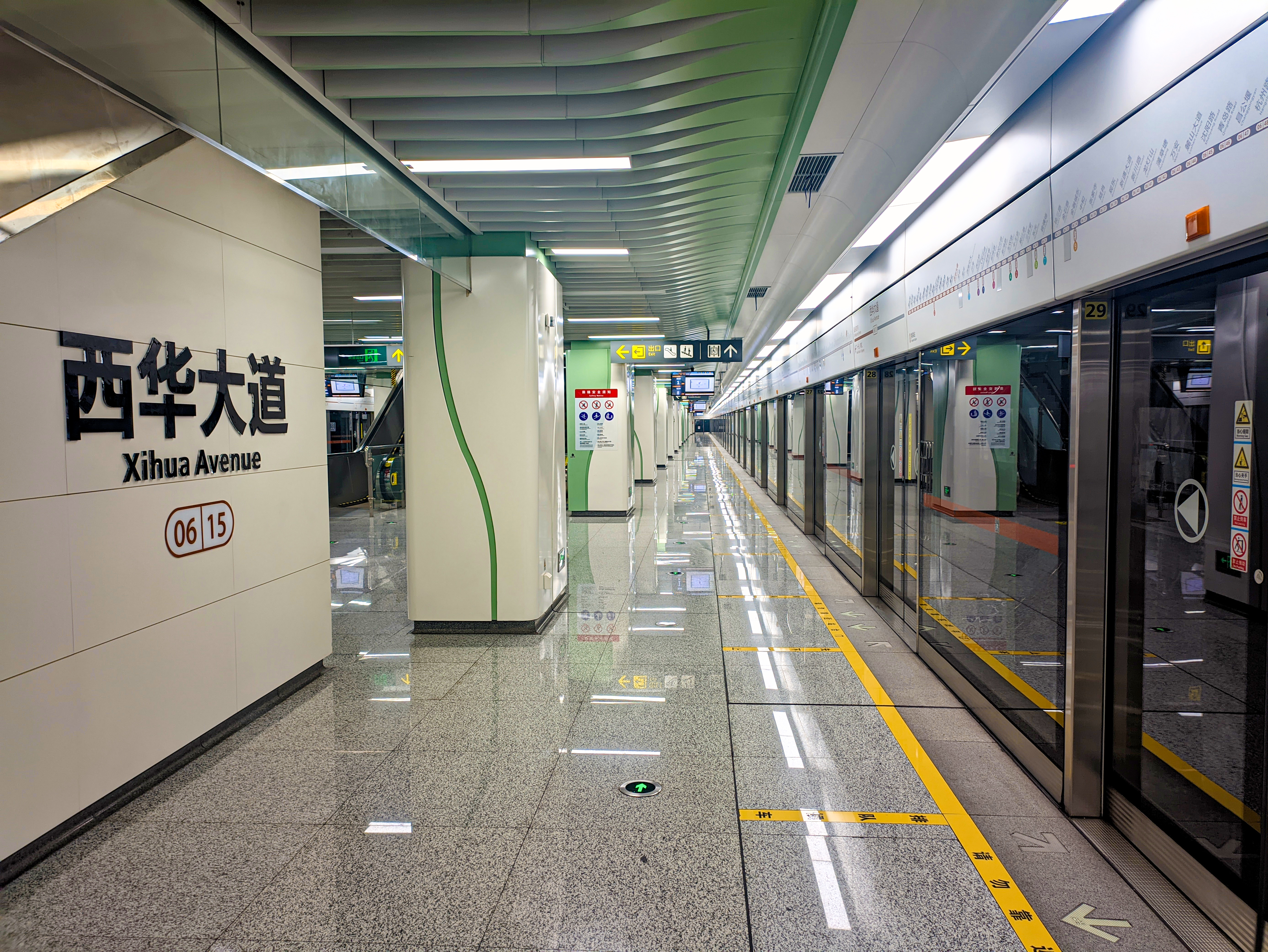

General information
- Location: Jinniu District, Chengdu, Sichuan; China
- Coordinates: 30.72119°N 104.02947°E
- Operated by: Chengdu Metro Limited
- Line(s): Line 6
- Platforms: 2 (1 island platform)

Other information
- Station code: 0615

History
- Opened: 18 December 2020

Services
Preceding station	Chengdu Metro	Following station
Qinggang towards Wangcong Temple	Line 6	Jinfu towards Lanjiagou
Location

Xihua Avenue is a metro station at Chengdu, Sichuan, China. It opened on December 18, 2020, with the opening of Chengdu Metro Line 6. It is located near Happy Valley Chengdu.
