= Southwest Jiaotong University station =

Chengdu Metro station

Southwest Jiaotong University 西南交大
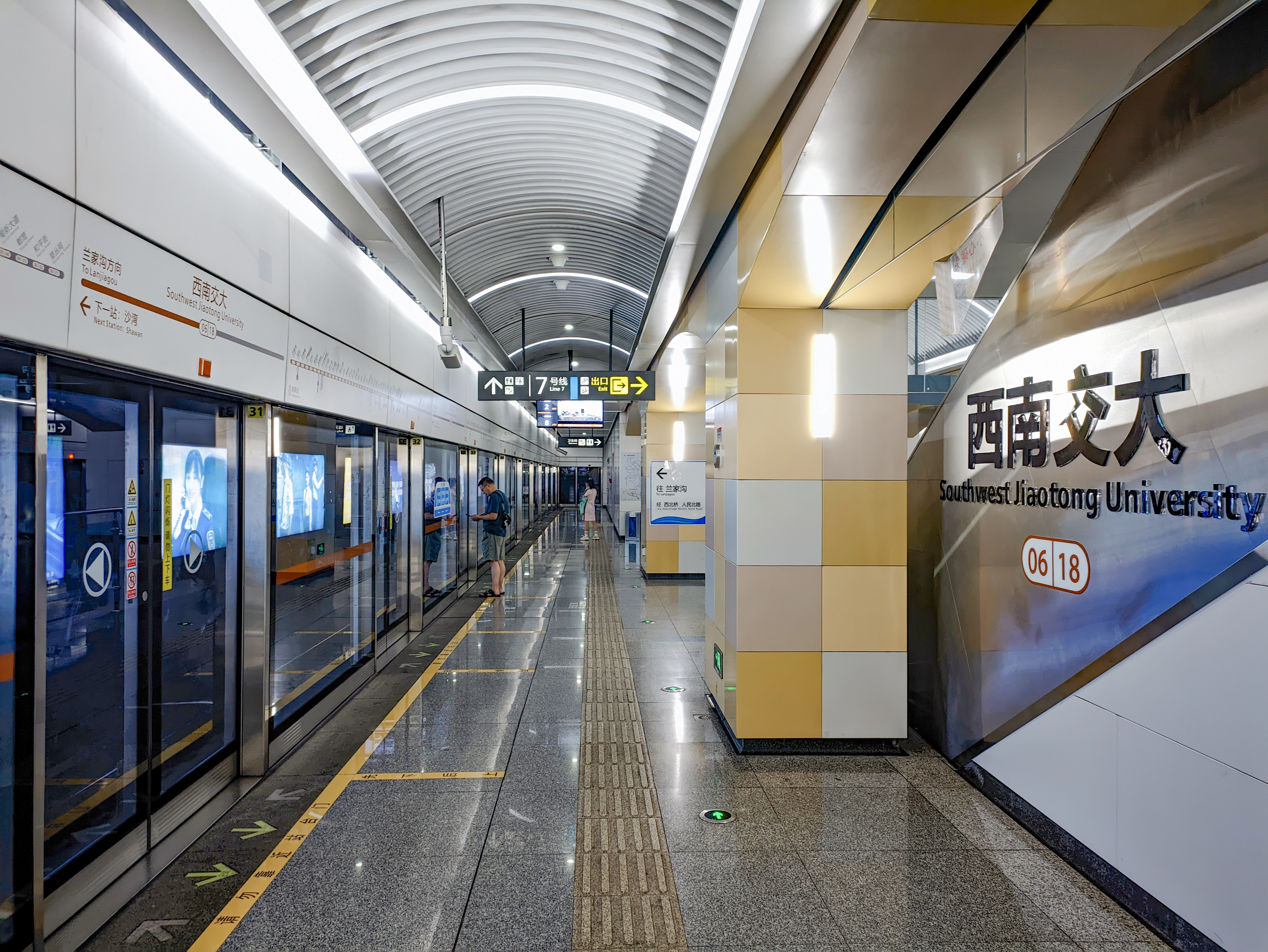
- Line 6 platform

General information
- Location: Jinniu District, Chengdu, Sichuan; China
- Coordinates: 30.6968°N 104.0473°E
- Operator: Chengdu Metro Limited
- Lines: Line 6 Line 7
- Platforms: 4 (2 island platforms)

Other information
- Station code: 0618 0704

History
- Opened: 6 December 2017

Services
Preceding station	Chengdu Metro	Following station
Xinghe towards Wangcong Temple	Line 6	Shawan towards Lanjiagou
Jiulidi Clockwise	Line 7	Huazhaobi Anticlockwise
Location

Southwest Jiaotong University (Chinese: 西南交大) is a station on Line 6 and Line 7 of the Chengdu Metro in China. It was opened on 6 December 2017. The station serves the nearby Southwest Jiaotong University.

== Station layout ==
G	Entrances and Exits	Exits A, C-G
B1	Concourse	Faregates, Station Agent
B2	Clockwise	← Line 7 to Cuijiadian (Jiulidi)
B2	Island platform, doors open on the left
B2	Counterclockwise	Line 7 to Cuijiadian (Huazhaobi) →
B3	Northbound	← Line 6 to Wangcong Temple (Xinghe)
B3	Island platform, doors open on the left
B3	Southbound	Line 6 to Lanjiagou (Shawan) →

== Gallery ==
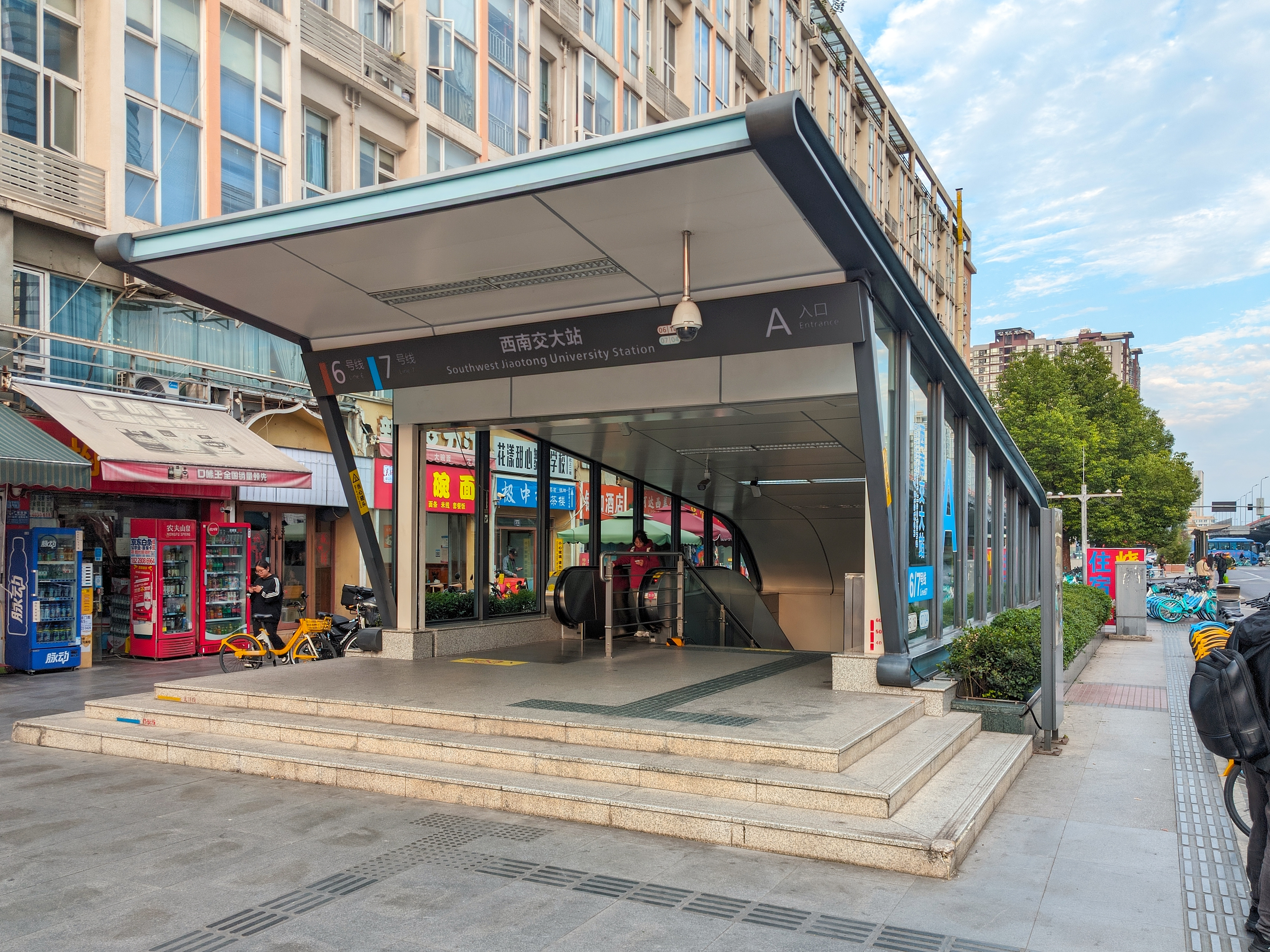
Entrance A

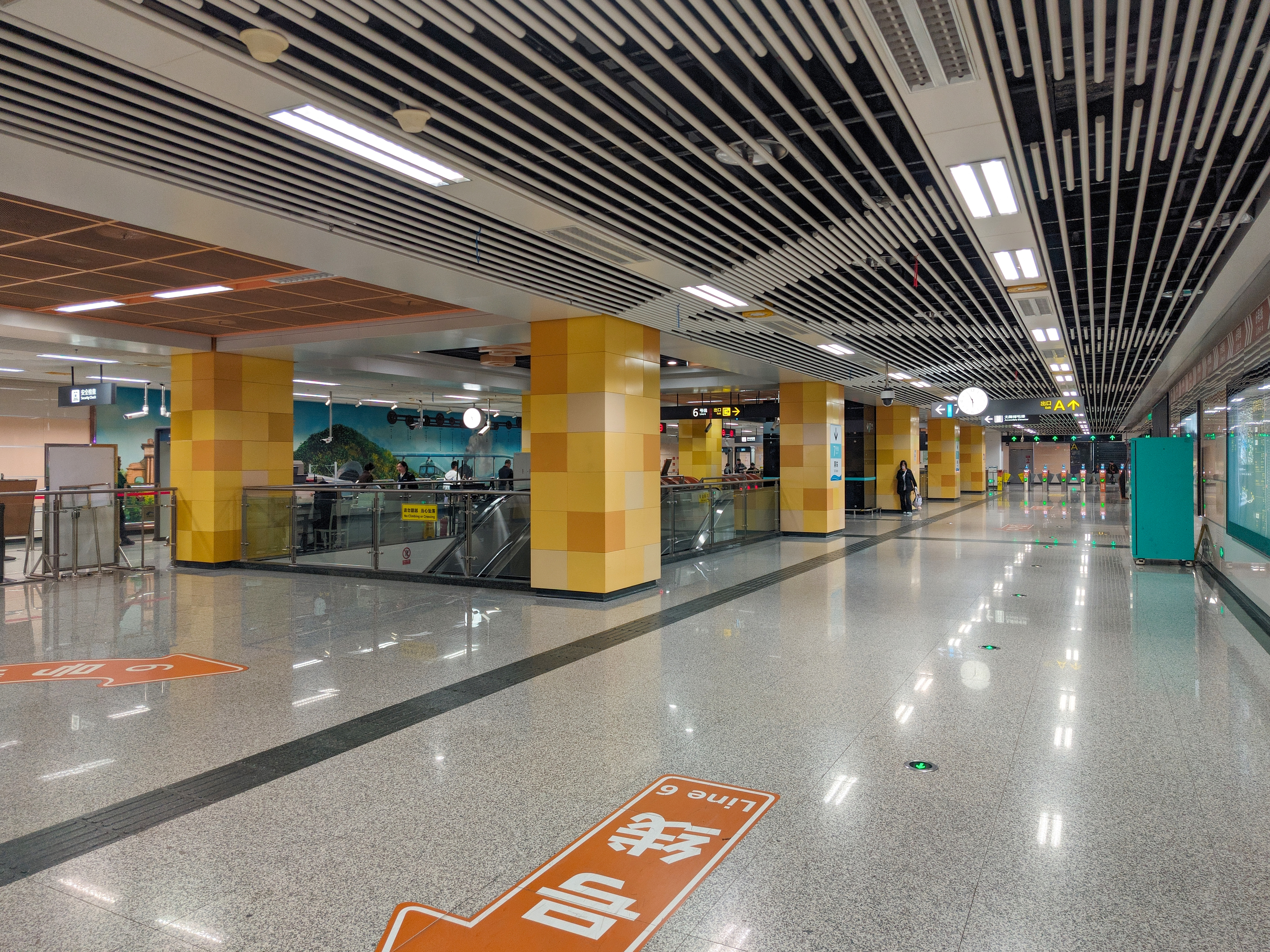
Concourse

Line 6 platform

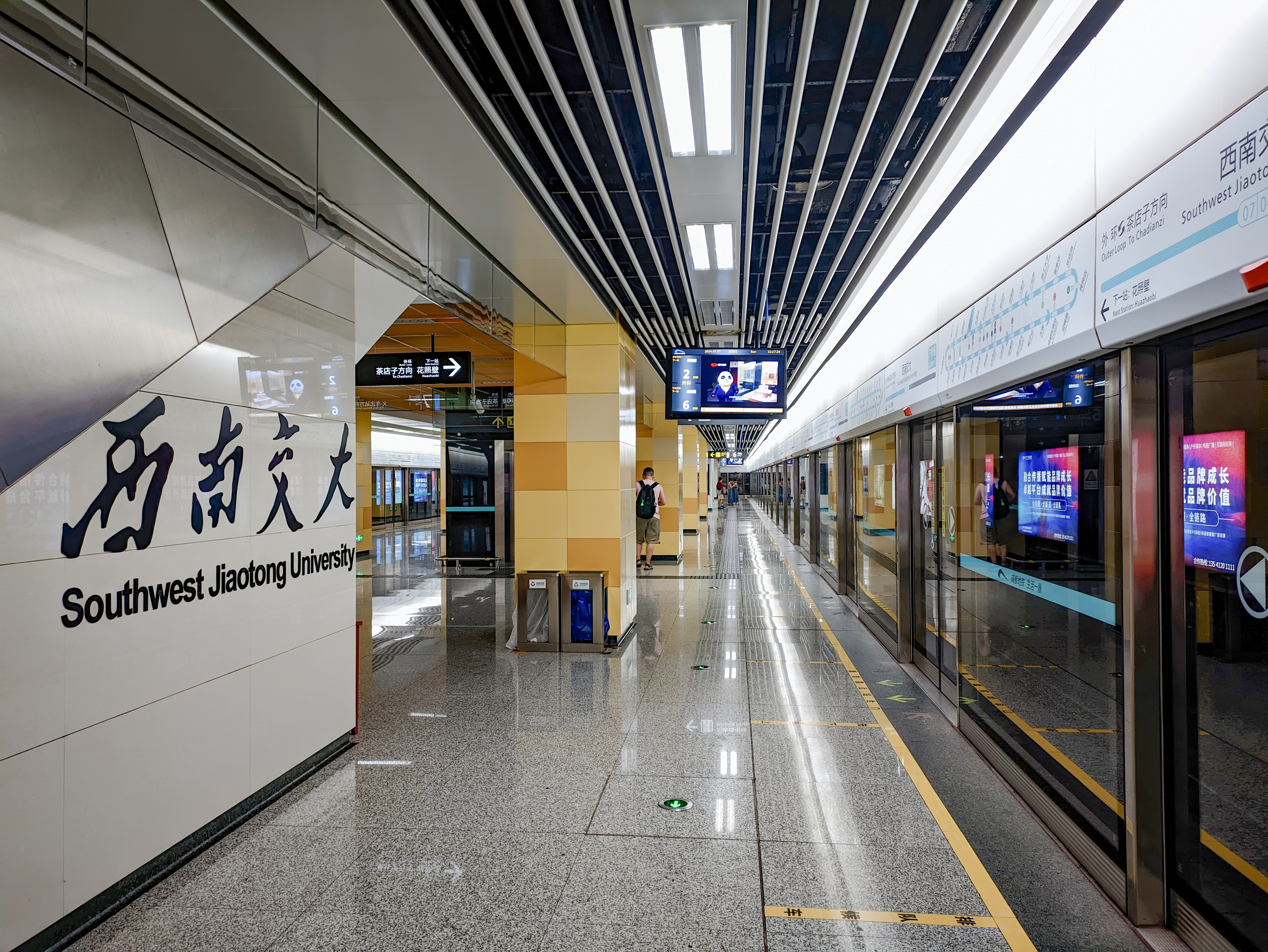
Line 7 platform
