= Line 27 (Chengdu Metro) =

Metro line in Chengdu, China

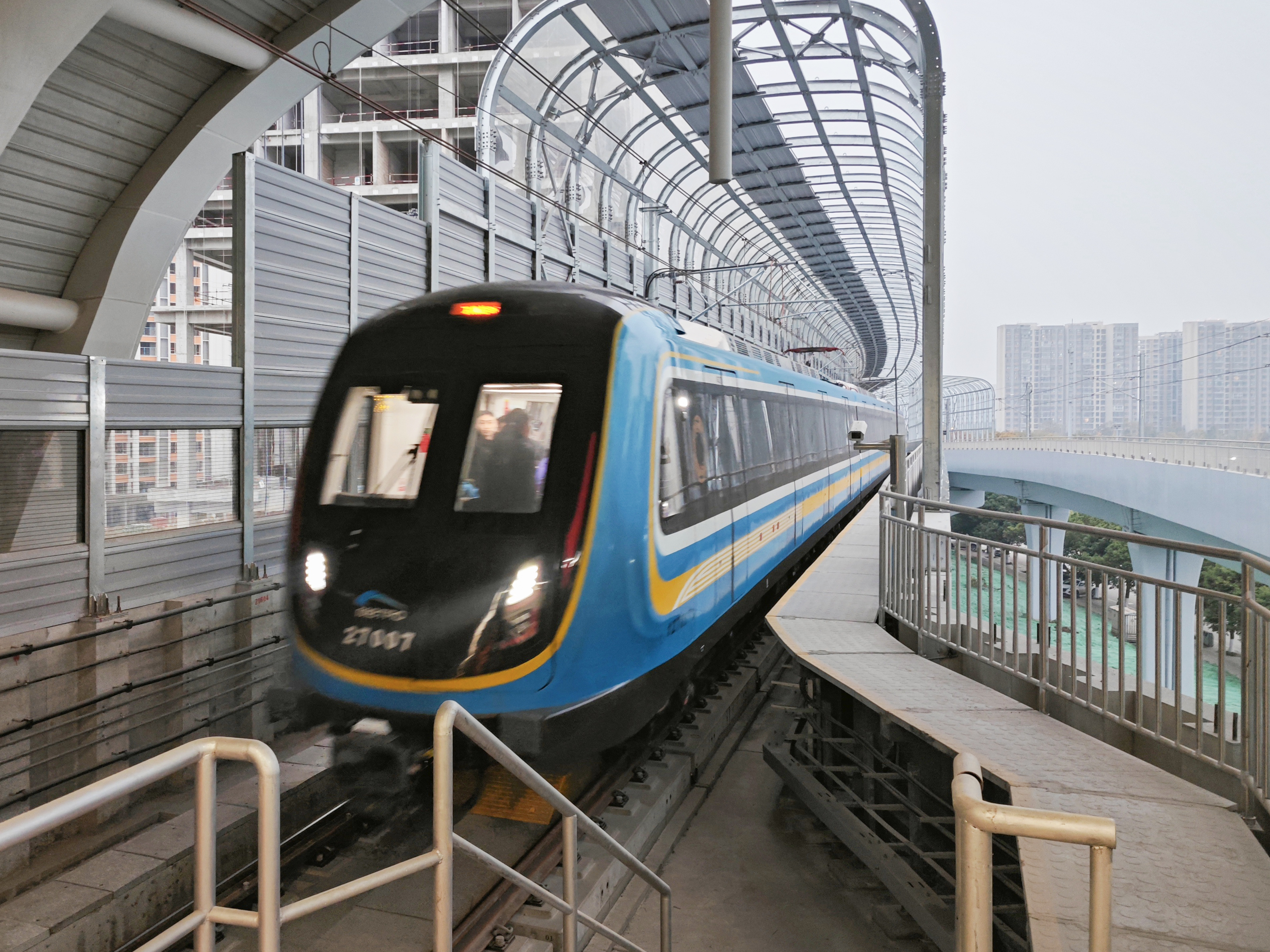
- Line 27 train entering Sanshengsi station

Overview
- Status: In operation
- Owner: Chengdu
- Locale: Chengdu, Sichuan
- Termini: Shifo; Shuxin Road
- Stations: 23

Service
- Type: Rapid transit
- System: Chengdu Metro
- Services: 1
- Operator(s): Chengdu Metro Limited

History
- Opened: 19 December 2024; 15 months ago

Technical
- Line length: 24.86 km (15.45 mi)
- Number of tracks: 2
- Character: Underground/Elevated
- Track gauge: 1,435 mm (4 ft 8 1/2 in)
- Operating speed: 80 km/h (50 mph)

Chengdu Metro Line 27 (Chinese: 成都地铁27号线; pinyin: Chéngdū Dìtiě Èrshíqī Hào Xiàn) is a rapid transit line in Chengdu, Sichuan, China. It is a tangential line that runs diagonally from the west to the north of Chengdu. The train uses 6 car B-type trains. Line 27's colour is light blue.

On 21 August 2019, the National Development and Reform Commission approved the 4th stage of development plan from Chengdu Rail Transit, which includes Line 27.

The first phase will be from Shifo station in Xindu District to Shuxin Road station in Qingyang District. The line is 24.86 km long with 23 stations. From the north, the line has a 7.52 km long elevated section with 6 stations, followed by a 17.34 km underground section with 17 stations. Phase 1 started construction on 18 May 2020, and is opened on 19 December 2024.

== Progress ==
- On 17 June 2019, the NDRC approved the fourth phase expansion for the Chengdu Metro. It consists of Line 8 Phase 2, Line 10 Phase 3, Line 13 Phase 1, Line 17 Phase 2, Line 18 Phase 3, Line 19 Phase 2, Line 27 Phase 1, Line 30 Phase 1. The Fourth Phase consists of 176.65 km (109.77 mi) of new lines.
- On 18 March 2020, construction started on Line 8 Phase 2, Line 19 Phase 2, Line 27 Phase 1, and Line 30 Phase 1.
- On 18 May 2020，Line 8 Phase 2, Line 27 Phase 1, Line 30 Phase 1 started construction. This marks the date all 4th Phase projects started construction.
- On 21 March 2023, Line 27 finished all station construction.
- On 19 December 2024, Line 27 opened for service, except Bairendian station which its connection roads are currently incomplete.

== Stations ==
There are 7.52 km that are on ground with 6 stations; and a 17.34 km underground tunnel with 17 stations. Phase 1 has 9 interchange stations.

Services		Station №	Station name		Station Type		Transfer	District
Services		Station №	English	Chinese	Alignment	Platform Configuration	Transfer	District
●		2701	Shifo	石佛	Elevated	Island		Xindu
●		2702	Ciyi	慈义	Elevated	Island		Xindu
●		2703	Xingcheng Avenue	兴城大道	Elevated	Island		Xindu
●		2704	Zhantan Temple	旃檀寺	Elevated	Island		Xindu
●		2705	Shimenkan	石门坎	Elevated	Island		Jinniu
●	●	2706	Sanshengsi	三圣寺	Elevated	Island		Jinniu
●	●	2707	Fanjia Alley	范家巷	Underground	Island		Jinniu
●	●	2708	Liyuwan	鲤鱼湾	Underground	Island		Jinniu
|	|	2709	Bairendian	白仁店	Underground	Island		Jinniu
●	●	2710	Laijiadian	赖家店	Underground	Island		Jinniu
●	●	2711	Weijianian	韦家碾	Underground	Island	1	Jinniu
●	●	2712	Shuangshuinian	双水碾	Underground	Island		Chenghua
●	●	2713	Wangjiaqiao	王贾桥	Underground	Island		Jinniu
●	●	2714	Dongzikou	洞子口	Underground	Island	5	Jinniu
●	●	2715	Shaheyuan	沙河源	Underground	Island		Jinniu
●	●	2716	Xinqiao	新桥	Underground	Island		Jinniu
●	●	2717	Jinfu	金府	Underground	Island	6	Jinniu
●	●	2718	Huazhaobi North	花照壁北	Underground	Island		Jinniu
●	●	2719	Jinniu Park	金牛公园	Underground	Island		Jinniu
●	●	2720	Yangxi Flyover	羊犀立交	Underground	Island	2	Jinniu
●	●	2721	Huangzhong	黄忠	Underground	Island		Jinniu
●	●	2722	Jinsha Binhe Park	金沙滨河公园	Underground	Island		Qingyang
●	●	2723	Shuxin Road	蜀鑫路	Underground	Island		Qingyang
