= Xibei Bridge station =

Metro station in Chengdu, China

Xibei Bridge 西北桥
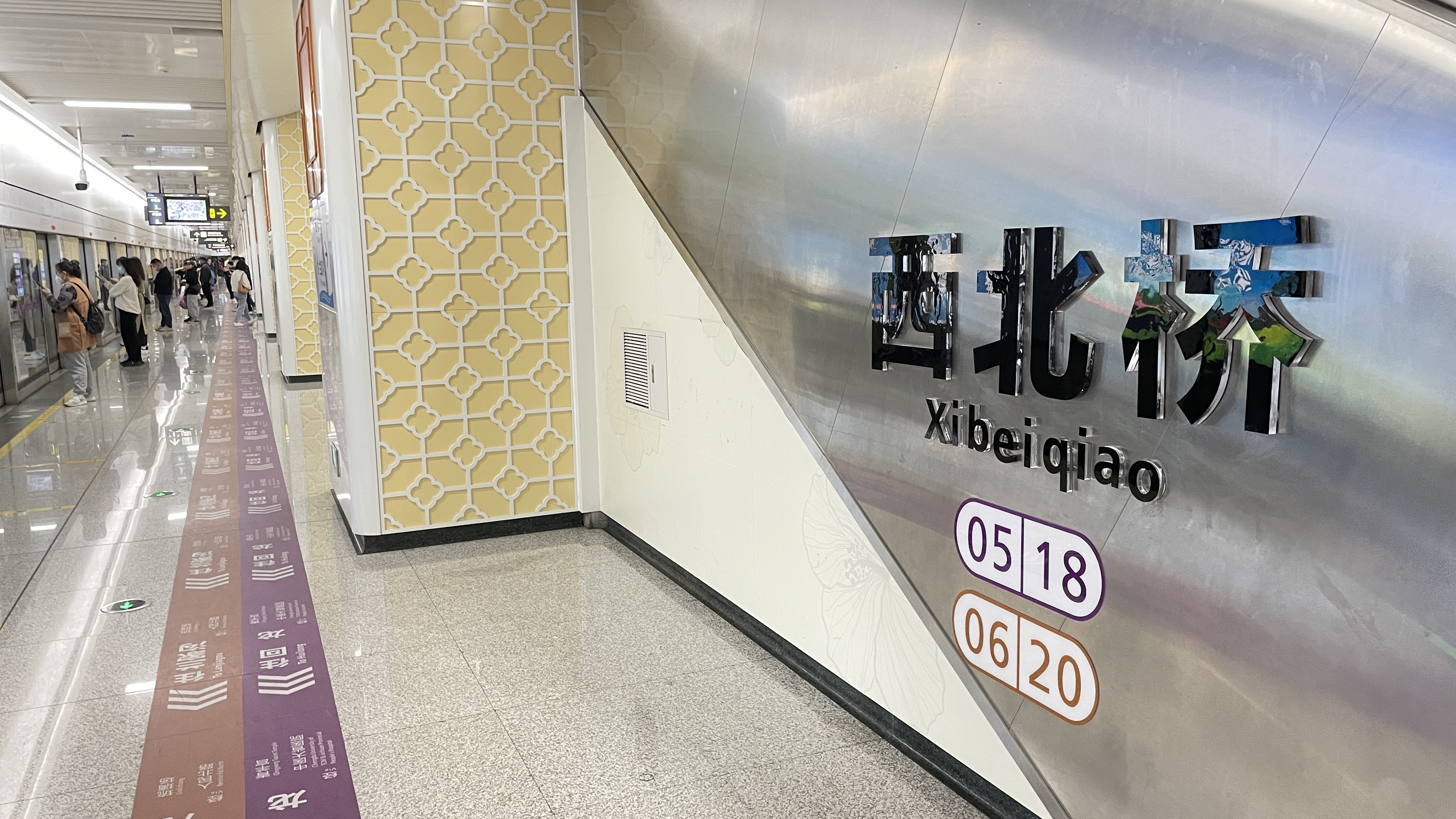

General information
- Location: Jinniu District, Chengdu, Sichuan; China
- Coordinates: 30.68812°N 104.0556°E
- Operated by: Chengdu Metro Limited
- Line(s): Line 5 Line 6
- Platforms: 4 (2 island platforms)

Construction
- Structure type: Underground

Other information
- Station code: 0518 0620

History
- Opened: 27 December 2019 (Line 5); 18 December 2020 (Line 6)
- Previous names: Xibeiqiao

Services
Preceding station	Chengdu Metro	Following station
2nd Beizhan West Road towards Huagui Road	Line 5	Huapaifang towards Huilong
Shawan towards Wangcong Temple	Line 6	Renmin North Road towards Lanjiagou

Xibei Bridge (Chinese: 西北桥), formerly known as Xibeiqiao, is a station on Line 5 and Line 6 of the Chengdu Metro in China. It was opened on 27 December 2019. Opposite direction cross-platform interchange is provided between the two lines at this station.

== Station layout ==
G	Ground level	Exits A, B, D
B1	Concourse	Faregates, Station Agent
B2	Southbound	Line 6 towards Lanjiagou (Renmin North Road) →
B2	Island platform, doors open on the right
B2	Southbound	← Line 5 towards Huilong (Huapaifang)
B3	Northbound	← Line 6 to Wangcong Temple (Shawan)
B3	Island platform, doors open on the left
B3	Northbound	Line 5 to Huagui Road (2nd Beizhan West Road) →
