= 2nd Beizhan West Road station =

Chengdu Metro station

Coordinates: 30.6962°N 104.0638°E

2nd Beizhan West Road 北站西二路
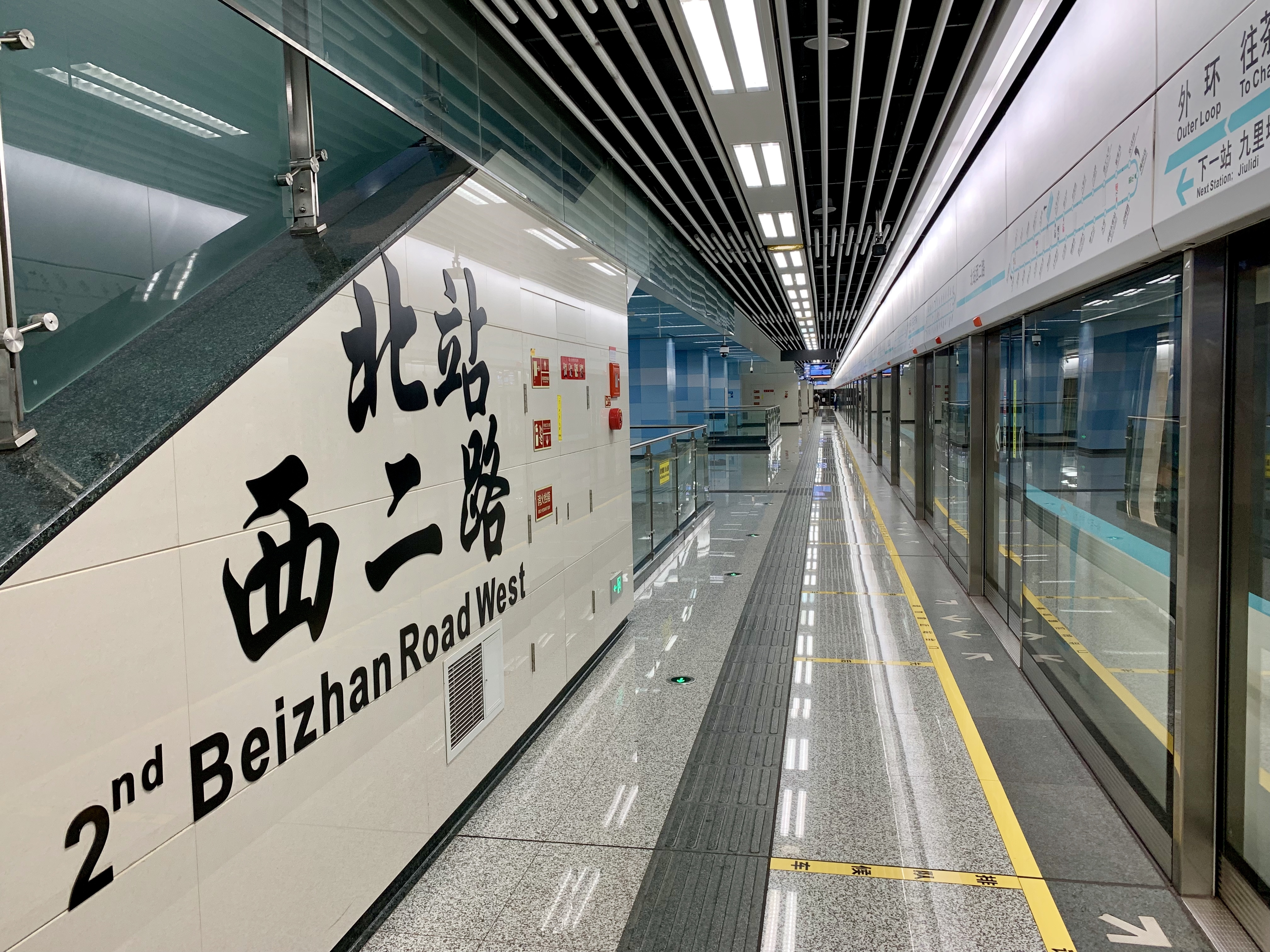
- Line 7 platform

General information
- Location: Jinniu District, Chengdu, Sichuan; China
- Operator: Chengdu Metro Limited
- Lines: Line 5 Line 7
- Platforms: 4 (2 island platforms)

Other information
- Station code: 0517 0702

History
- Opened: 6 December 2017
- Former names: 2nd Beizhan Road West

Services
Preceding station	Chengdu Metro	Following station
Saiyuntai towards Huagui Road	Line 5	Xibei Bridge towards Huilong
North Railway Station Clockwise	Line 7	Jiulidi Anticlockwise
Location

2nd Beizhan West Road station (Chinese: 北站西二路站; pinyin: Běizhànxī'èr Lù zhàn), formerly known as 2nd Beizhan Road West station, is a transfer station on Line 5 and Line 7 of the Chengdu Metro in China. It was opened on 6 December 2017.

== Station layout ==
G	Ground level	Exits
B1	Concourse	Faregates, Station Agent
B2	Clockwise	← Line 7 to Cuijiadian (North Railway Station)
B2	Island platform, doors open on the left
B2	Counterclockwise	Line 7 to Cuijiadian (Jiulidi) →
B3	Northbound	← Line 5 to Huagui Road (Saiyuntai)
B3	Island platform, doors open on the left
B3	Southbound	Line 5 to Huilong (Xibei Bridge) →

== Gallery ==
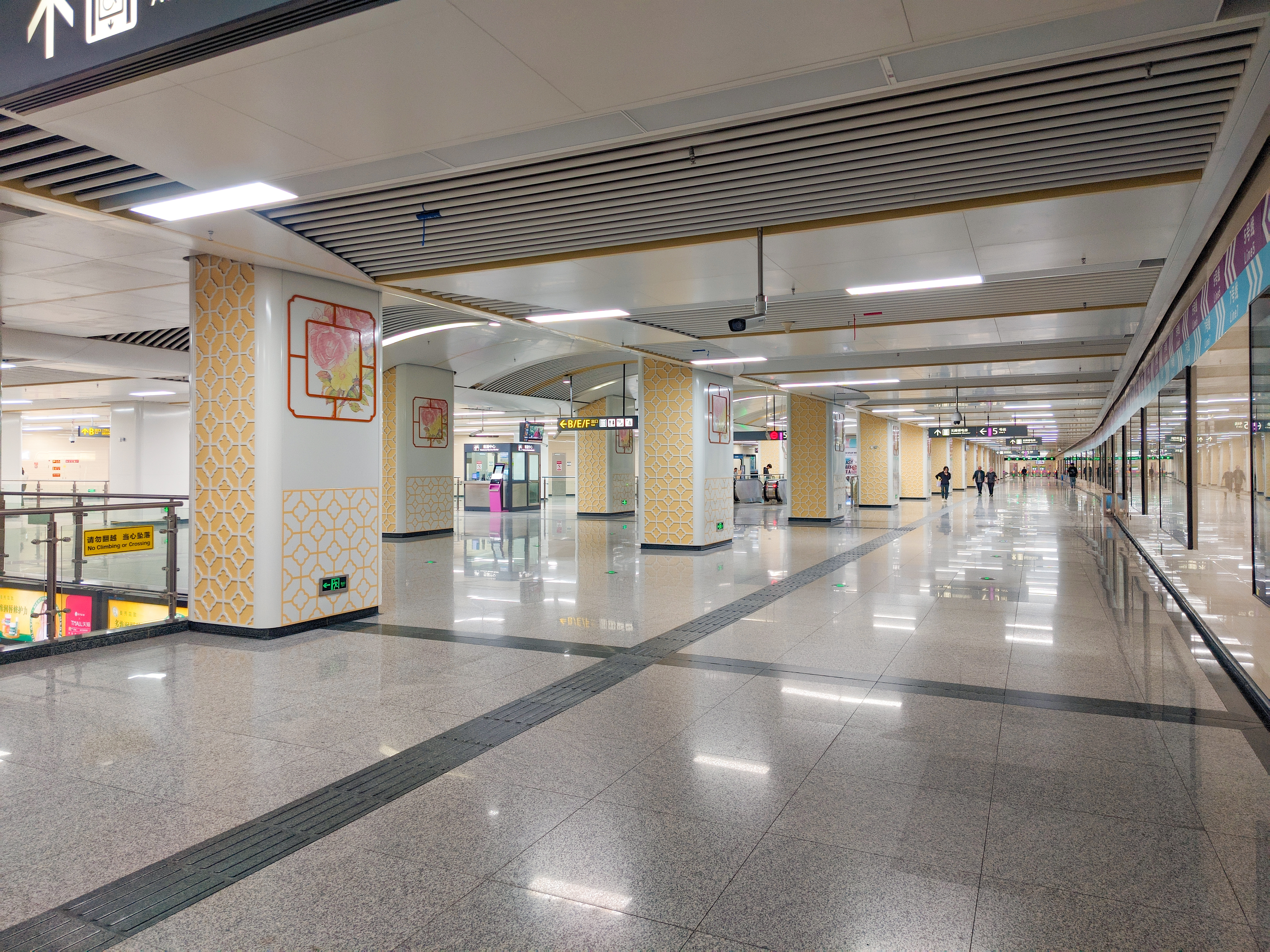
Line 5 concourse

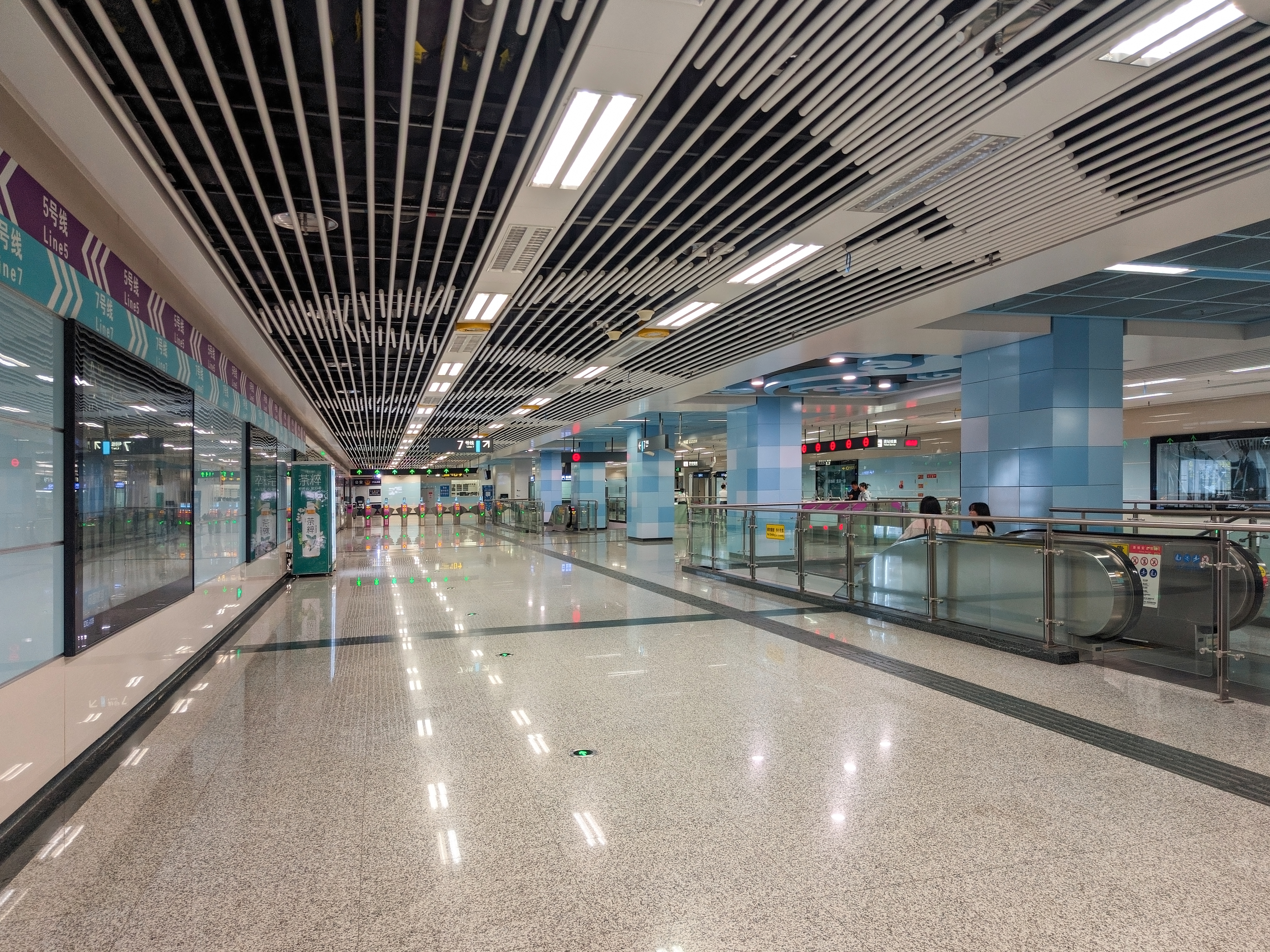
Line 7 concourse

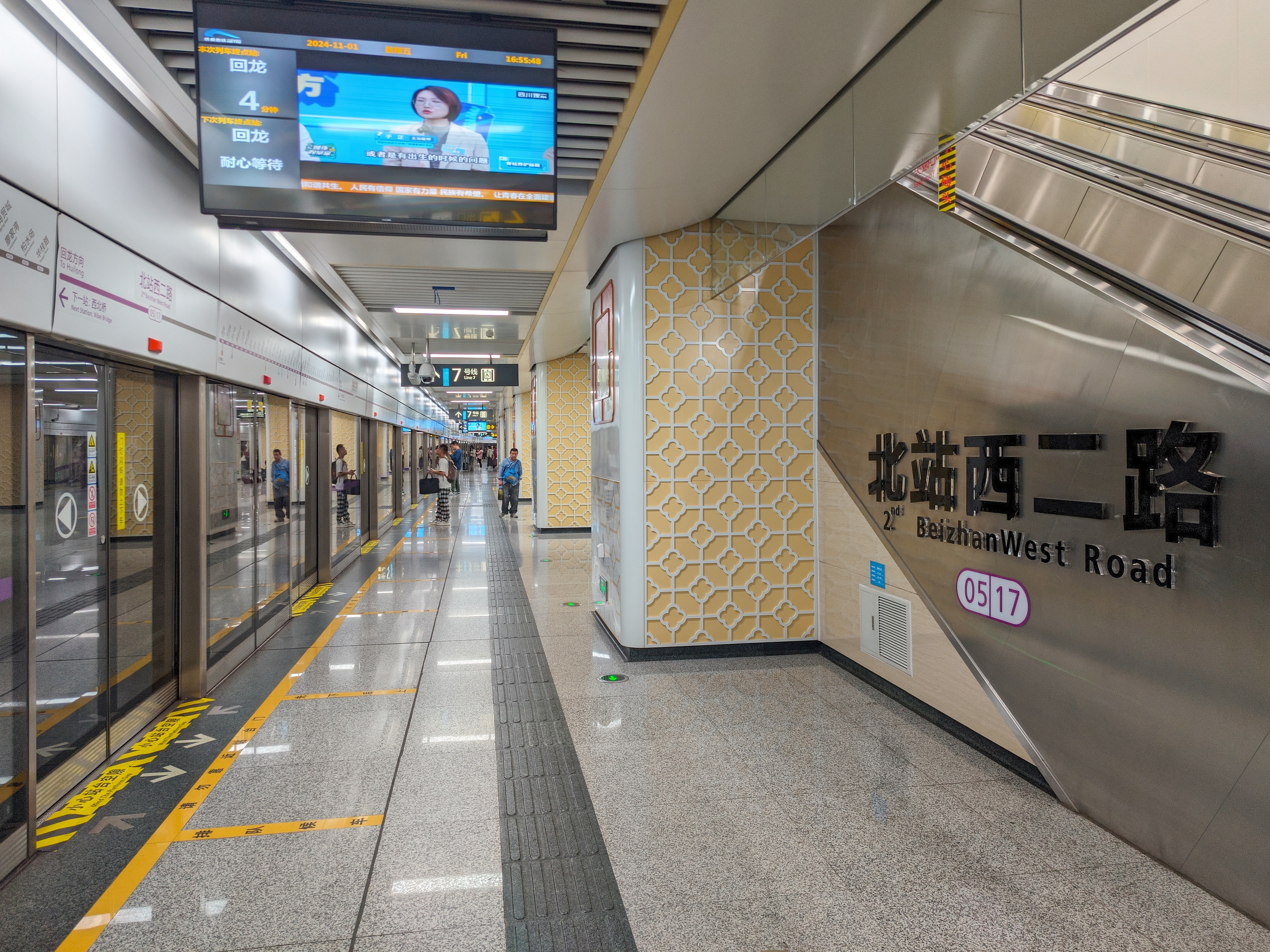
Line 5 platform

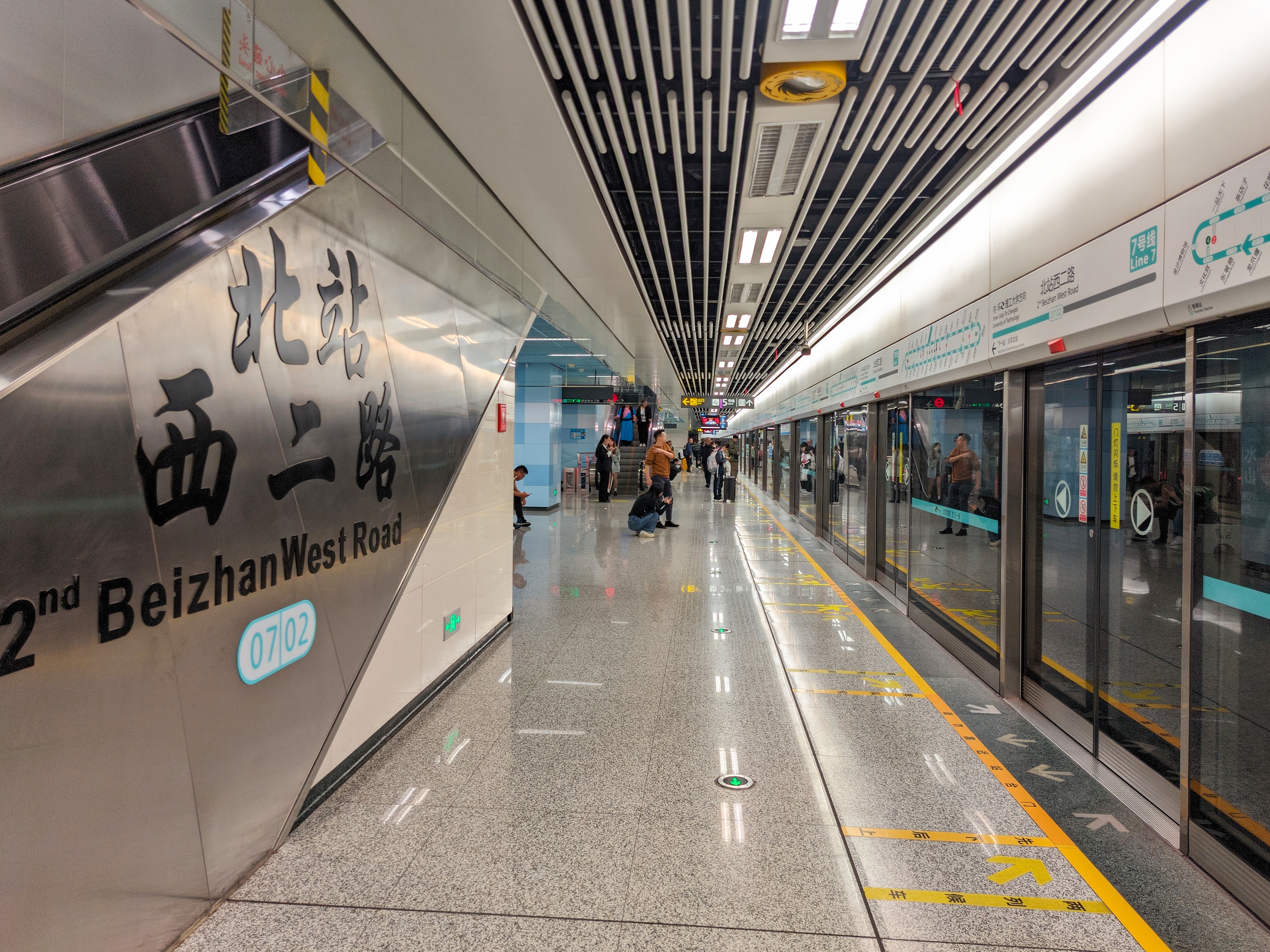
Line 7 platform
