= Xintong Avenue station =

Metro station in Chengdu, China

Xintong Avenue 新通大道
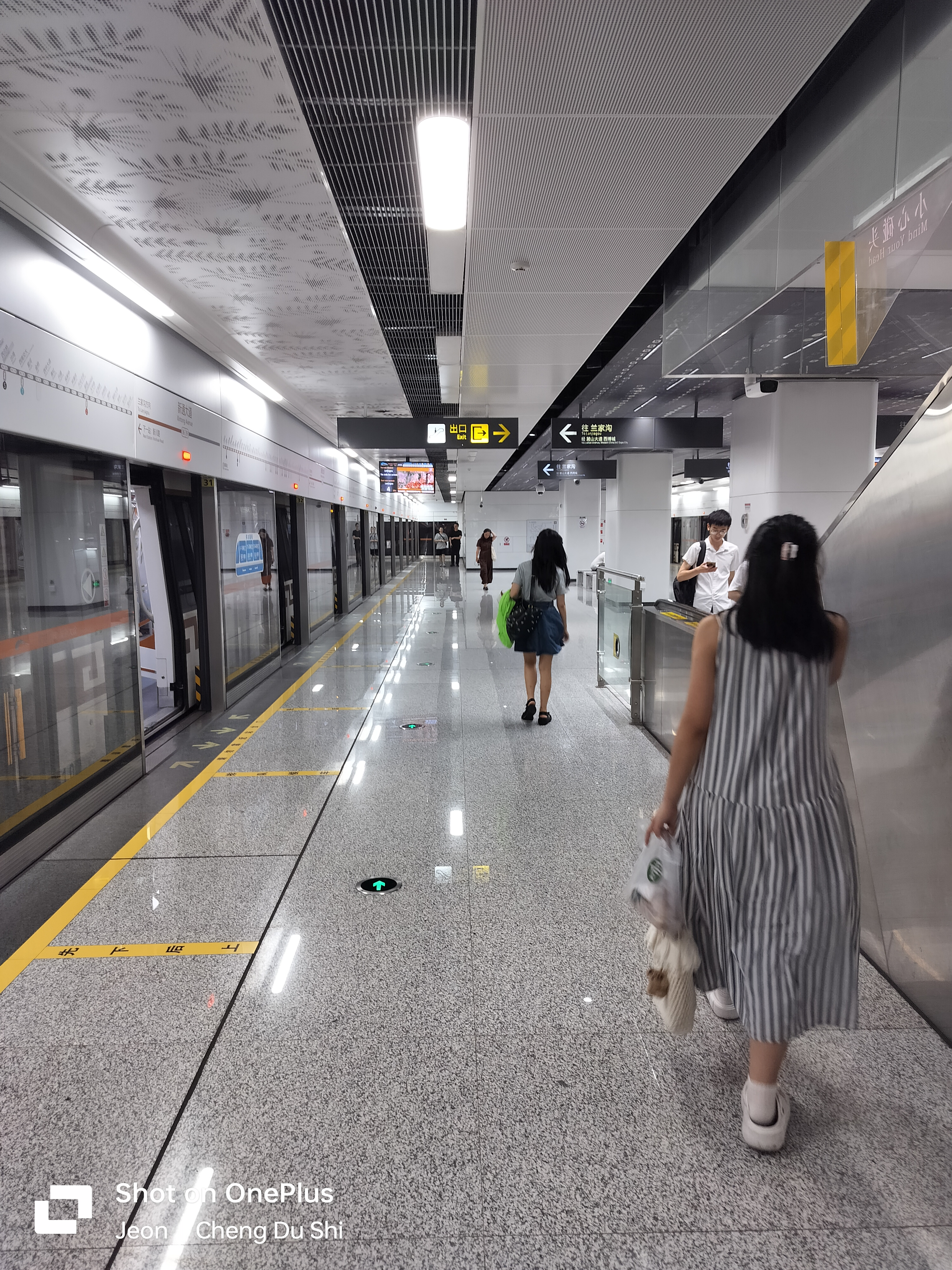

General information
- Location: Shuangliu District, Chengdu, Sichuan; China
- Coordinates: 30.52418°N 104.09595°E
- Operated by: Chengdu Metro Limited
- Line(s): Line 6
- Platforms: 2 (1 island platform)

Other information
- Station code: 0639

History
- Opened: 18 December 2020

Services
Preceding station	Chengdu Metro	Following station
Guandong towards Wangcong Temple	Line 6	Xinchuan Road towards Lanjiagou
Location

Xintong Avenue Station is a metro station at Chengdu, Sichuan, China. It opened on December 18, 2020 with the opening of Chengdu Metro Line 6.
