= Shenyang Road station =

Metro station in Chengdu, China

Shenyang Road 沈阳路
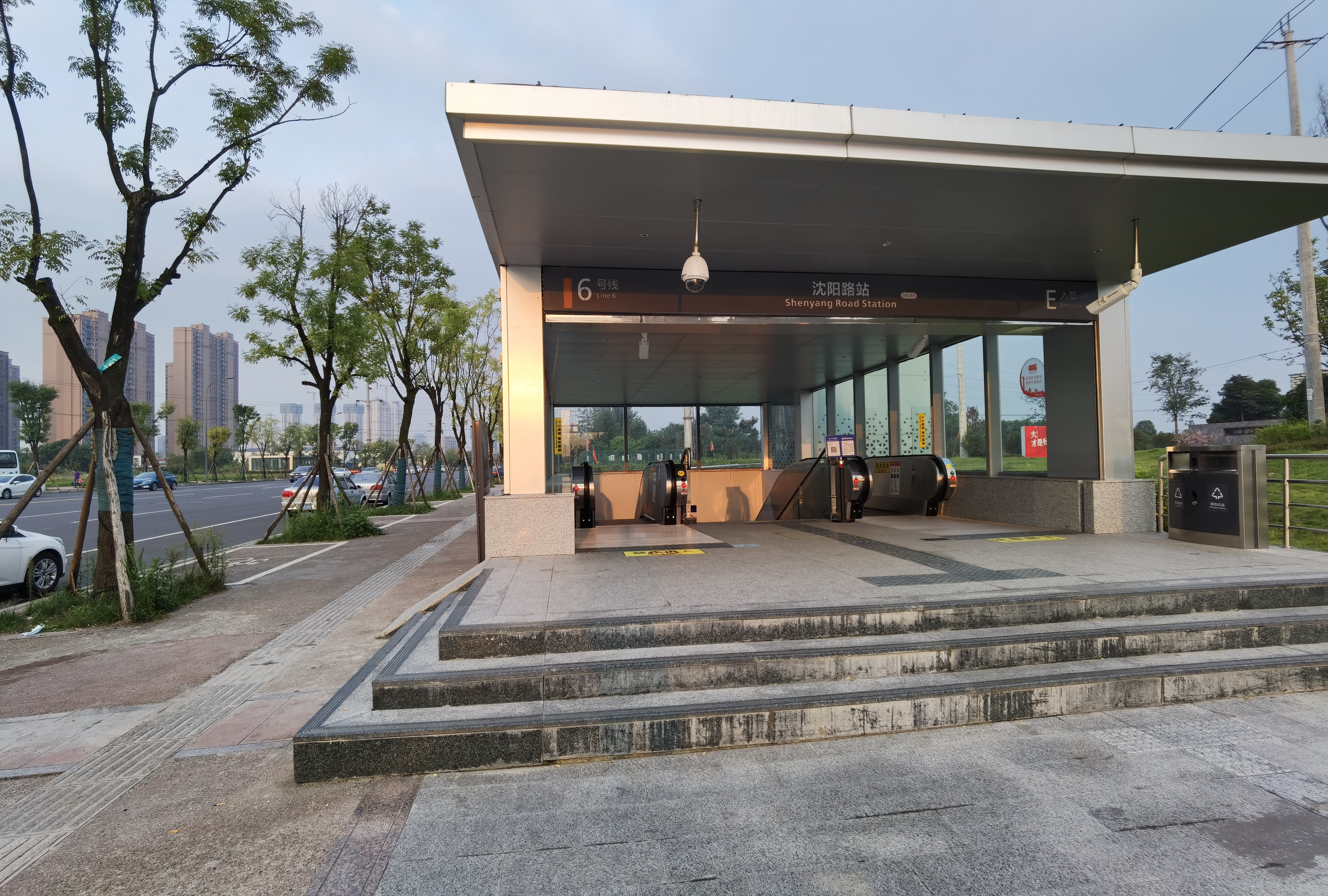
- Entrance E

General information
- Location: Shuangliu District, Chengdu, Sichuan; China
- Operated by: Chengdu Metro Limited
- Line: Line 6
- Platforms: 2 (1 island platform)

Other information
- Station code: 0645

History
- Opened: 18 December 2020

Services
Preceding station	Chengdu Metro	Following station
Lushan Avenue towards Wangcong Temple	Line 6	Qingdao Road towards Lanjiagou
Location

Shenyang Road Station is a metro station at Chengdu, Sichuan, China. It opened on December 18, 2020 with the opening of Chengdu Metro Line 6.
