= Luxiao station =

Metro station in Chengdu, China

Luxiao 陆肖
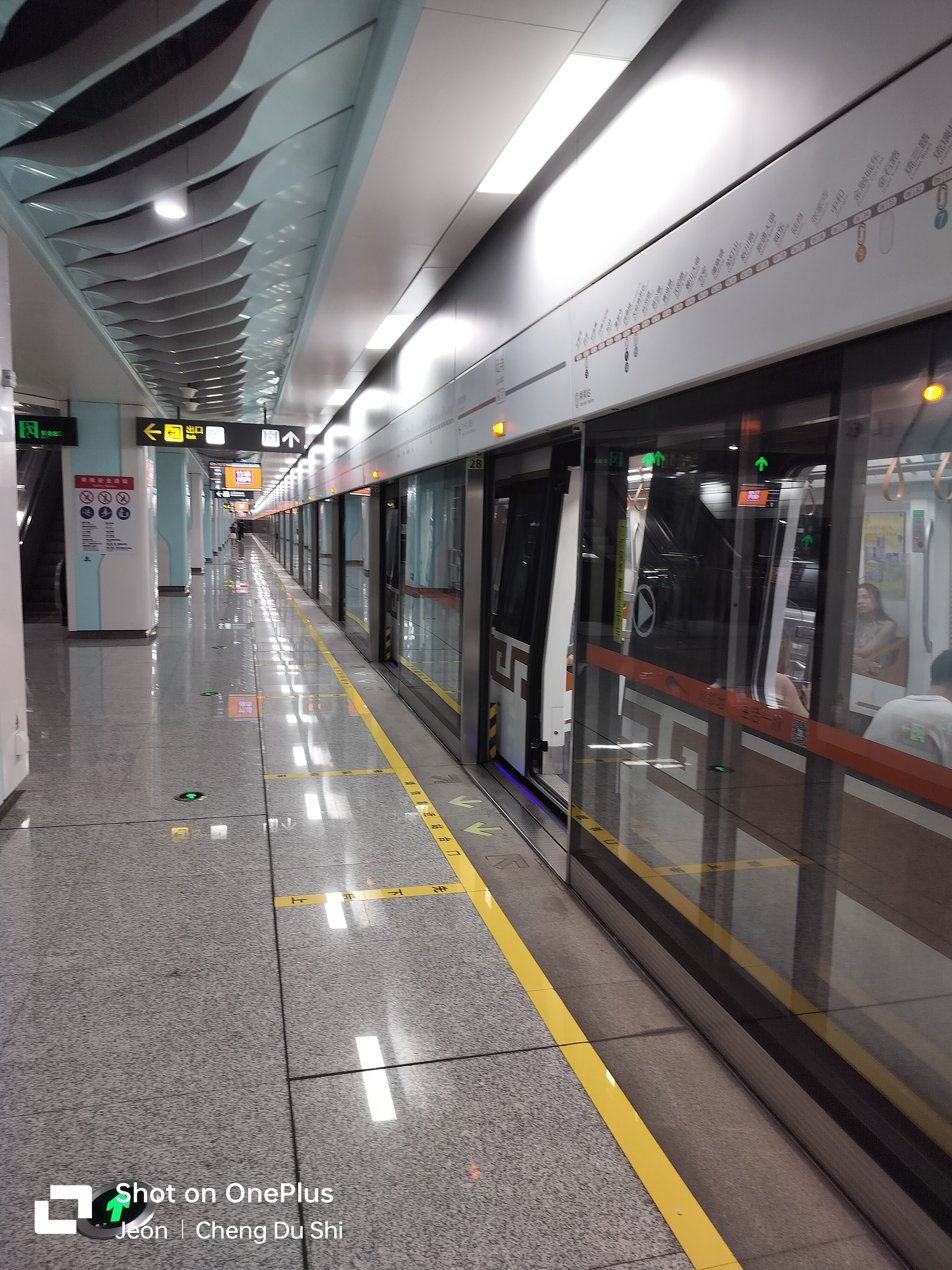

General information
- Location: Shuangliu District, Chengdu, Sichuan; China
- Operated by: Chengdu Metro Limited
- Line: Line 6
- Platforms: 2 (1 island platform)

Other information
- Station code: 0637

History
- Opened: 18 December 2020

Services
Preceding station	Chengdu Metro	Following station
Zhangjiasi towards Wangcong Temple	Line 6	Guandong towards Lanjiagou
Location

Luxiao Station is a metro station at Chengdu, Sichuan, China. It opened on December 18, 2020 with the opening of Chengdu Metro Line 6.
