= Financial City East station =

Metro station in Chengdu, China

Financial City East 金融城东
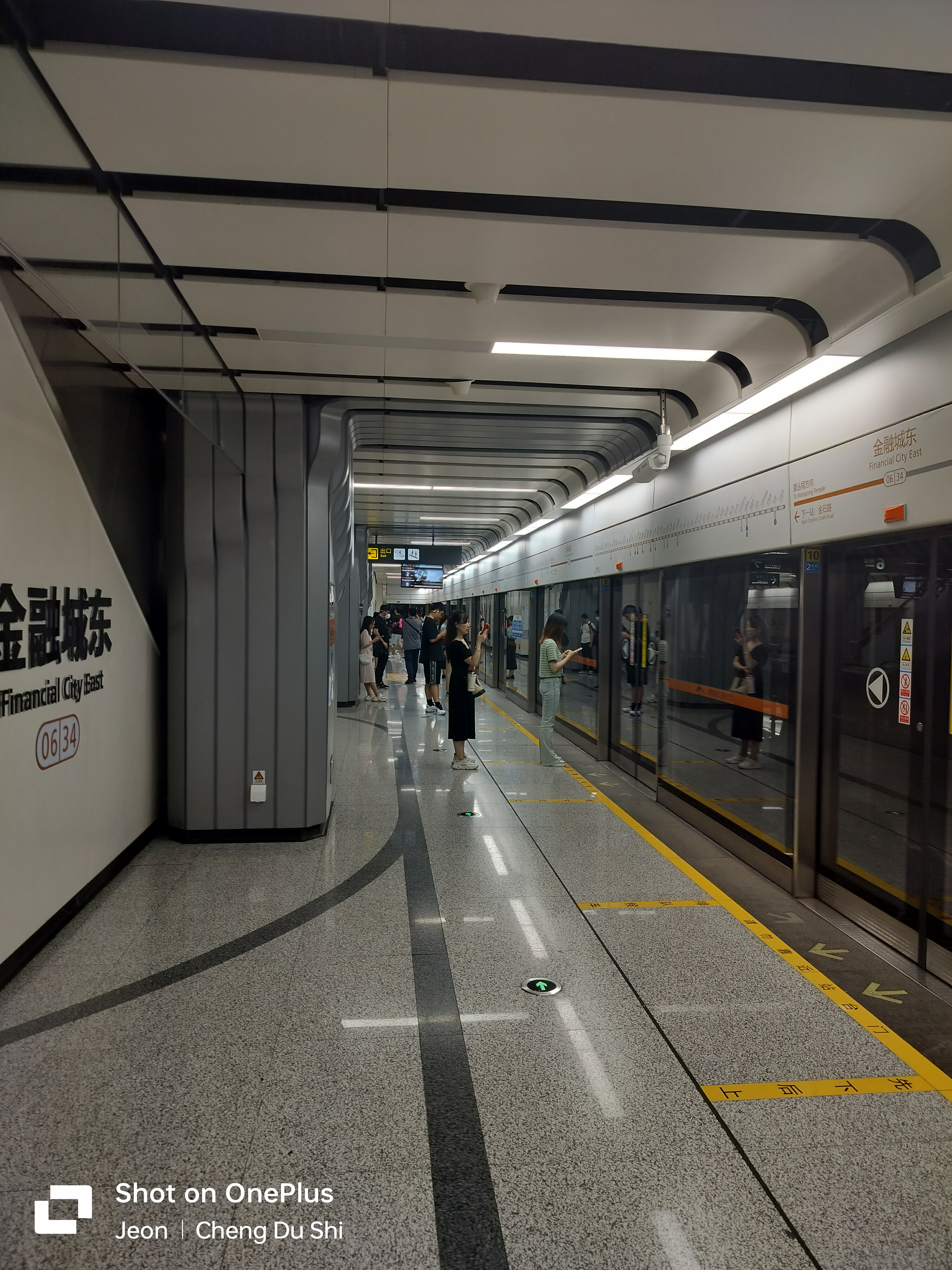
- Line 6 platform

General information
- Location: Jinjiang District, Chengdu, Sichuan; China
- Operated by: Chengdu Metro Limited
- Lines: Line 6 Line 9
- Platforms: 4 (2 island platforms)

Other information
- Station code: 0634 0901

History
- Opened: 18 December 2020

Services
Preceding station	Chengdu Metro	Following station
Jinshi Road towards Wangcong Temple	Line 6	Zhonghe towards Lanjiagou
Terminus	Line 9	Xindao towards Huangtianba
Location

Financial City East Station is a metro station in Chengdu, Sichuan, China. It was opened on December 18, 2020, with the opening of Line 6 and Line 9.
