= Honggao Road station =

Metro station in Chengdu, China

Honggao Road 红高路
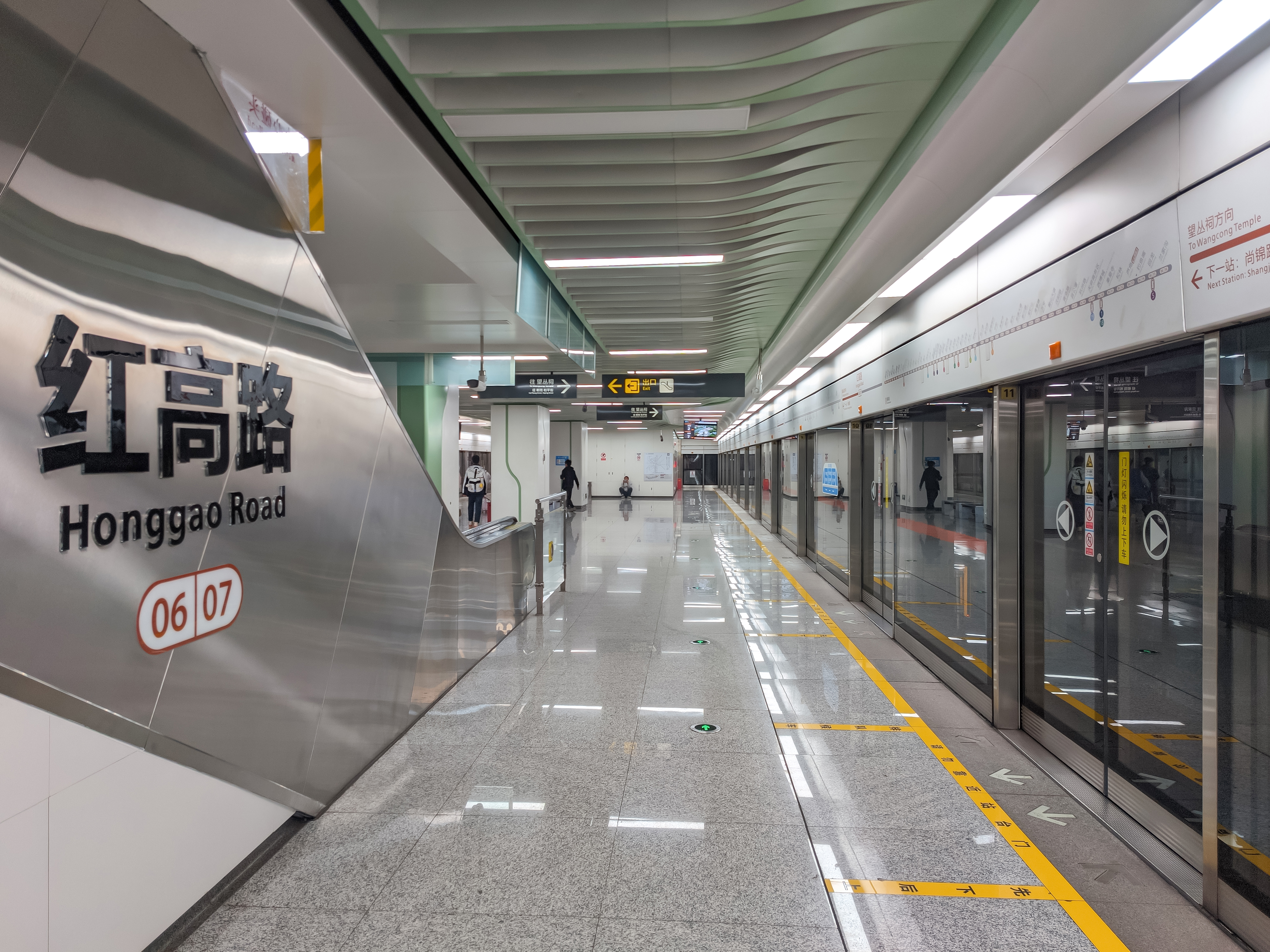

General information
- Location: Pidu District, Chengdu, Sichuan; China
- Operated by: Chengdu Metro Limited
- Line: Line 6
- Platforms: 2 (1 island platform)

Other information
- Station code: 0607

History
- Opened: 18 December 2020

Services
Preceding station	Chengdu Metro	Following station
Shangjin Road towards Wangcong Temple	Line 6	Tianyu Road towards Lanjiagou
Location

Honggao Road Station is a metro station at Chengdu, Sichuan, China. It opened on December 18, 2020 with the opening of Chengdu Metro Line 6.
