= Mengzi station =

Metro station in Chengdu, China

Coordinates: 30.7873°N 103.9122°E

Mengzi 檬梓
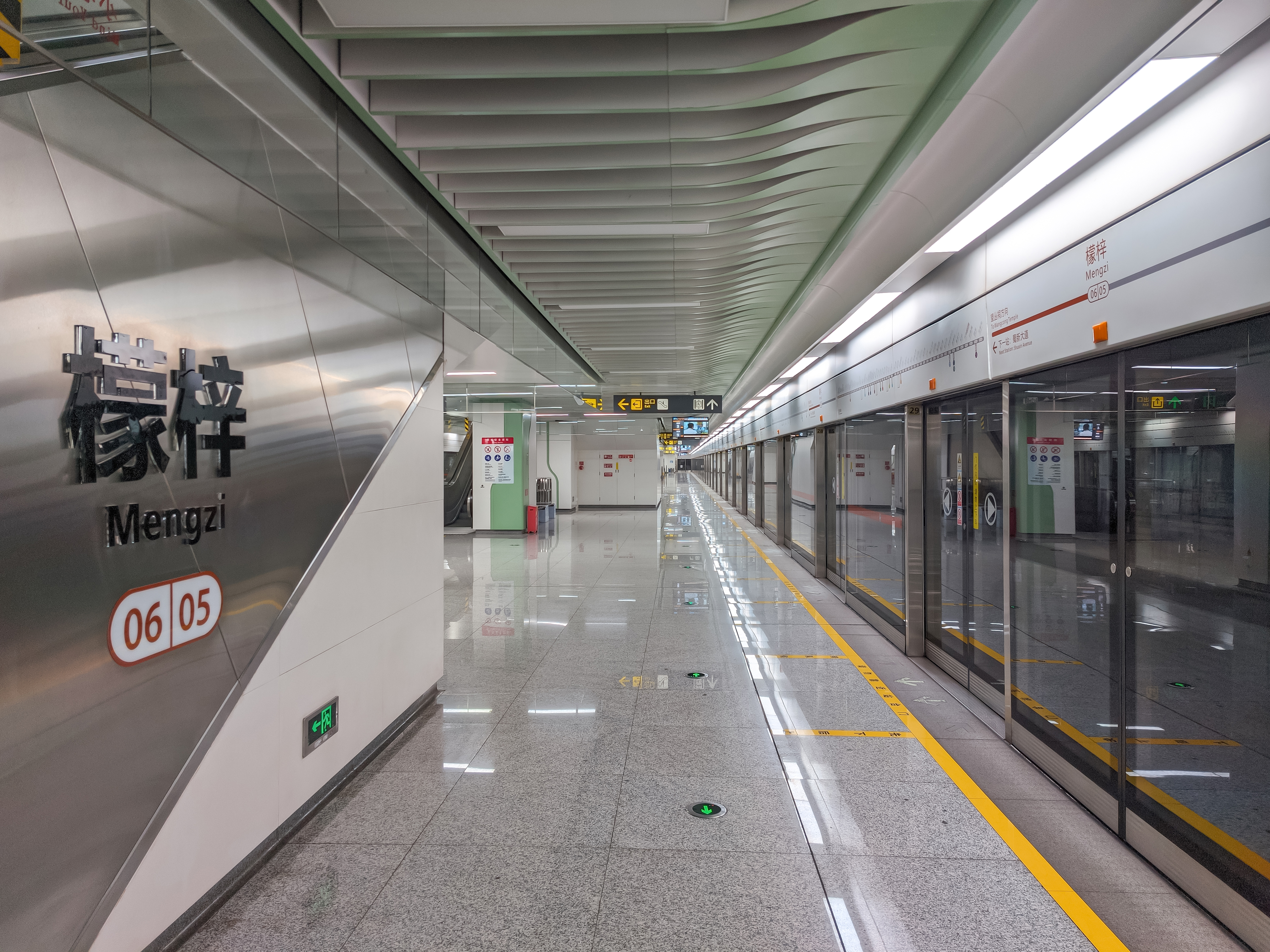

General information
- Location: Pidu District, Chengdu, Sichuan; China
- Operator: Chengdu Metro Limited
- Line: Line 6
- Platforms: 2 (1 island platform)

Other information
- Station code: 0605

History
- Opened: 18 December 2020

Services
Preceding station	Chengdu Metro	Following station
Shuxin Avenue towards Wangcong Temple	Line 6	Shangjin Road towards Lanjiagou
Location

Mengzi Station is a metro station at Chengdu, Sichuan, China. It opened on December 18, 2020 with the opening of Chengdu Metro Line 6.

== Station Overview ==
Mengzi station is located at the intersection of Pidu District, Chengdu (formerly Pixian County) Tianjian Road and West District Avenue, so the station is located in the former Mengzi Village (now Mengzi Village Community) and got this name. It was officially put into service on December 18, 2020.
