= Zitonggong station =

Metro station in Chengdu, China

Zitonggong 梓潼宫
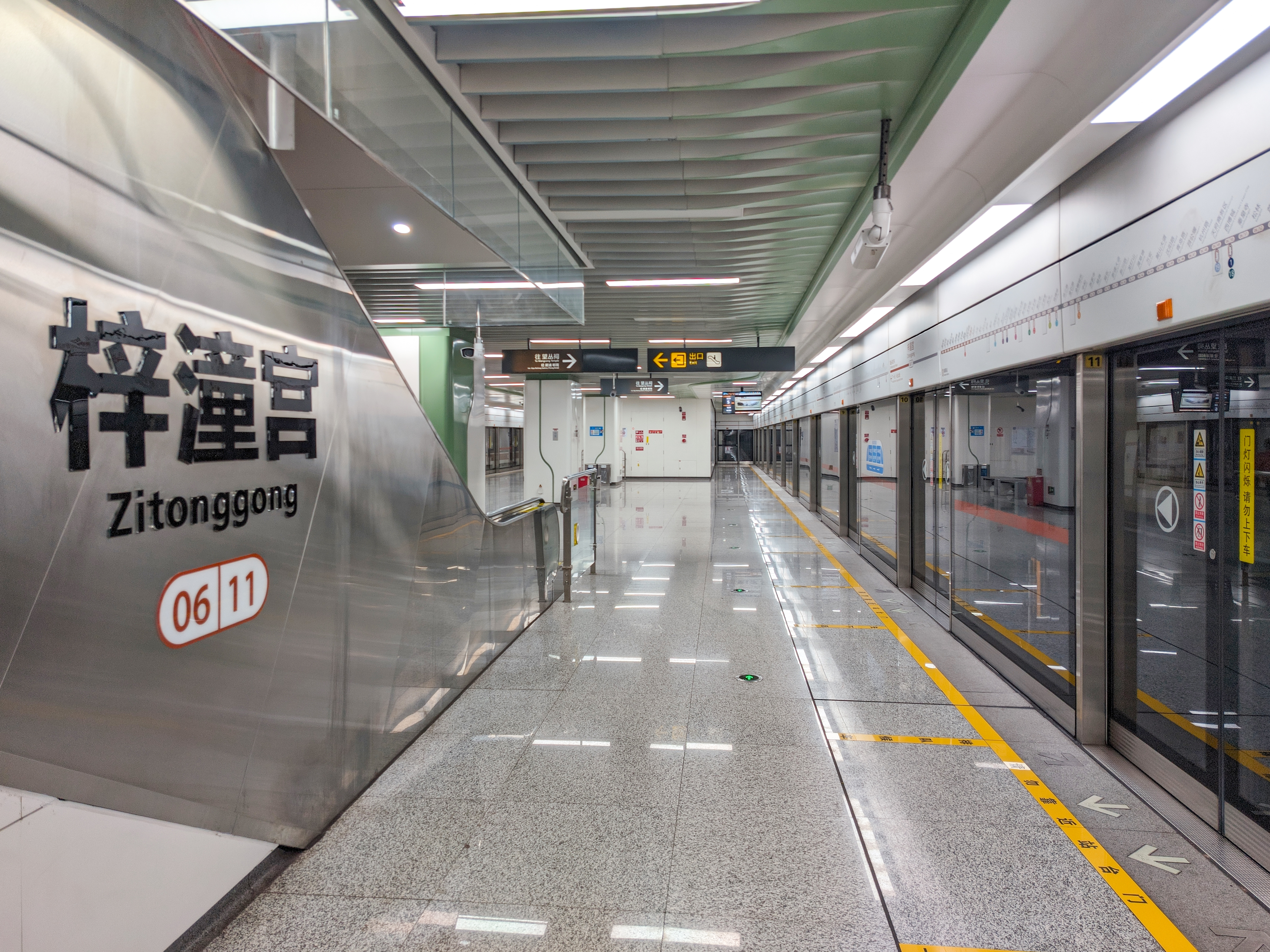

General information
- Location: Pidu District, Chengdu, Sichuan; China
- Coordinates: 30.75031°N 103.9912°E
- Operated by: Chengdu Metro Limited
- Line(s): Line 6
- Platforms: 2 (1 island platform)

Other information
- Station code: 0611

History
- Opened: 18 December 2020

Services
Preceding station	Chengdu Metro	Following station
Southwest Jiaotong University & Xingye North Street towards Wangcong Temple	Line 6	Houjiaqiao towards Lanjiagou
Location

Zitonggong Station is a metro station at Chengdu, Sichuan, China. It opened on December 18, 2020 with the opening of Chengdu Metro Line 6.
