= Shuxin Avenue station =

Metro station in Chengdu, China

Shuxin Avenue 蜀新大道
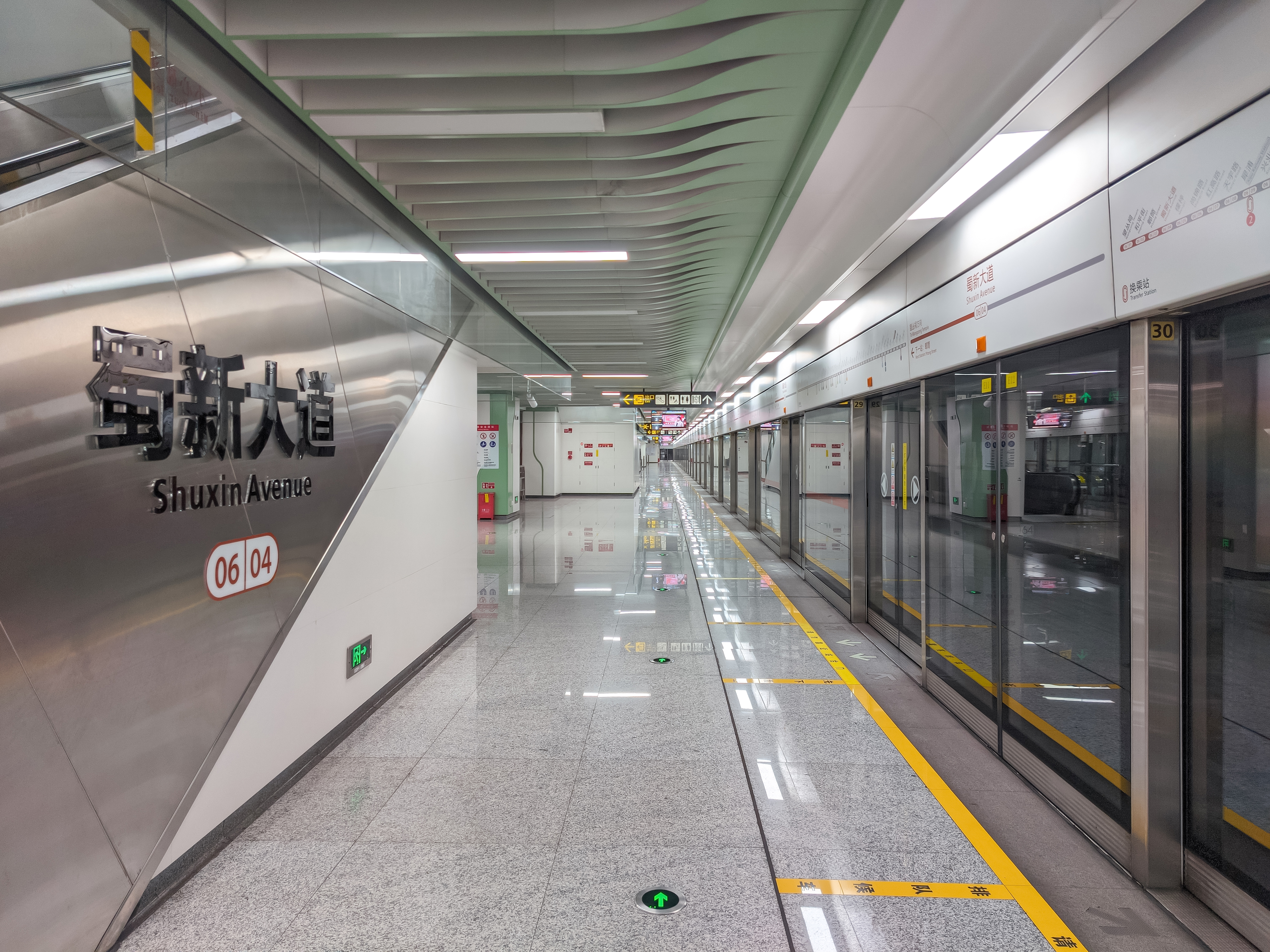

General information
- Location: Pidu District, Chengdu, Sichuan; China
- Coordinates: 30.79380°N 103.90126°E
- Operated by: Chengdu Metro Limited
- Line: Line 6
- Platforms: 2 (1 island platform)

Other information
- Station code: 0604

History
- Opened: 18 December 2020

Services
| Preceding station | Chengdu Metro | Following station |
|---|---|---|
| Pitong Street towards Wangcong Temple | Line 6 | Mengzi towards Lanjiagou |
Location

Shuxin Avenue Station is a metro station at Chengdu, Sichuan, China. It opened on December 18, 2020 with the opening of Chengdu Metro Line 6.

== Station Overview ==
Shuxin Avenue station is located in the Pidu District of Chengdu, in the North and South Avenue and Wang Congzhong Road/West District Avenue intersection to the west about 100m, so the station is located in the West District Avenue and Shuxin Avenue, Wang Congzhong Road intersection and named..Inaugurated on December 18, 2020.
