= Xinchuan Road station =

Metro station in Chengdu, China

Xinchuan Road 新川路
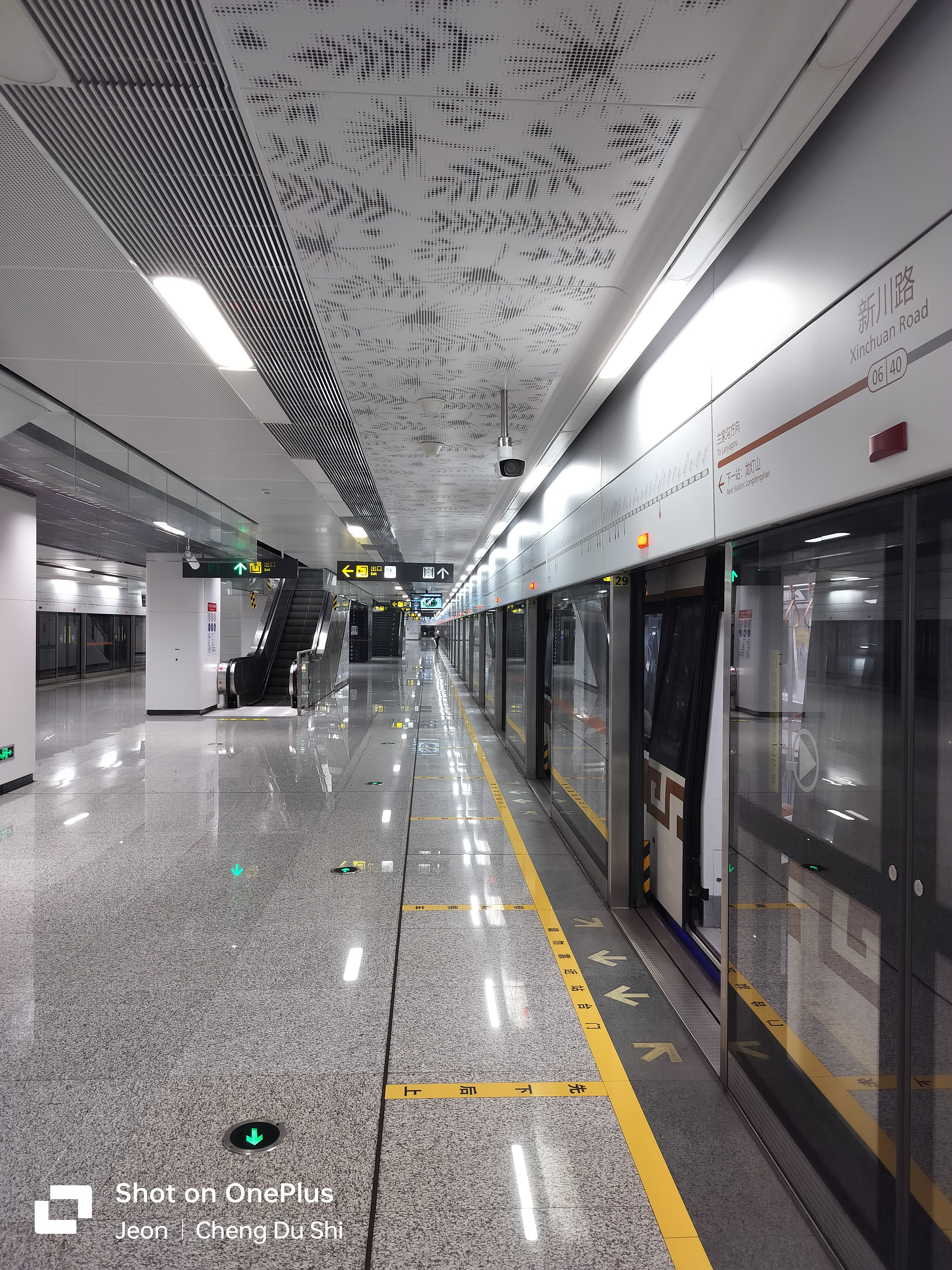

General information
- Location: Shuangliu District, Chengdu, Sichuan; China
- Coordinates: 30.51802°N 104.09805°E
- Operated by: Chengdu Metro Limited
- Line(s): Line 6
- Platforms: 2 (1 island platform)

Other information
- Station code: 0640

History
- Opened: 18 December 2020

Services
Preceding station	Chengdu Metro	Following station
Xintong Avenue towards Wangcong Temple	Line 6	Longdengshan towards Lanjiagou
Location

Xinchuan Road Station is a metro station at Chengdu, Sichuan, China. It opened on December 18, 2020 with the opening of Chengdu Metro Line 6.
