= Changgongyan station =

Metro station in Chengdu, China

Changgongyan 昌公堰
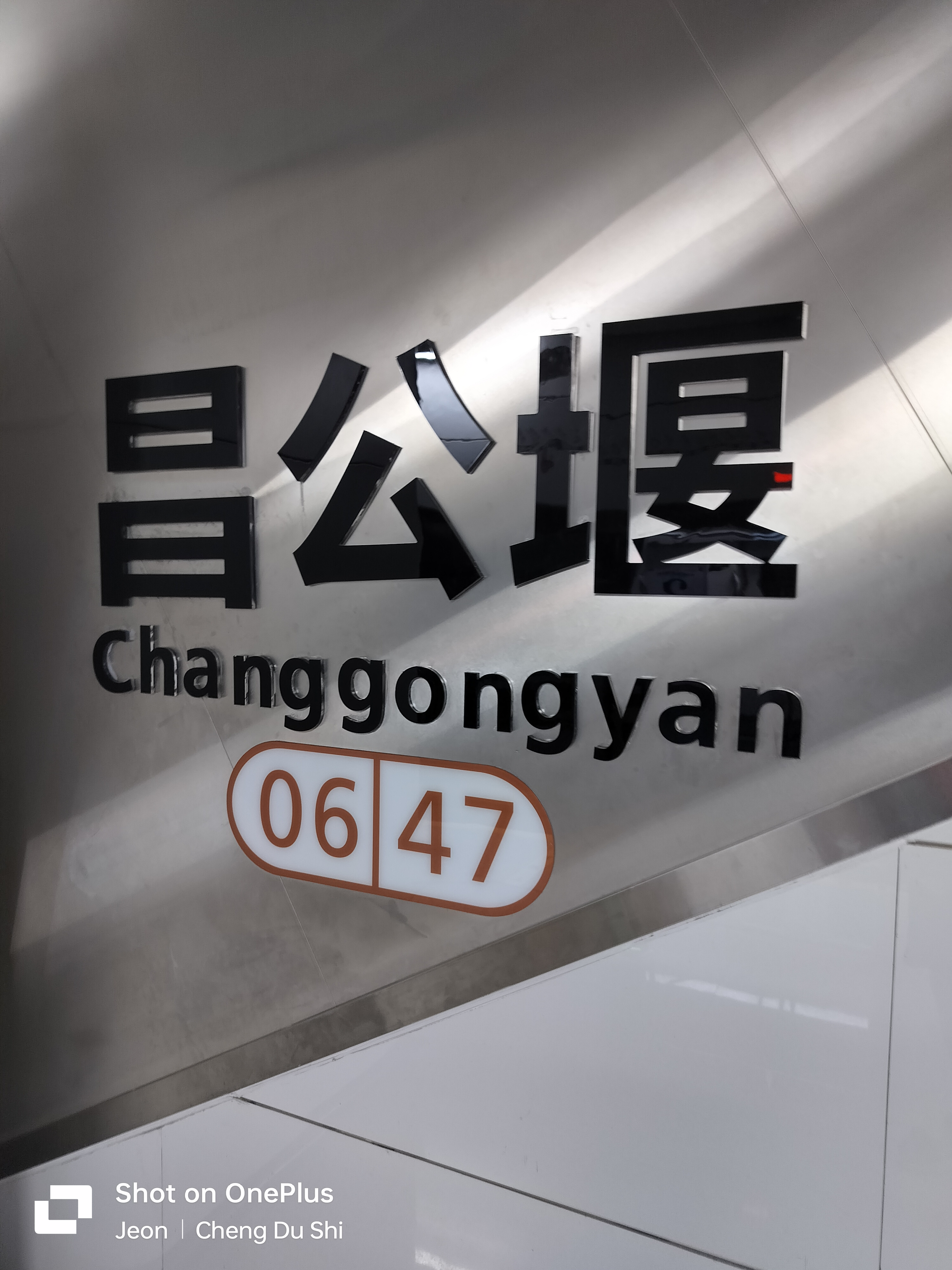

General information
- Location: Shuangliu District, Chengdu, Sichuan; China
- Coordinates: 30.45106°N 104.09212°E
- Operated by: Chengdu Metro Limited
- Line: Line 6
- Platforms: 2 (1 island platform)

Other information
- Station code: 0647

History
- Opened: 18 December 2020

Services
Preceding station	Chengdu Metro	Following station
Qingdao Road towards Wangcong Temple	Line 6	Hangzhou Road towards Lanjiagou
Location

Changgongyan Station is a metro station at Chengdu, Sichuan, China. It opened on December 18, 2020, with the opening of Chengdu Metro Line 6.
