= Qingdao Road station =

Metro station in Chengdu, China

Qingdao Road 青岛路
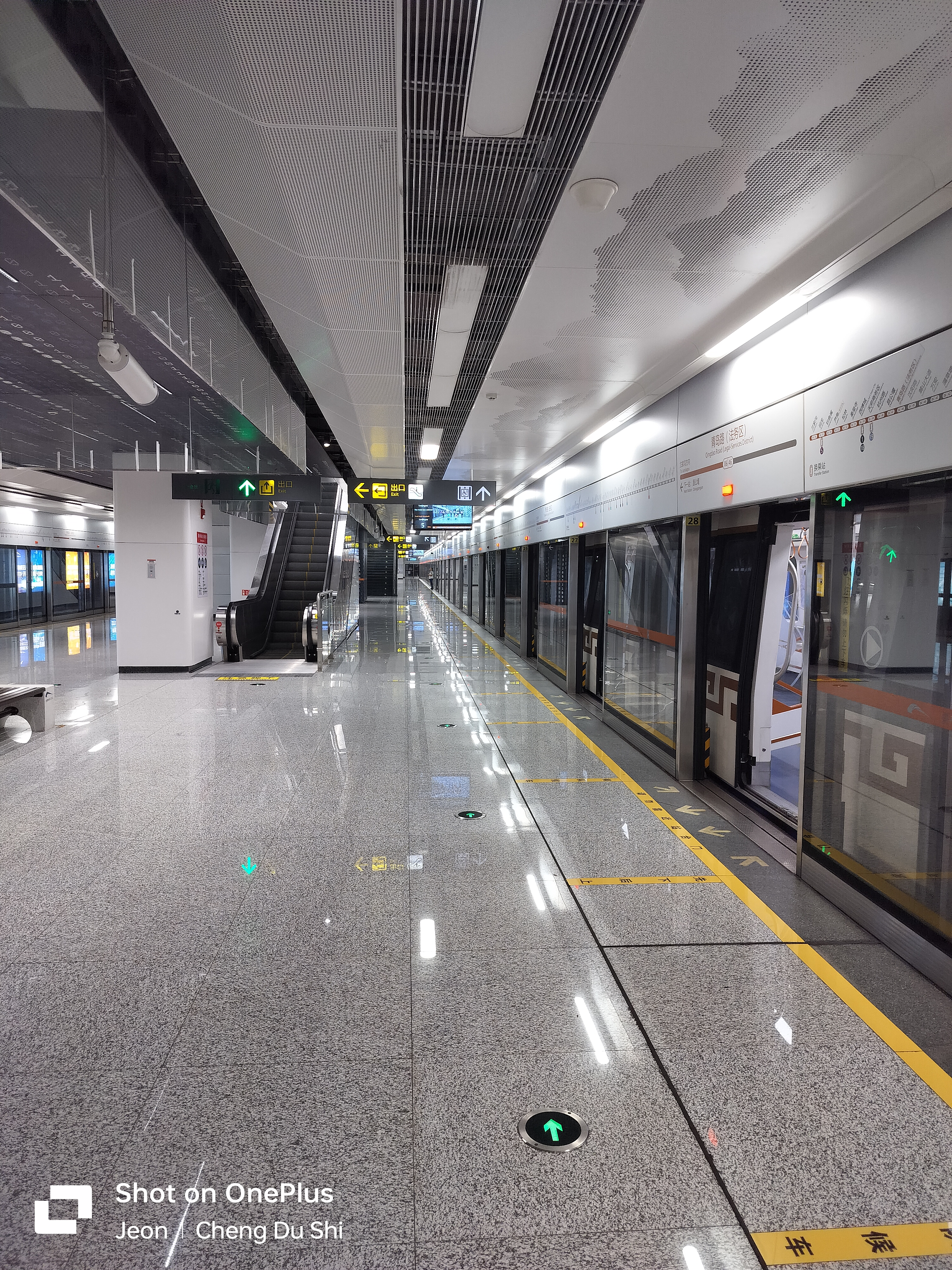

General information
- Location: Shuangliu District, Chengdu, Sichuan; China
- Operated by: Chengdu Metro Limited
- Line: Line 6
- Platforms: 2 (1 island platform)

Other information
- Station code: 0646

History
- Opened: 8 April 2024

Services
Preceding station	Chengdu Metro	Following station
Shenyang Road towards Wangcong Temple	Line 6	Changgongyan towards Lanjiagou
Location

Qingdao Road Station is a metro station on Line 6 of the Chengdu Metro. It was opened on 8 April 2024 as an infill station.

== History ==
The station could not be opened with the rest of Line 6, due to requirements for stations to have at least two accessible entrances and exits, be connected to municipal roads, and be connected to public transportation facilities. Originally, Qingdao Road station had only one entrance and exit that meets traffic conditions and does not meet the conditions for opening such as bus connections.

From 6–8 January 2024, Qingdao Road station carried out a stop and door opening test in preparation for its opening. With the completion of Kuizhou Avenue, the station officially started taking passengers on 8 April 2024.
