= Jinshi Road station =

Metro station in Chengdu, China

Jinshi Road 金石路
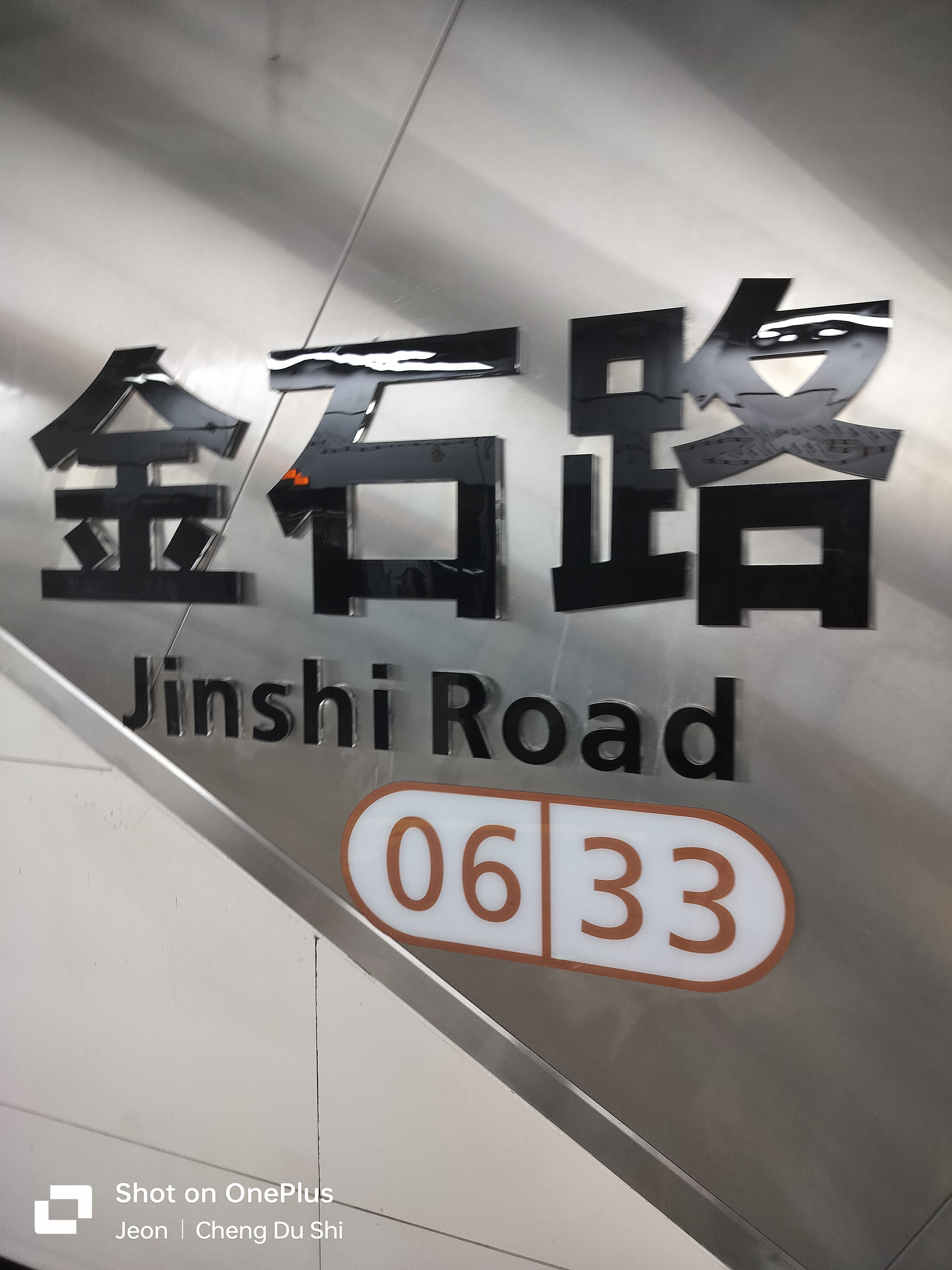

General information
- Location: Jinjiang District, Chengdu, Sichuan; China
- Coordinates: 30.5927°N 104.0866°E
- Operated by: Chengdu Metro Limited
- Lines: Line 6 Line 30
- Platforms: 4 (2 island platforms)

Other information
- Station code: 0633; 3011

History
- Opened: 18 December 2020 (Line 6); 16 December 2025 (Line 30)

Services
Preceding station	Chengdu Metro	Following station
Liusan Road towards Wangcong Temple	Line 6	Financial City East towards Lanjiagou
Juanzishu towards Longquanyi Railway Station South	Line 30	Fucheng Bridge towards East of Terminal 2 of Shuangliu International Airport
Location

Jinshi Road Station is a metro station at Chengdu, Sichuan, China. It opened on December 18, 2020 with the opening of Chengdu Metro Line 6 and December 16, 2025 with the opening of Chengdu Metro Line 30.
