= Tianfu Commercial District station =

Metro station in Chengdu, China

Tianfu Commercial District 天府商务区
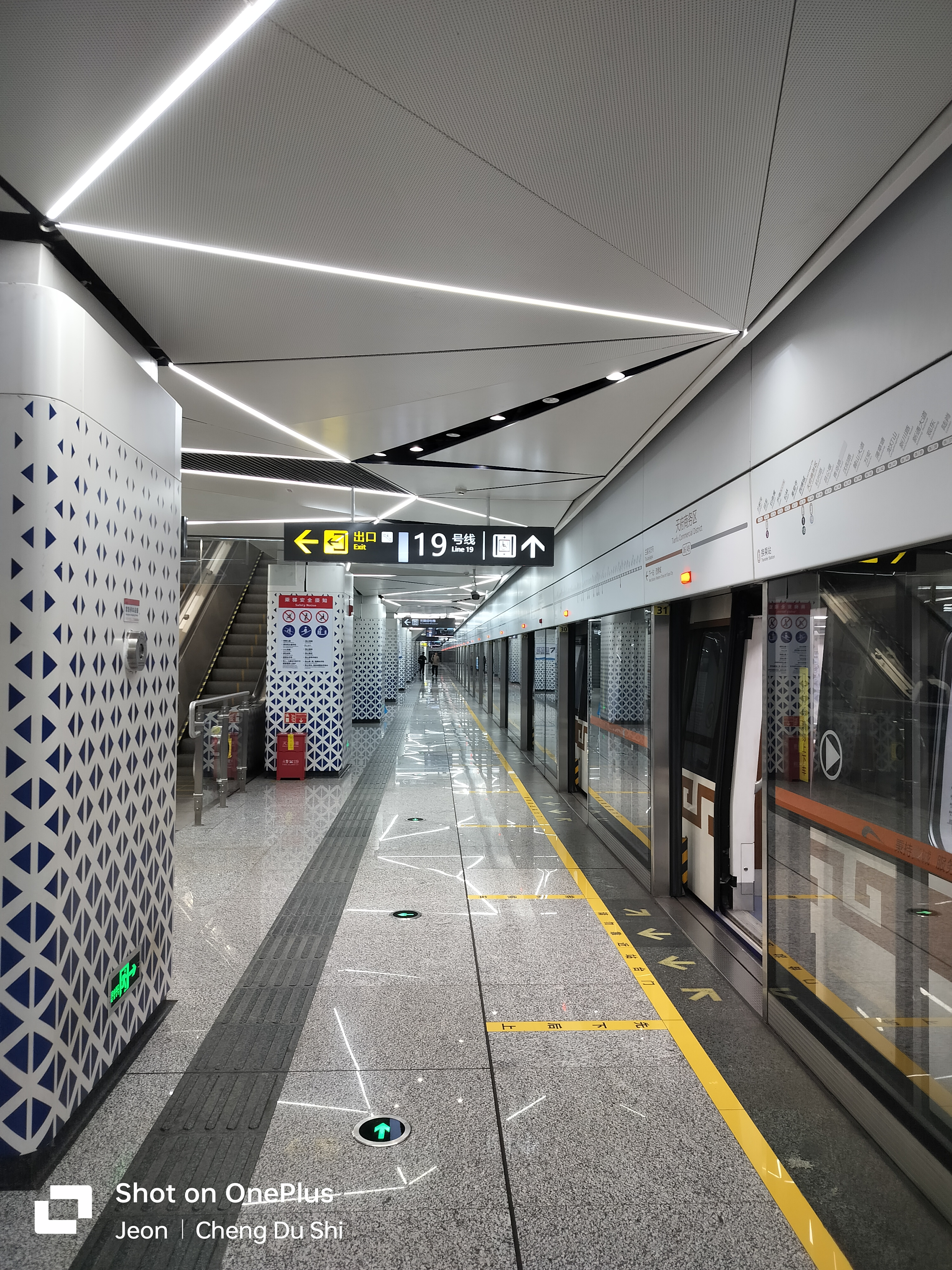
- Line 6 platform

General information
- Location: Shuangliu District, Chengdu, Sichuan; China
- Operated by: Chengdu Metro Limited
- Lines: Line 6 Line 19
- Platforms: 4 (2 island platforms)

Other information
- Station code: 0649 1916

History
- Opened: 18 December 2020

Services
Preceding station	Chengdu Metro	Following station
Hangzhou Road towards Wangcong Temple	Line 6	Western China Int'l Expo City towards Lanjiagou
Honglian towards Jinxing	Line 19	Lanjiadian towards Tianfu Station
Location

Tianfu Commercial District Station is a metro station at Chengdu, Sichuan, China. It was opened on December 18, 2020 for Chengdu Metro Line 6 and November 28, 2023 for Chengdu Metro Line 19.
