= Pitong Street station =

Metro station in Chengdu, China

Pitong Street 郫筒
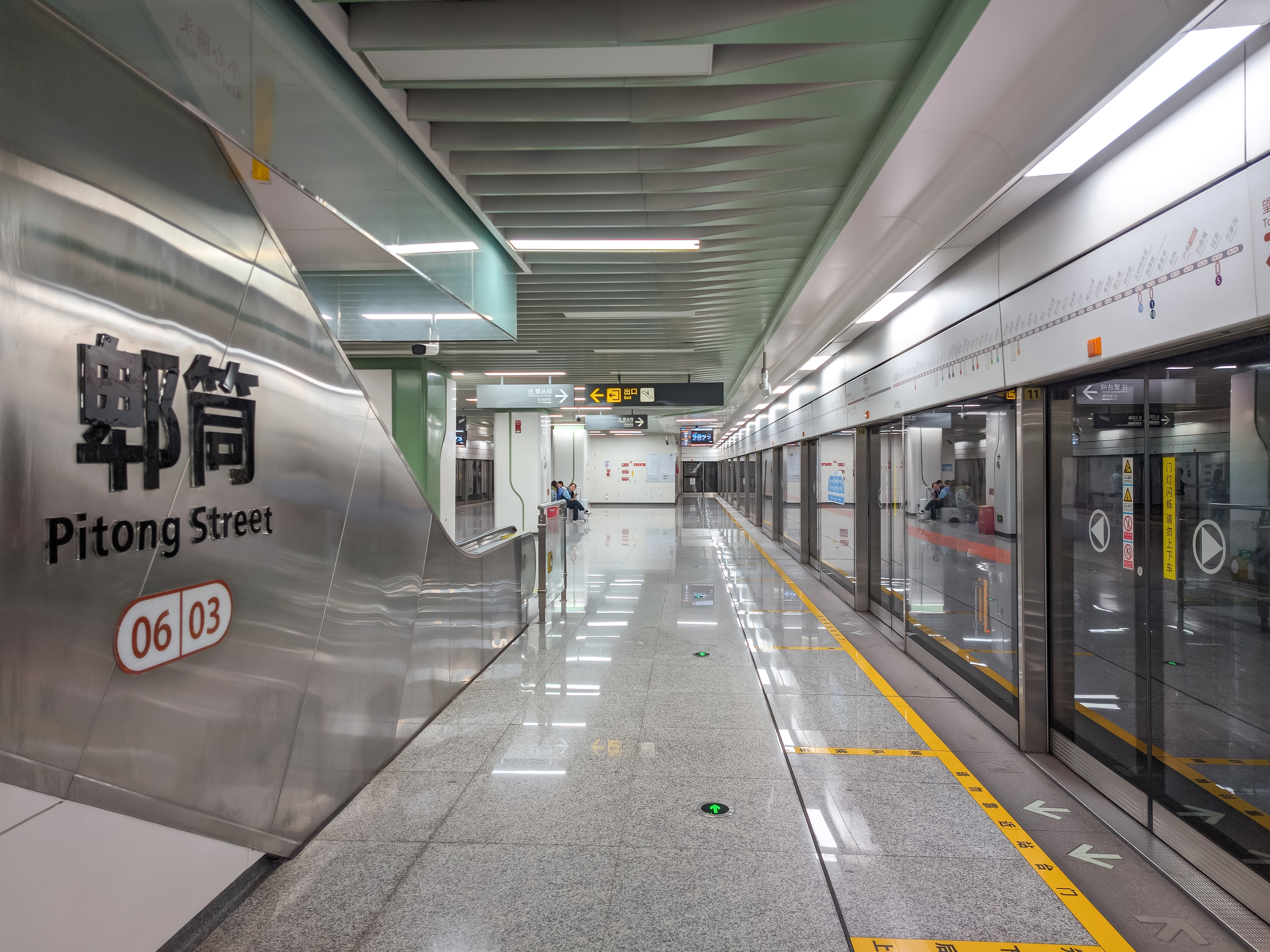

General information
- Location: Pidu District, Chengdu, Sichuan; China
- Operated by: Chengdu Metro Limited
- Line: Line 6
- Platforms: 2 (1 island platform)

Other information
- Station code: 0603

History
- Opened: 18 December 2020

Services
| Preceding station | Chengdu Metro | Following station |
|---|---|---|
| Heping Street towards Wangcong Temple | Line 6 | Shuxin Avenue towards Lanjiagou |
Location

Pitong Street Station is a metro station at Chengdu, Sichuan, China. It opened on December 18, 2020 with the opening of Chengdu Metro Line 6.
