= Zhonghe station =

Zhonghe Station may refer to:

- Zhonghe station (Chengdu) in Chengdu, Sichuan, China
- Zhonghe metro station in New Taipei City, Taiwan
