= Line 6 (Chengdu Metro) =

Line of Chengdu Metro

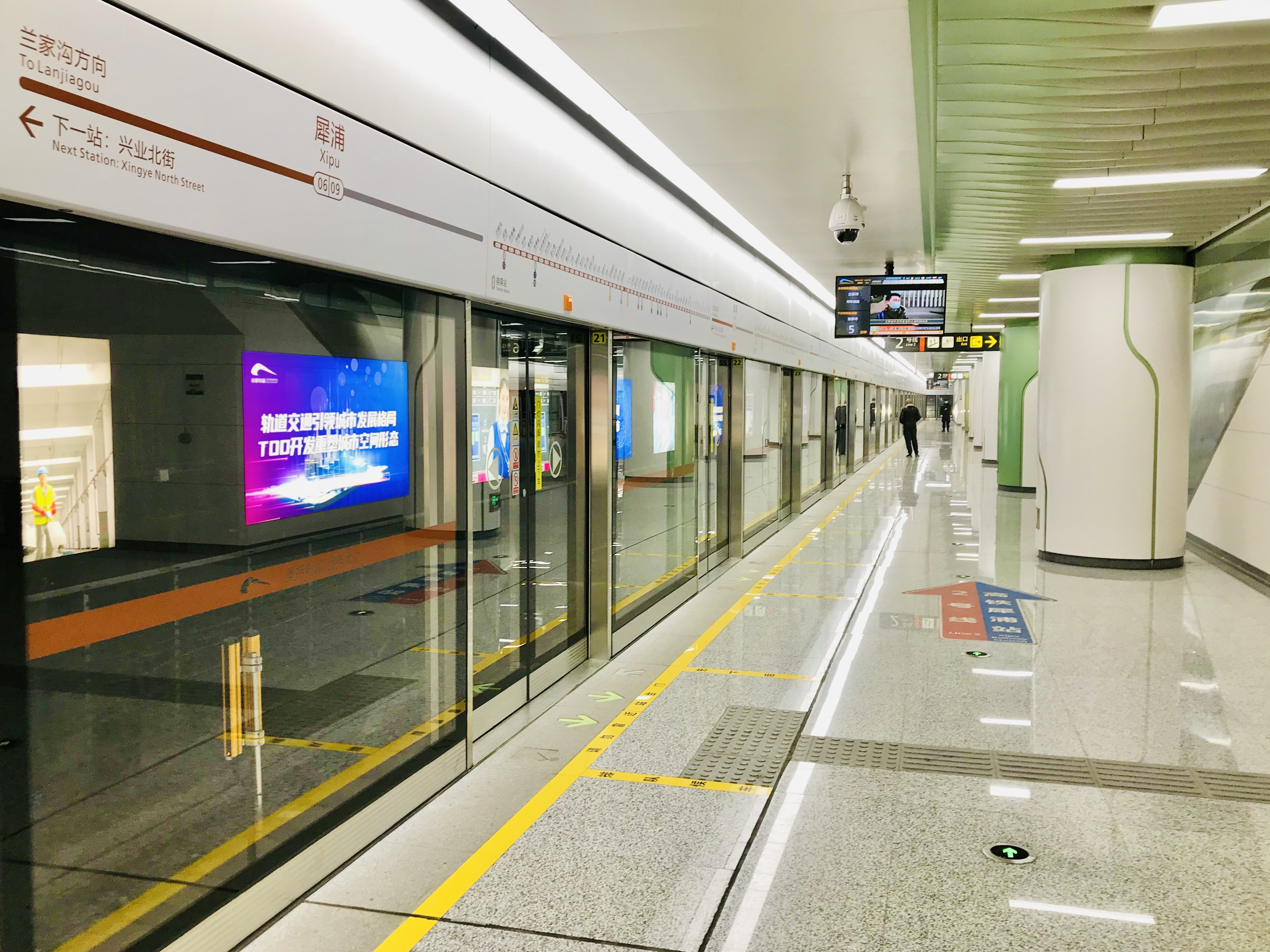
- Line 6 platform at Xipu station

Overview
- Status: Operational
- Owner: Chengdu
- Locale: Chengdu, Sichuan
- Termini: Wangcong Temple; Lanjiagou
- Stations: 56

Service
- Type: Rapid transit
- System: Chengdu Metro
- Operator: Chengdu Metro Corporation

History
- Opened: 18 December 2020; 5 years ago

Technical
- Line length: 68.88 km (42.8 mi)
- Number of tracks: 2
- Character: Underground
- Track gauge: 1,435 mm (4 ft 8 1/2 in)
- Electrification: Overhead lines, 1,500 V DC
- Operating speed: 80 km/h (50 mph)

Line 6 of the Chengdu Metro (Chinese: 成都地铁6号线; pinyin: Chéngdū Dìtiě Liù Hào Xiàn) is a rapid transit line in Chengdu. It starts at Wangcong Temple and ends at Lanjiagou. The total length is 68.88 km (42.8 mi) with 56 stations.

Line 6's color is brown. The line began construction in 2016 and was opened on 18 December 2020. Line 6 uses high capacity 8-car Type A trains. Line 6 became the longest stretch of subway to be opened at once in China, and it is currently the third longest continuous subway tunnel in the world. As of September 2026, Line 6 is the subway line with the most operational stations in China.

== Progress ==
- 2017-03-01, the first tunnel boring machine was launched. 42 TBMs will be used simultaneously for the construction of the line.
- 2019-10-07, tunnel construction completed for Line 6.
- 2020-05-27, as Phase 3 section of Line 6 finishes track-laying, other Phase 1 and 2 sections officially started testing rolling stock.
- 2020-07-01, the last section of Line 6, between Xihua Avenue station and Dongguang station, is powered on, paving the way for dynamic testing.
- 2020-12-18, Line 6 officially opened.
- 2024-04-08, Qingdao Road station opened for service.
- 2025-08-22, Lujiao station opened for service.

== Stations ==
Service routes		Station №	Station name		Transfer	Distance km		Location
Service routes		Station №	English	Chinese	Transfer	Distance km		Location
●	●	0601	Wangcong Temple	望丛祠	T2	--	0.000	Pidu
●	●	0602	Heping Street	和平街		1.185	1.185	Pidu
●	●	0603	Pitong Street	郫筒		0.859	2.044	Pidu
●	●	0604	Shuxin Avenue	蜀新大道		0.994	3.038	Pidu
●	●	0605	Mengzi	檬梓		1.285	4.323	Pidu
●	●	0606	Shangjin Road	尚锦路		1.224	5.547	Pidu
●	●	0607	Honggao Road	红高路		1.540	7.087	Pidu
●	●	0608	Tianyu Road	天宇路		2.435	9.522	Pidu
●	●	0609	Xipu Railway Station	犀浦	2 XIW	1.869	11.391	Pidu
●	●	0610	Xingye North Street	兴业北街	T2 branch (Xipu Campus, Southwest Jiaotong University)	1.582	12.973	Pidu
●	●	0611	Zitonggong	梓潼宫		1.535	14.508	Pidu
●	●	0612	Houjiaqiao	侯家桥		1.658	16.166	Jinniu
●	●	0613	Xingsheng	兴盛		1.888	18.054	Jinniu
●	●	0614	Qinggang	青杠		0.725	18.779	Jinniu
●	●	0615	Xihua Avenue	西华大道		0.936	19.715	Jinniu
●	●	0616	Jinfu	金府	27	1.016	20.731	Jinniu
●	●	0617	Xinghe	星河		1.150	21.881	Jinniu
●	●	0618	Southwest Jiaotong University	西南交大	7 Chengdu BRT	0.905	22.786	Jinniu
●	●	0619	Shawan	沙湾		0.726	23.512	Jinniu
●	●	0620	Xibei Bridge	西北桥	5	0.933	24.445	Jinniu
●	●	0621	Renmin North Road	人民北路	1	1.331	25.776	Jinniu
●	●	0622	Liangjiaxiang	梁家巷		1.198	26.974	Jinniu
●	●	0623	Qianfeng Road	前锋路	3	1.033	28.007	Chenghua
●	●	0624	Jianshe North Road	建设北路	17	0.955	28.962	Chenghua
●	●	0625	Xinhong Road	新鸿路		0.936	29.898	Chenghua
●	●	0626	Yushuang Road	玉双路	4	1.114	31.012	Chenghua
●	●	0627	Niuwangmiao	牛王庙	2	1.190	32.202	Jinjiang
●	●	0628	Shunjiang Road	顺江路		1.134	33.336	Jinjiang
●	●	0629	Sanguantang	三官堂	13	0.779	34.115	Jinjiang
●	●	0630	Dongguang	东光	8	1.139	35.254	Jinjiang
●	●	0631	Liulichang	琉璃场	7	1.320	36.574	Jinjiang
●	●	0632	Liusan Road	琉三路		0.819	37.393	Jinjiang
●	●	0633	Jinshi Road	金石路	30	1.584	38.977	Jinjiang
●	●	0634	Financial City East	金融城东	9	1.380	40.357	Jinjiang
●	●	0635	Zhonghe	中和		2.832	43.189	Shuangliu (S. High-Tech Zone)
●	●	0636	Zhangjiasi	张家寺		1.022	44.211	Shuangliu (S. High-Tech Zone)
●	●	0637	Luxiao	陆肖		1.332	45.543	Shuangliu (S. High-Tech Zone)
●	●	0638	Guandong	观东		0.786	46.329	Shuangliu (S. High-Tech Zone)
●	●	0639	Xintong Avenue	新通大道		1.000	47.329	Shuangliu (S. High-Tech Zone)
●	●	0640	Xinchuan Road	新川路		0.763	48.092	Shuangliu (S. High-Tech Zone)
●	●	0641	Longdengshan	龙灯山		0.767	48.859	Shuangliu (S. High-Tech Zone)
●	●	0642	Pucaotang	蒲草塘		0.915	49.774	Shuangliu (S. High-Tech Zone)
●	●	0643	Wan'an	万安		0.762	50.536	Shuangliu (Tianfu New Area)
●	●	0644	Lushan Avenue	麓山大道		1.360	51.896	Shuangliu (Tianfu New Area)
●	●	0645	Shenyang Road	沈阳路		1.794	53.690	Shuangliu (Tianfu New Area)
●		0646	Qingdao Road	青岛路		0.985	54.675	Shuangliu (Tianfu New Area)
●		0647	Changgongyan	昌公堰		1.477	56.152	Shuangliu (Tianfu New Area)
●		0648	Hangzhou Road	杭州路		1.206	57.358	Shuangliu (Tianfu New Area)
●		0649	Tianfu Commercial District	天府商务区	19	1.075	58.433	Shuangliu (Tianfu New Area)
●		0650	Western China Int'l Expo City	西博城	1 18	1.278	59.711	Shuangliu (Tianfu New Area)
●		0651	Qinhuangsi	秦皇寺	S5	1.332	61.043	Shuangliu (Tianfu New Area)
●		0652	Songlin	松林		1.480	62.523	Shuangliu (Tianfu New Area)
●		0653	Lujiao	芦角		1.065	63.588	Shuangliu (Tianfu New Area)
●		0654	Diaoyuzui	钓鱼嘴		1.824	64.347	Shuangliu (Tianfu New Area)
●		0655	Huilong	回龙	5	2.151	66.498	Shuangliu (Tianfu New Area)
●		0656	Lanjiagou	兰家沟		1.719	68.217	Shuangliu

== See also ==
- Chengdu Metro
- Chengdu
- Urban rail transit in China
