= Wangcong Temple station =

Metro station and tram stop in Chengdu, China

Wangcong Temple 望丛祠
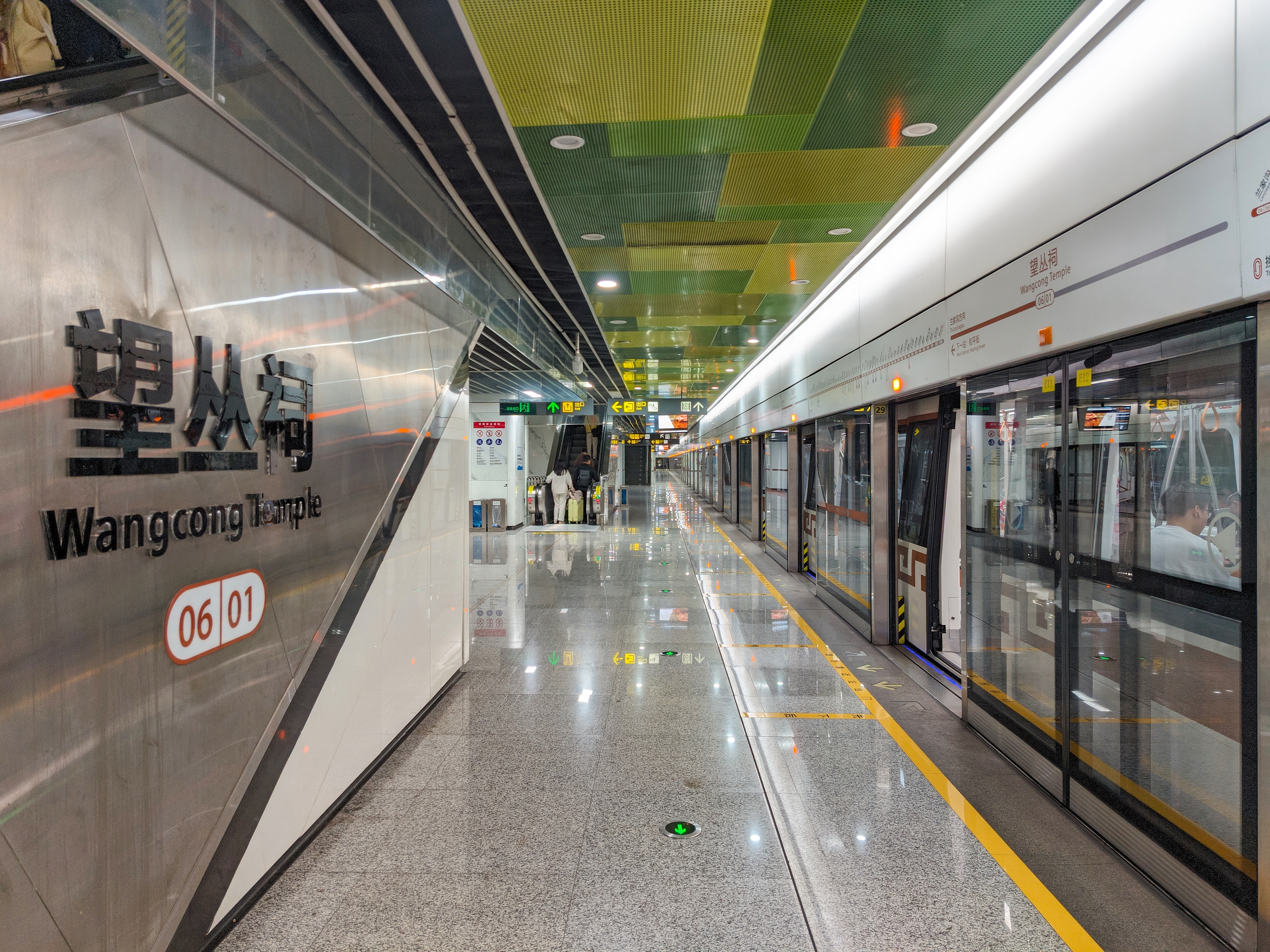
- Platform

General information
- Location: Wangcong Road Middle; Pidu District, Chengdu, Sichuan; China
- Coordinates: 30°48′36″N 103°52′33″E
- Operated by: Chengdu Metro Limited
- Line: Line 6
- Platforms: 2 (1 island platform)

Other information
- Station code: 0601

History
- Opened: 18 December 2020

Services
Preceding station	Chengdu Metro	Following station
Terminus	Line 6	Heping Street towards Lanjiagou
Location

Wangcong Temple Station is a metro station at Chengdu, Sichuan, China. It opened on December 18, 2020, with the opening of Chengdu Metro Line 6.
