= Chunxi Road station =

Metro station in Chengdu, China

Chunxi Road 春熙路
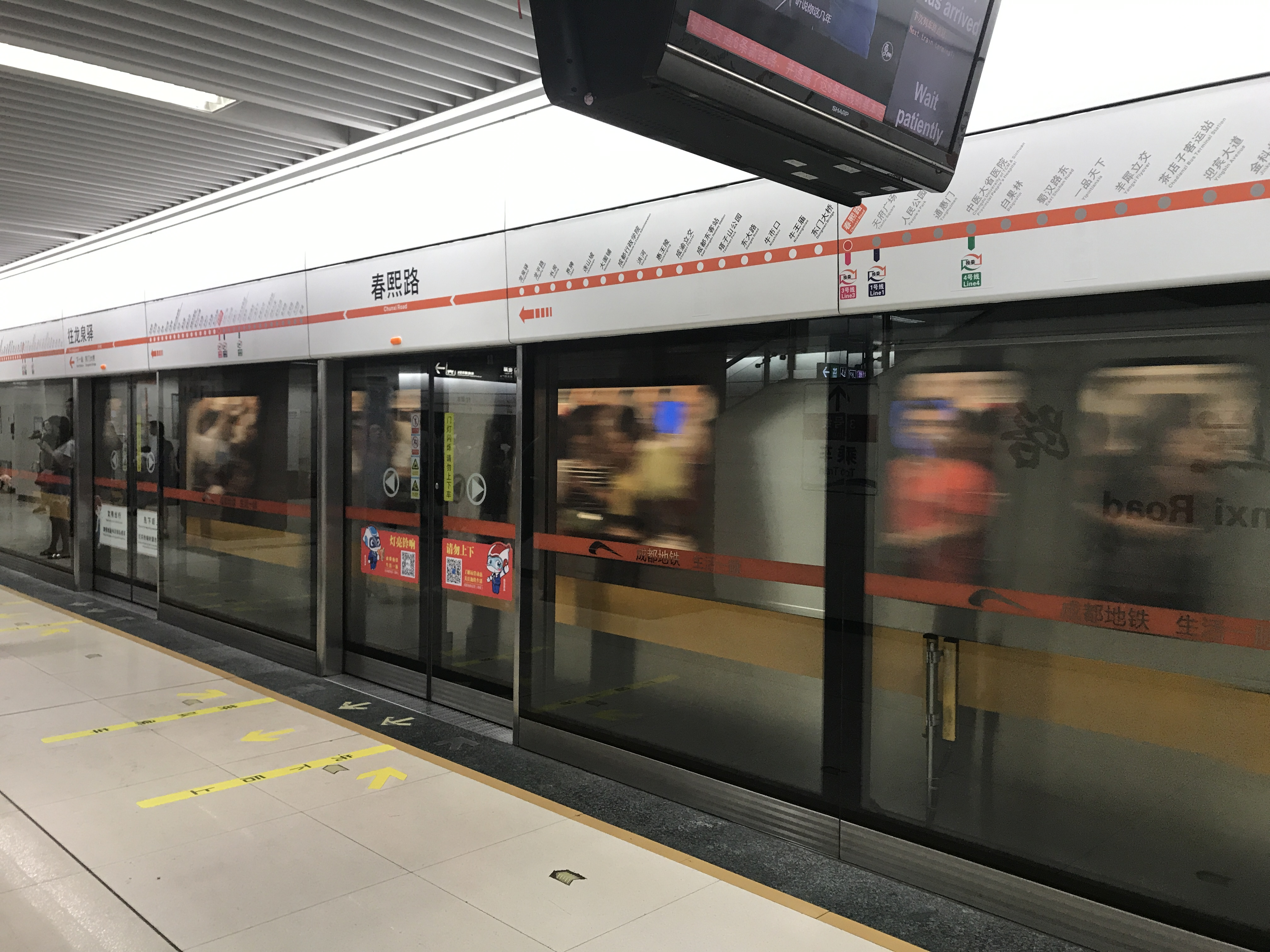

General information
- Location: Jinjiang District, Chengdu, Sichuan; China
- Coordinates: 30.65584°N 104.07707°E
- Operated by: Chengdu Metro Limited
- Line(s): Line 2 Line 3
- Platforms: 4 (2 island platforms)

Other information
- Station code: 0217 0319

History
- Opened: 16 September 2012

Services
Preceding station	Chengdu Metro	Following station
Dongmen Bridge towards Longquanyi	Line 2	Tianfu Square towards Xipu Railway Station
Chengdu Second People's Hospital towards Chengdu Medical College	Line 3	Xinnanmen towards Shuangliu West Railway Station

Chunxi Road (Chinese: 春熙路) is a transfer station on Line 2 and Line 3 of the Chengdu Metro in China.

== Station layout ==
G	Entrances and Exits	Exits A-E
B1	Concourse	Faregates, Station Agent
B2	Northbound	← Line 3 towards Chengdu Medical College (Chengdu Second People's Hospital)
B2	Island platform, doors open on the left
B2	Southbound	Line 3 towards Shuangliu West Station (Xinnanmen) →
B3	Westbound	← Line 2 towards Xipu (Tianfu Square)
B3	Island platform, doors open on the left
B3	Eastbound	Line 2 towards Longquanyi (Dongmen Bridge) →

== Gallery ==
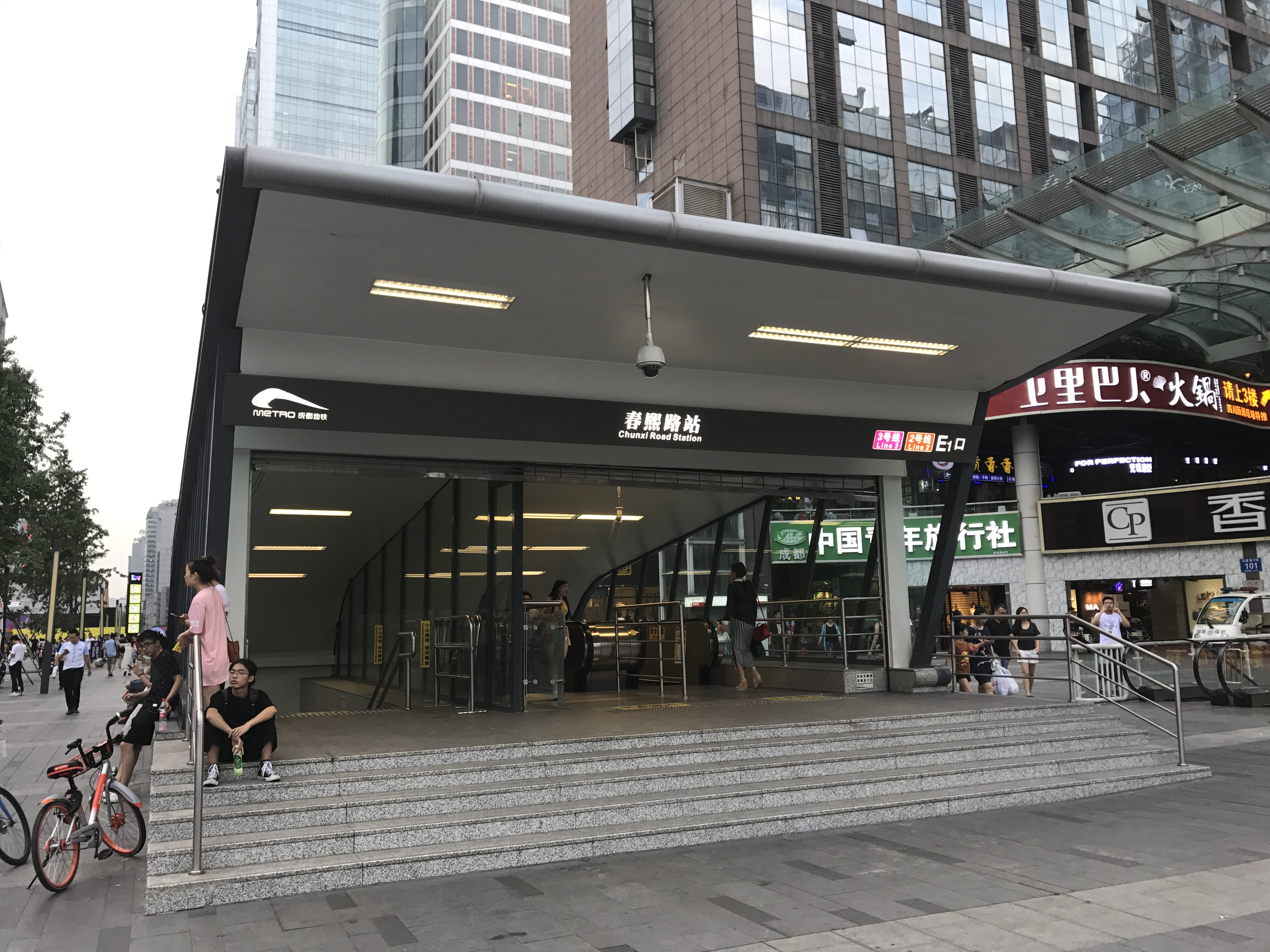
Entrance E1

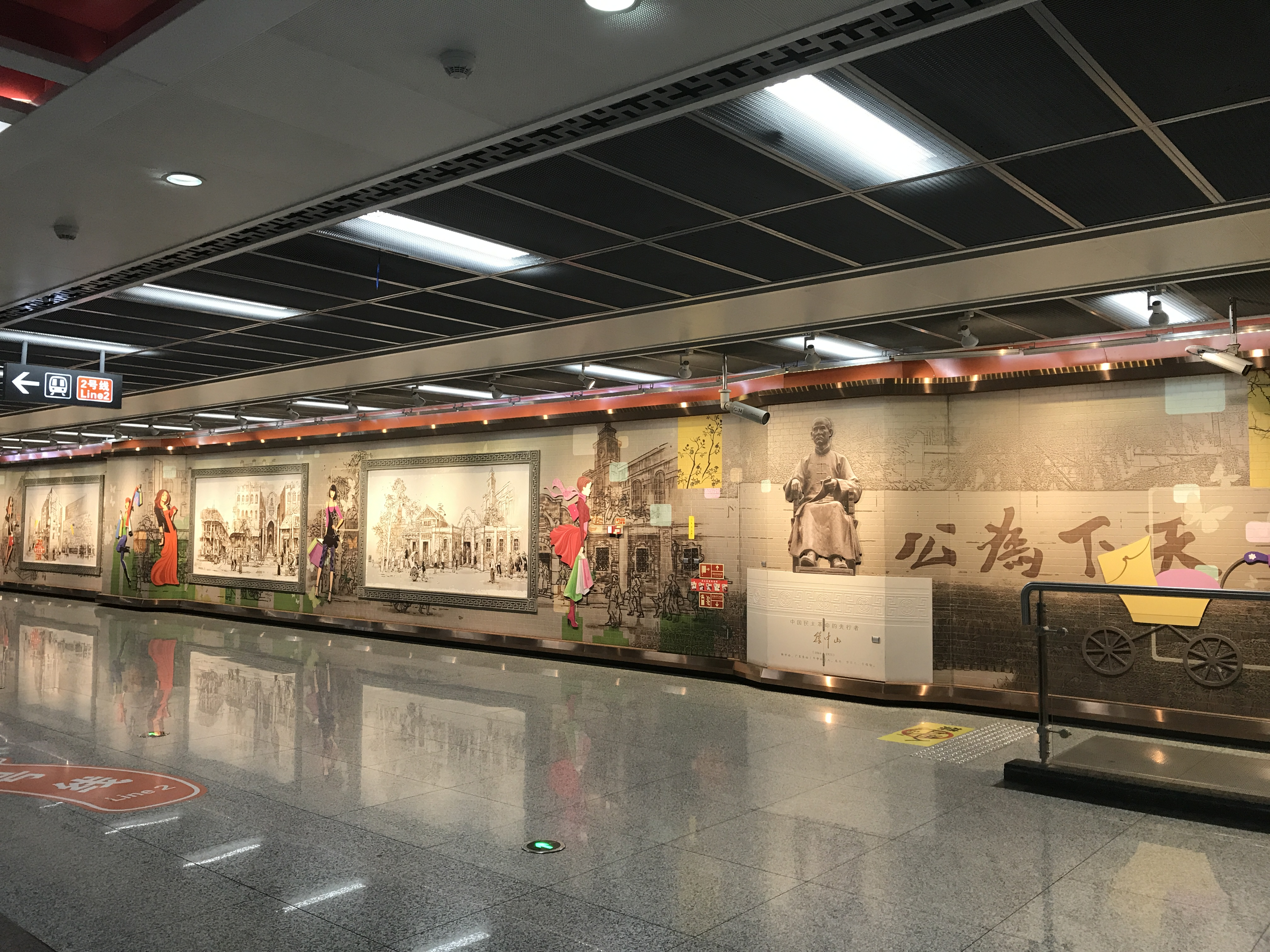
Concourse

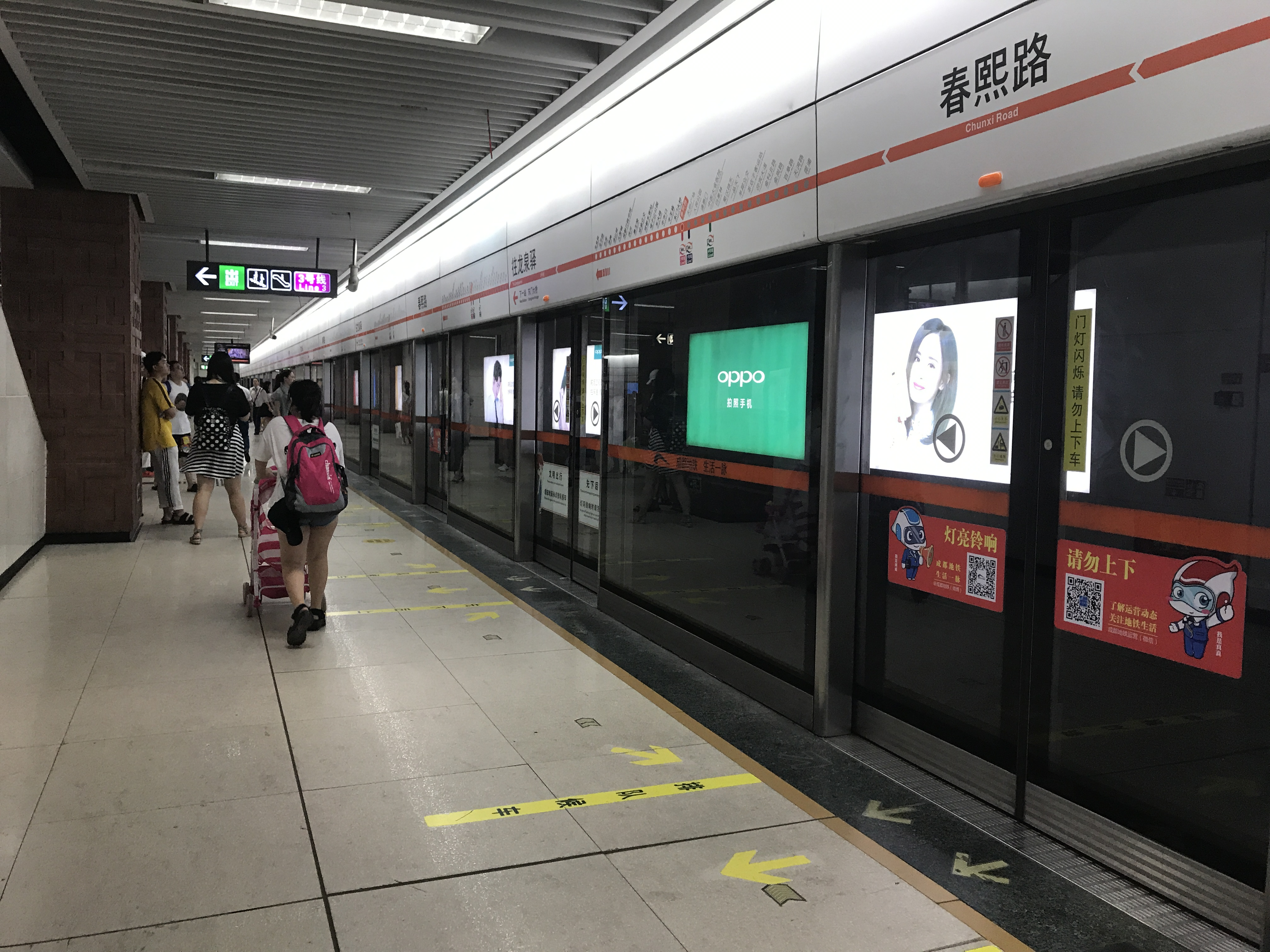
Line 2 platform

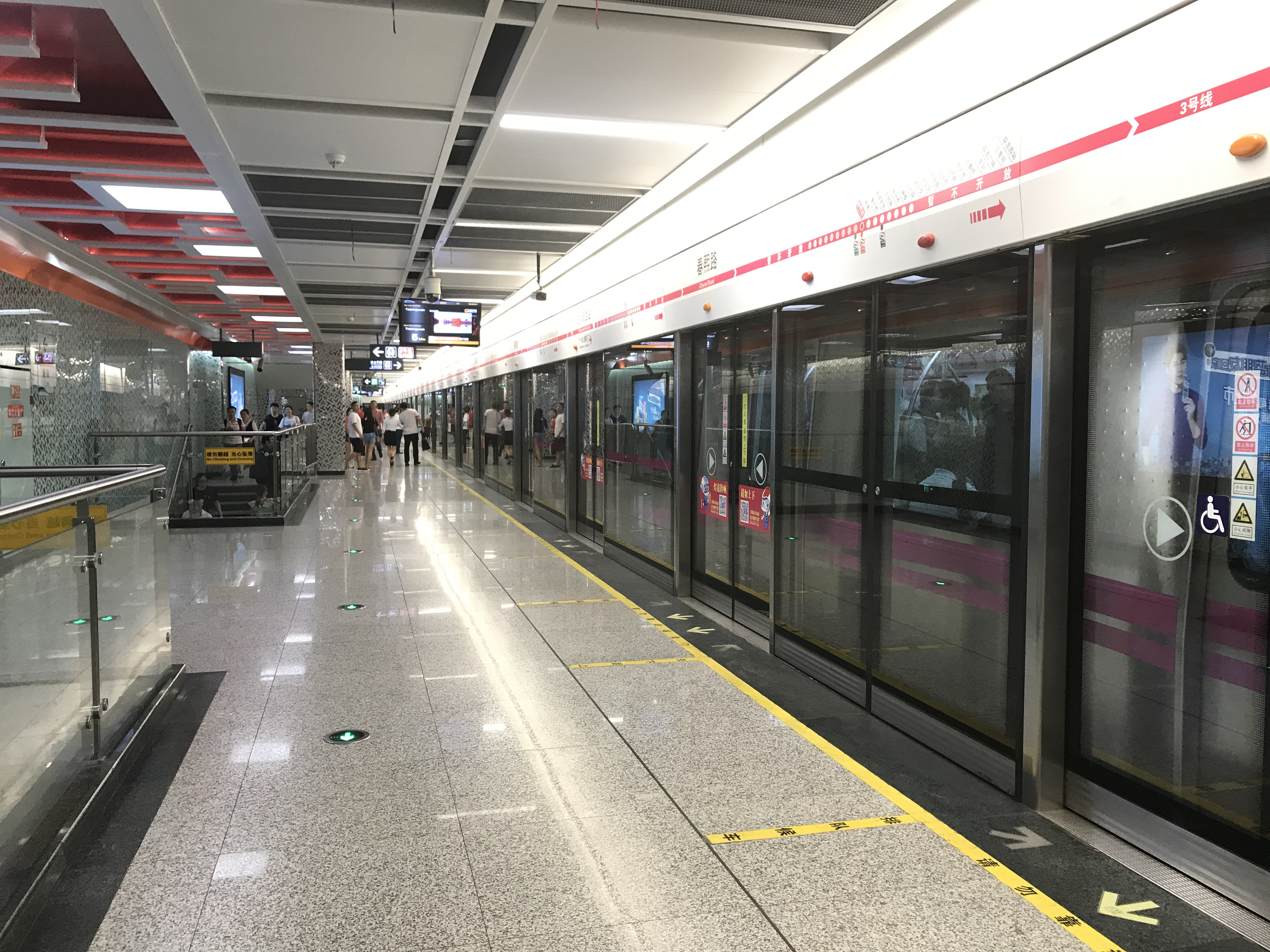
Line 3 platform
