= Dongmen Bridge station =

Station of Chengdu Metro

Dongmen Bridge 东门大桥
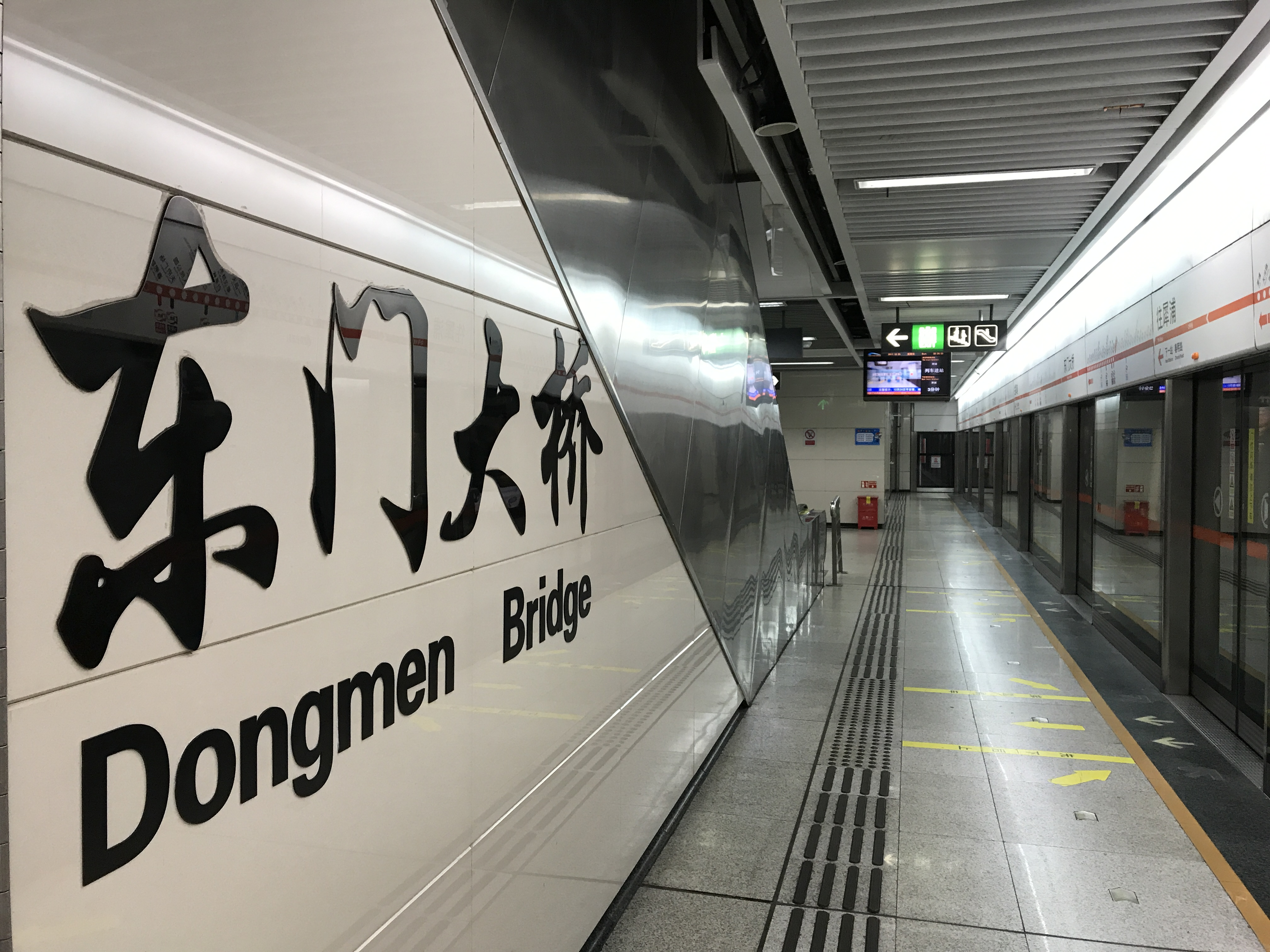

General information
- Location: Jinjiang District, Chengdu, Sichuan; China
- Coordinates: 30.66271°N 104.05406°E
- Operated by: Chengdu Metro Limited
- Line: Line 2
- Platforms: 2 (1 island platform)

Other information
- Station code: 0216

History
- Opened: 16 September 2012

Services
Preceding station	Chengdu Metro	Following station
Niuwangmiao towards Longquanyi	Line 2	Chunxi Road towards Xipu Railway Station
Location

Dongmen Bridge (Chinese: 东门大桥) is a station on Line 2 of the Chengdu Metro in China.

== Station layout ==
G	Entrances and Exits	Exits A-D
B1	Shops
B2	Concourse	Faregates, Station Agent
B3	Westbound	← Line 2 towards Xipu (Chunxi Road)
B3	Island platform, doors open on the left
B3	Eastbound	Line 2 towards Longquanyi (Niuwangmiao) →

== Gallery ==
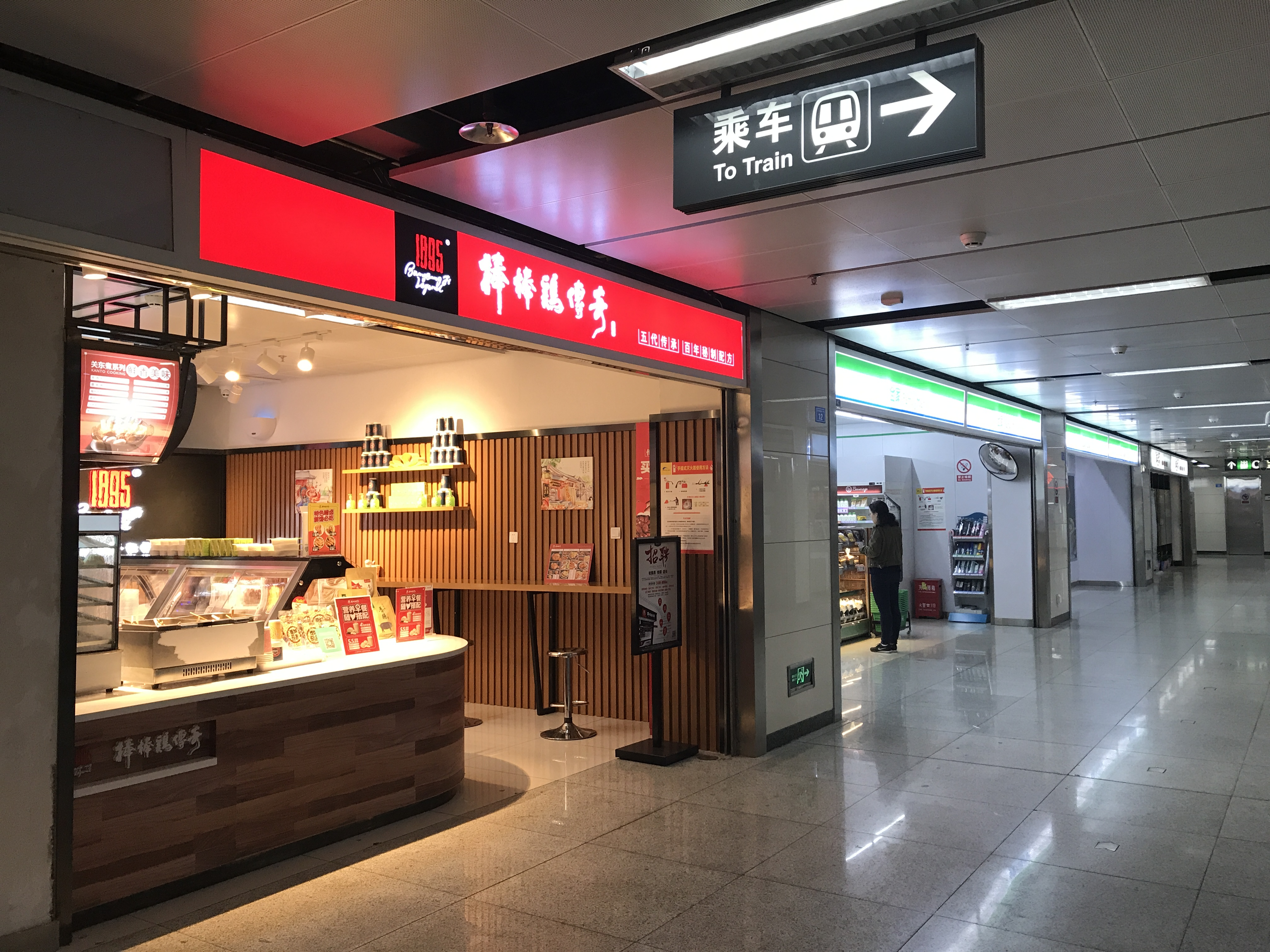
Shops

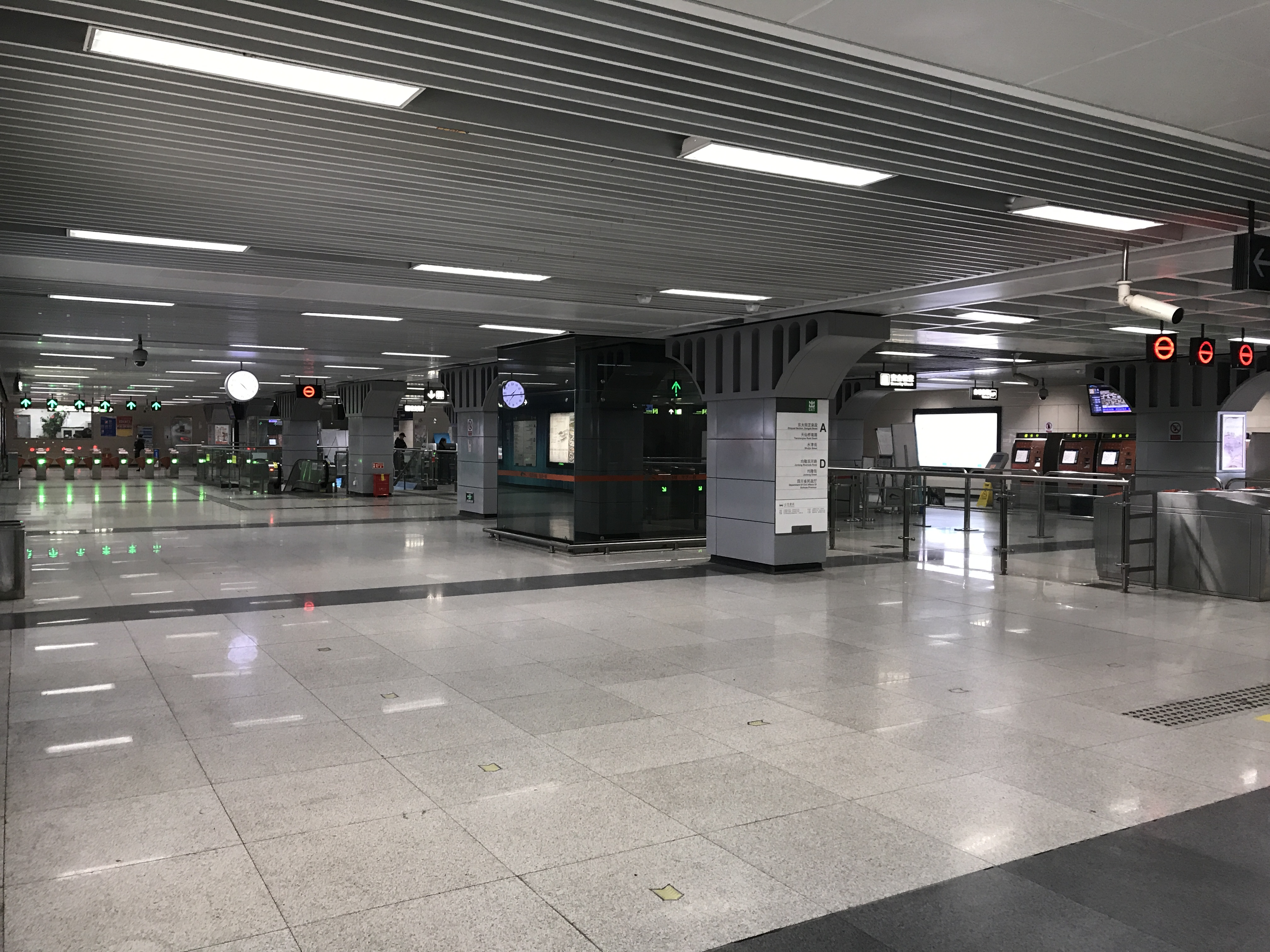
Concourse

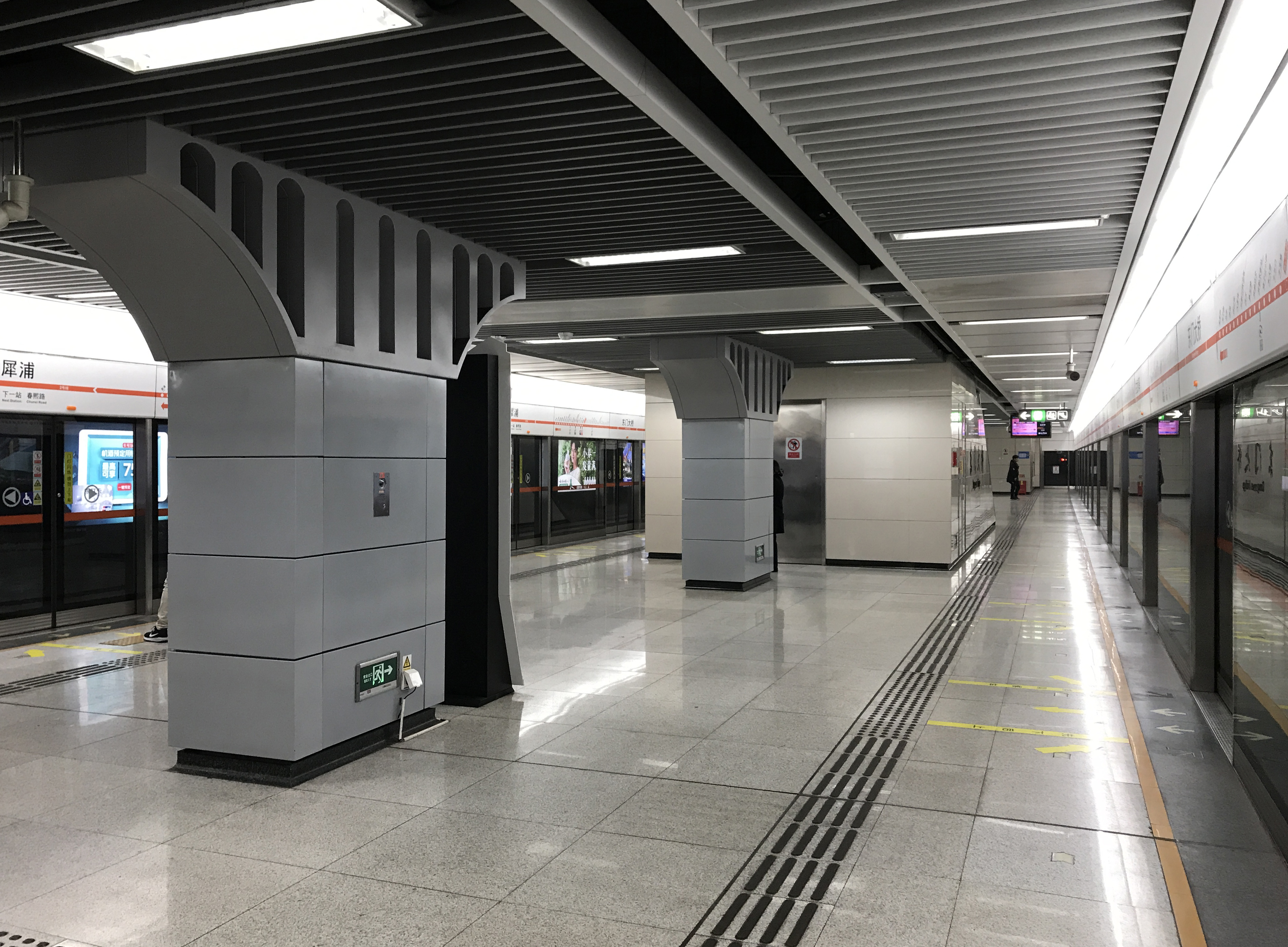
Platform
