= Qianfeng Road station =

Metro station in Chengdu, China

Qianfeng Road 前锋路
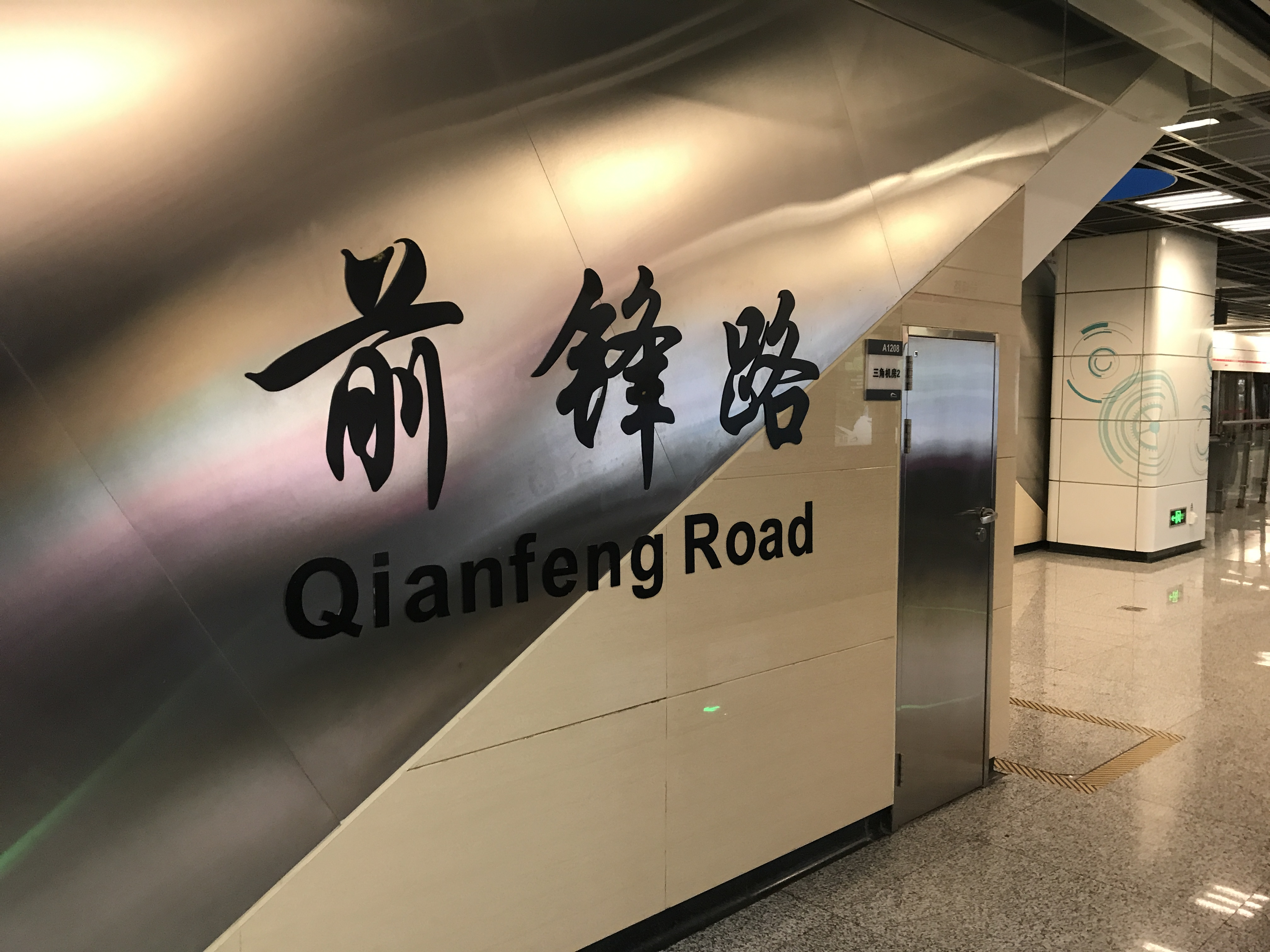

General information
- Location: Chenghua District, Chengdu, Sichuan; China
- Coordinates: 30.68074°N 104.08922°E
- Operated by: Chengdu Metro Limited
- Line(s): Line 3 Line 6
- Platforms: 4 (2 island platforms)

Other information
- Station code: 0316 0623

History
- Opened: 31 July 2016

Services
Preceding station	Chengdu Metro	Following station
Lijiatuo towards Chengdu Medical College	Line 3	Hongxing Bridge towards Shuangliu West Railway Station
Liangjiaxiang towards Wangcong Temple	Line 6	University of Electronic Science and Technology of China & Jianshe North Road towards Lanjiagou

Qianfeng Road (Chinese: 前锋路) is a station on Line 3 and Line 6 of the Chengdu Metro in China.

== Station layout ==
G	Entrances and Exits	Exits A-G
B1	Concourse	Faregates, Station Agent
B2	Northbound	← Line 3 towards Chengdu Medical College (Lijiatuo)
B2	Island platform, doors open on the left
B2	Southbound	Line 3 towards Shuangliu West Railway Station (Hongxing Bridge) →
B3	Northbound	← Line 6 to Wangcong Temple (Liangjiaxiang)
B3	Island platform, doors open on the left
B3	Southbound	Line 6 to Lanjiagou (University of Electronic Science and Technology of China & Jianshe North Road) →

== Gallery ==
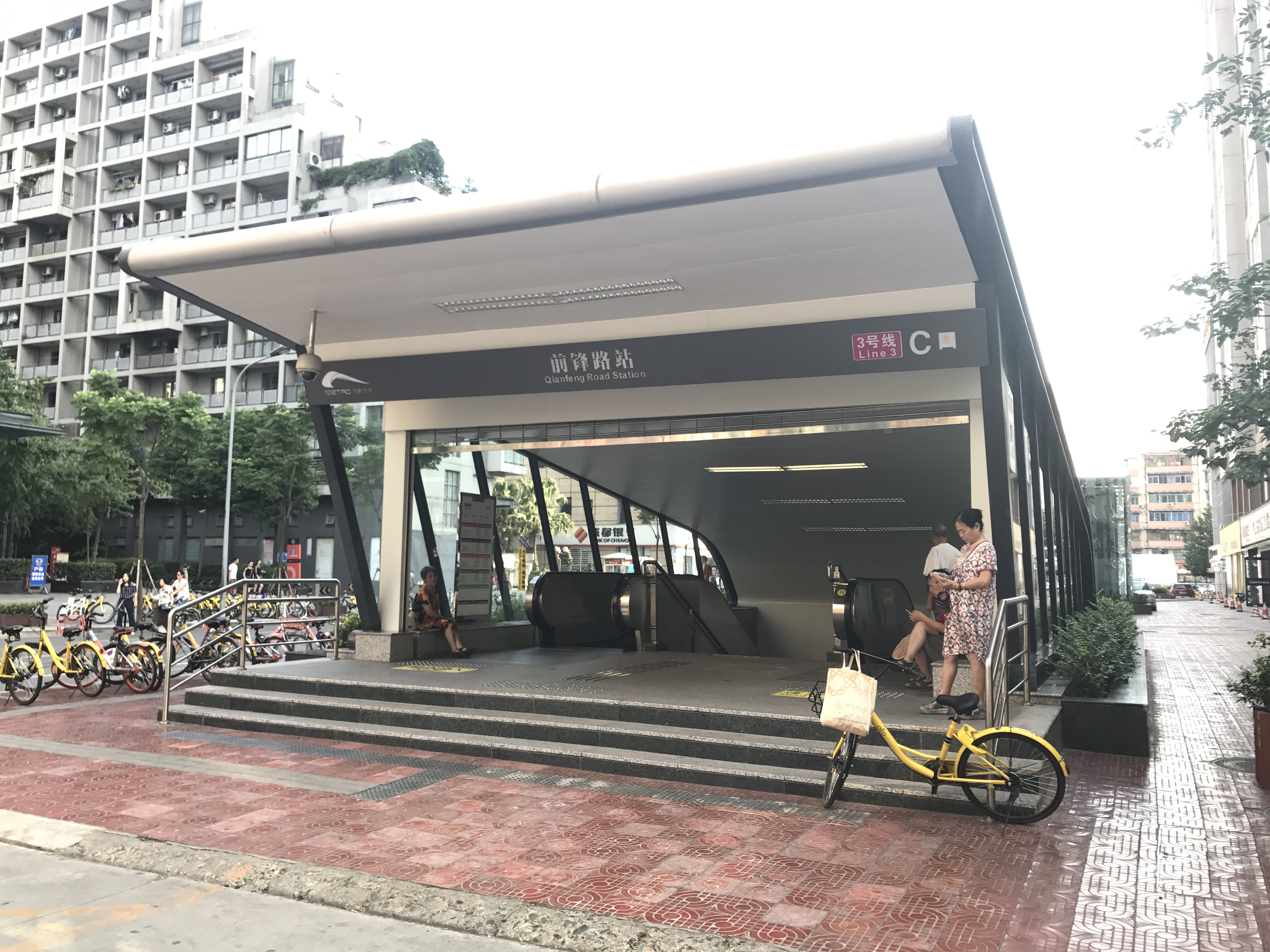
Entrance C

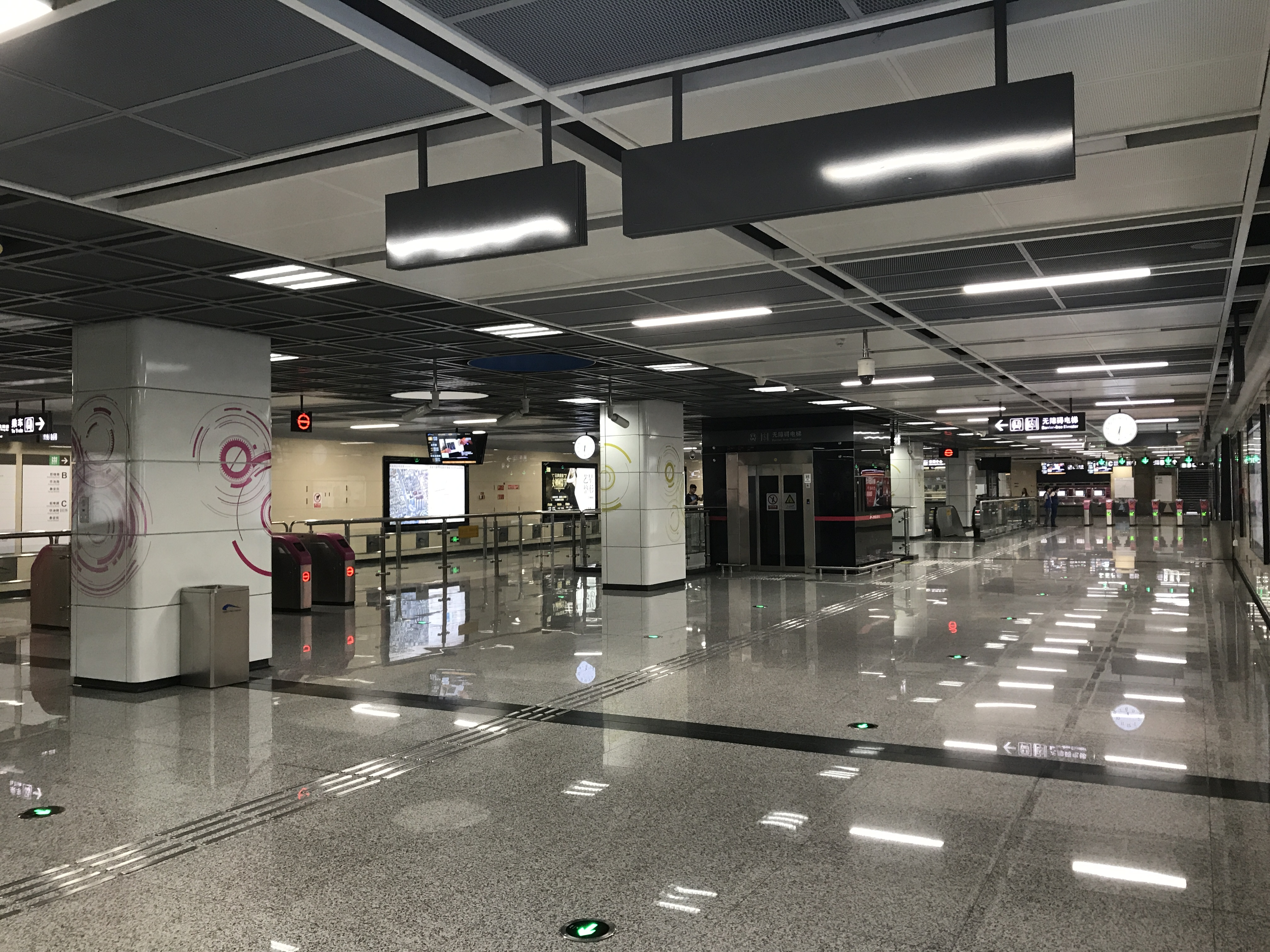
Concourse

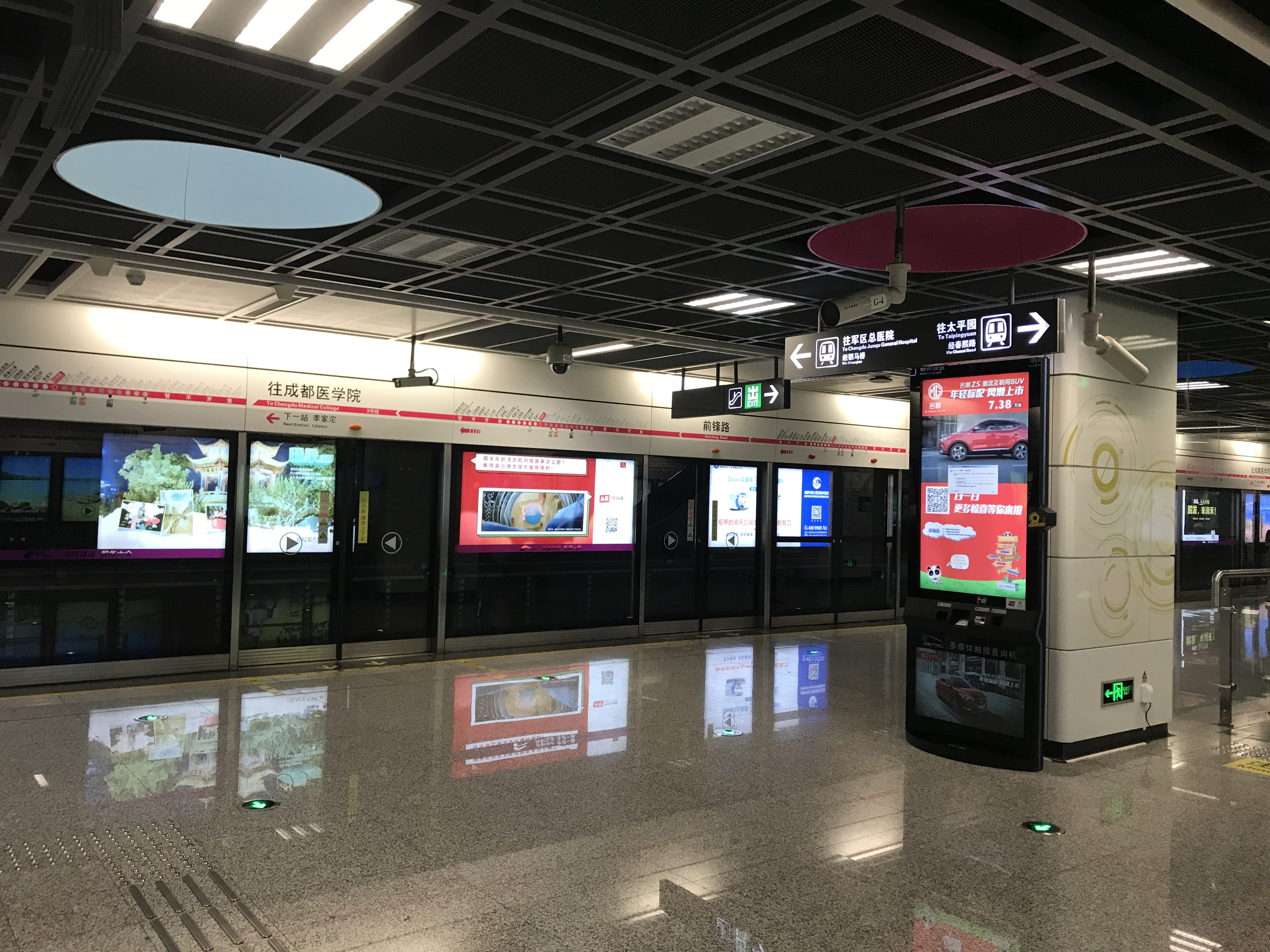
Line 3 platform
