= Niuwangmiao station =

Metro station in Chengdu, China

Niuwangmiao 牛王庙
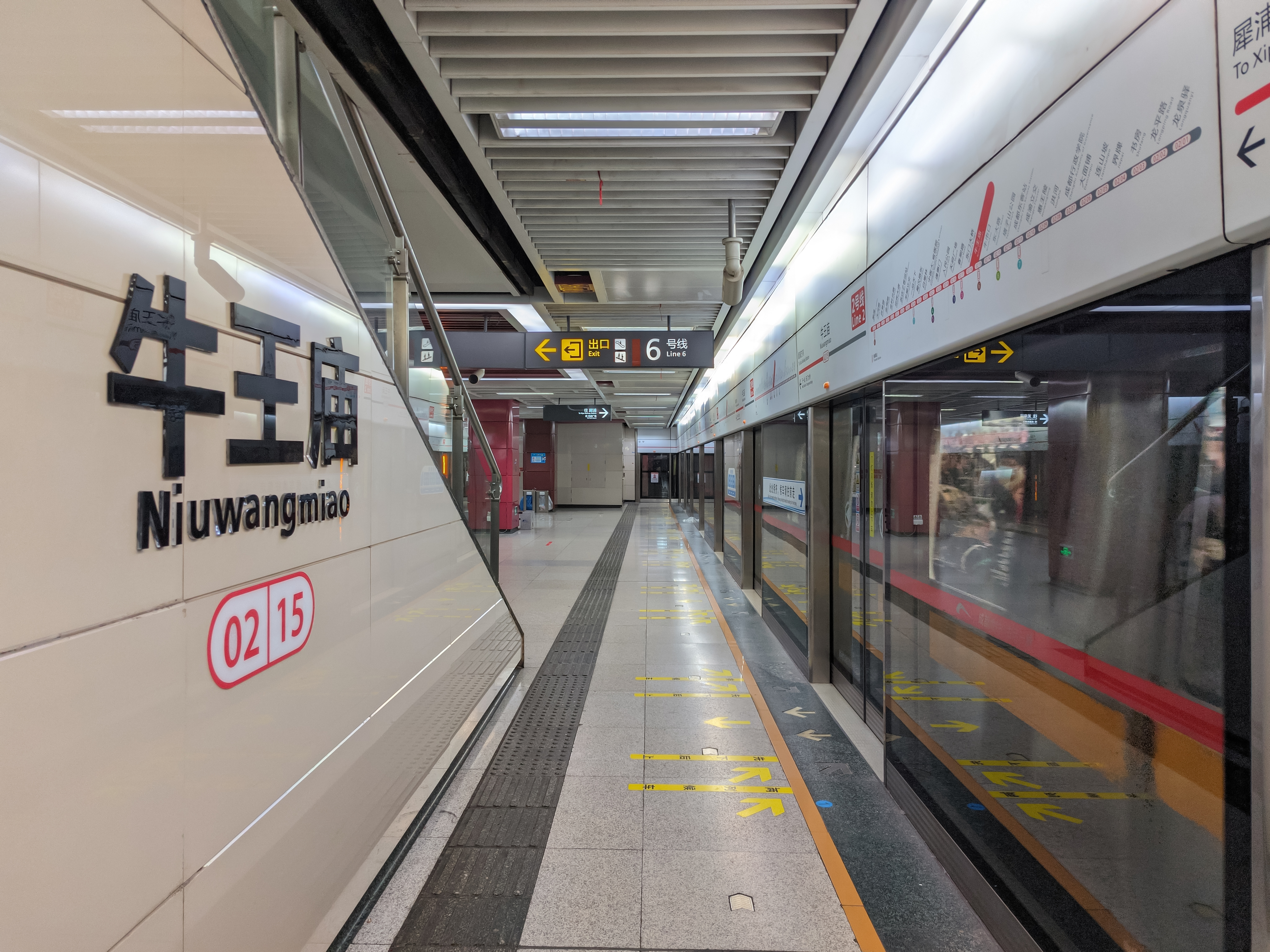
- Line 2 platform

General information
- Location: Jinjiang District, Chengdu, Sichuan; China
- Coordinates: 30.64762°N 104.09185°E
- Operated by: Chengdu Metro Limited
- Lines: Line 2 Line 6
- Platforms: 4 (2 island platforms)

Other information
- Station code: 0215 0627

History
- Opened: 16 September 2012

Services
Preceding station	Chengdu Metro	Following station
Niushikou towards Longquanyi	Line 2	Dongmen Bridge towards Xipu Railway Station
Yushuang Road towards Wangcong Temple	Line 6	Shunjiang Road towards Lanjiagou
Location

Niuwangmiao (Chinese: 牛王庙; pinyin: Niúwángmiào) is a station on Line 2 and Line 6 of the Chengdu Metro in China.

== Station layout ==
G	Entrances and Exits	Exits A-E, G, H
B1	Concourse	Faregates, Station Agent
B2	Westbound	← Line 2 towards Xipu (Dongmen Bridge)
B2	Island platform, doors open on the left
B2	Eastbound	Line 2 towards Longquanyi (Niushikou) →
B3	Northbound	← Line 6 to Wangcong Temple (Yushuang Road)
B3	Island platform, doors open on the left
B3	Southbound	Line 6 to Lanjiagou (Shunjiang Road) →

== Gallery ==
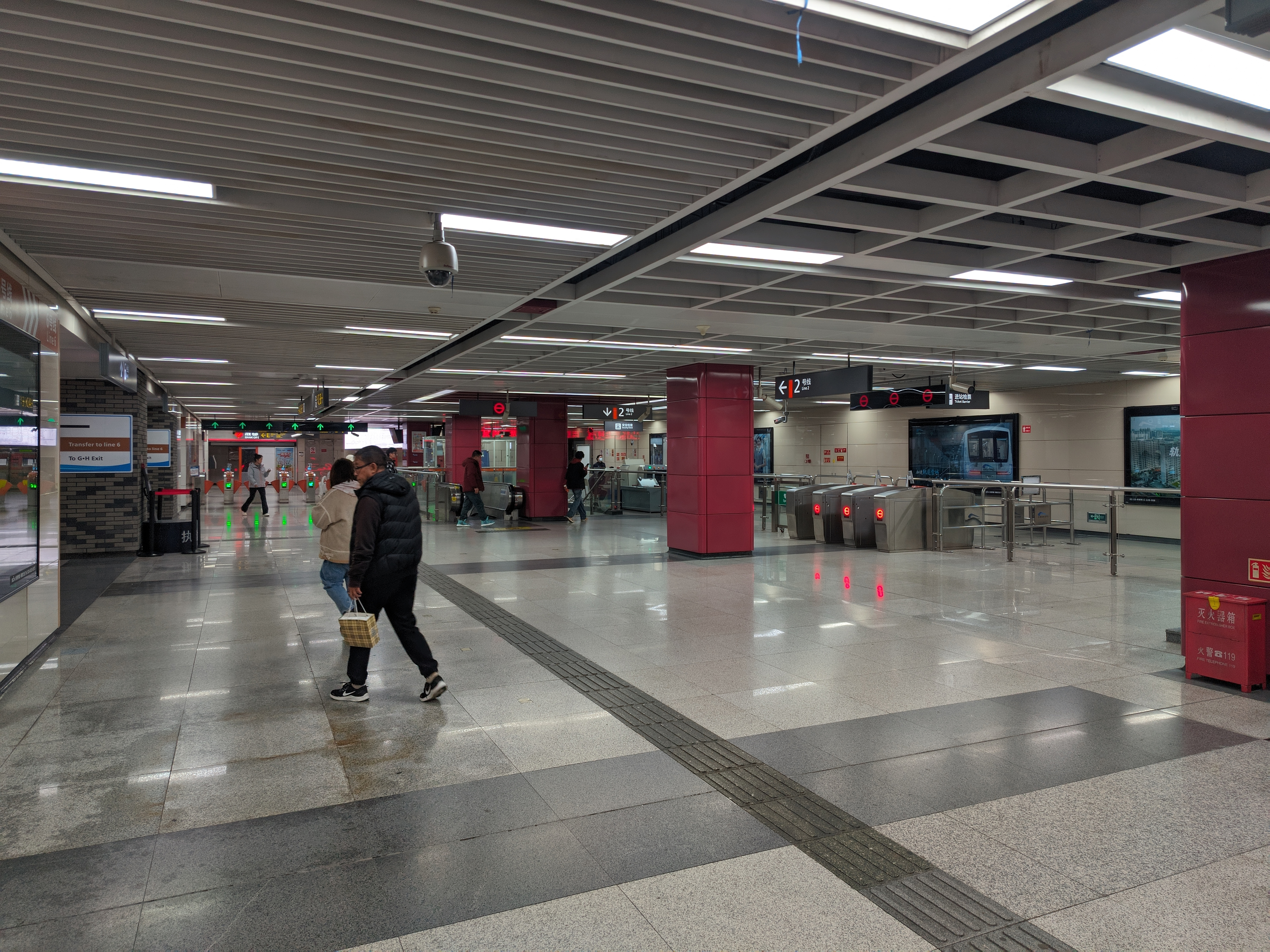
Line 2 concourse

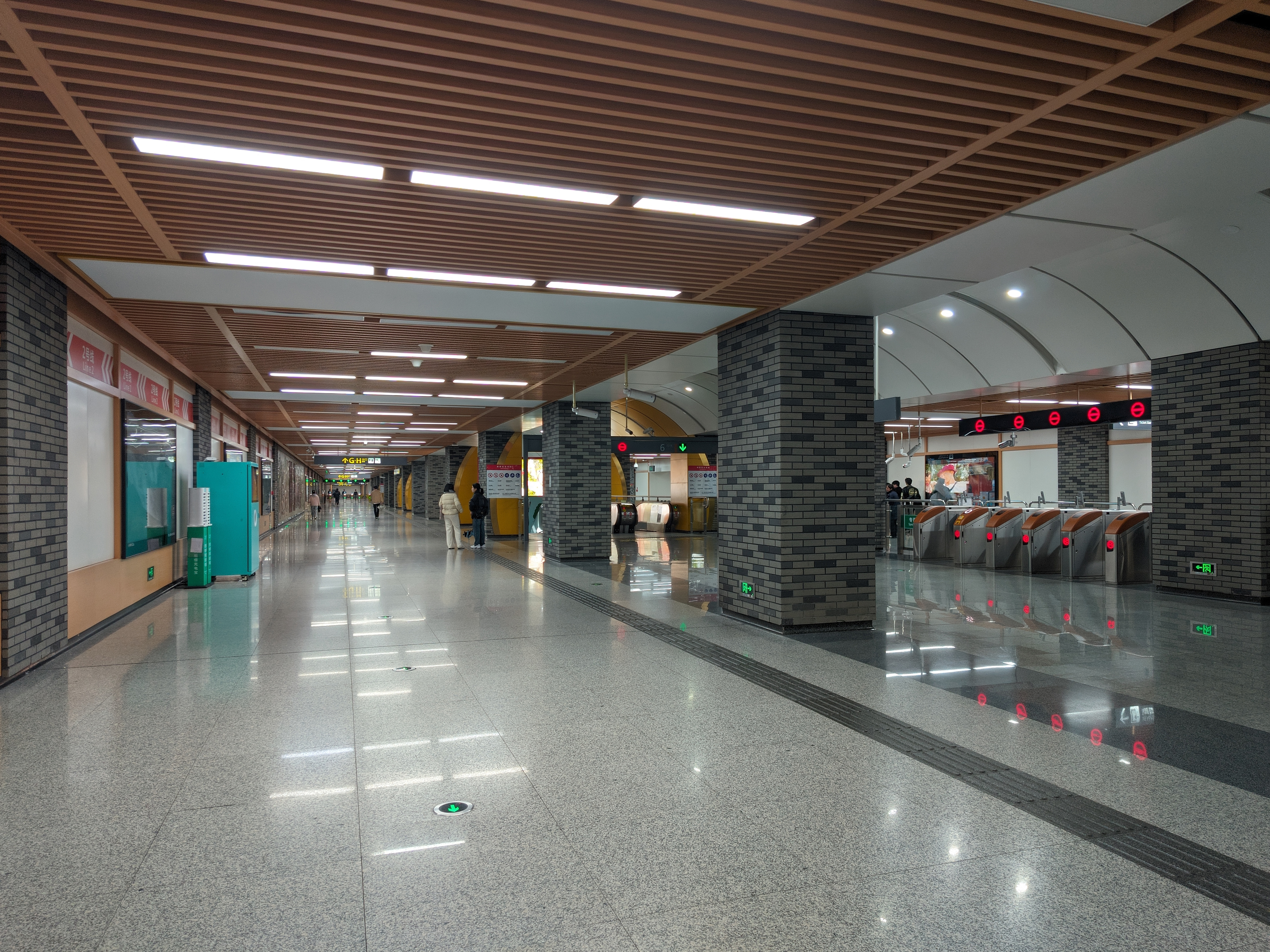
Line 6 concourse

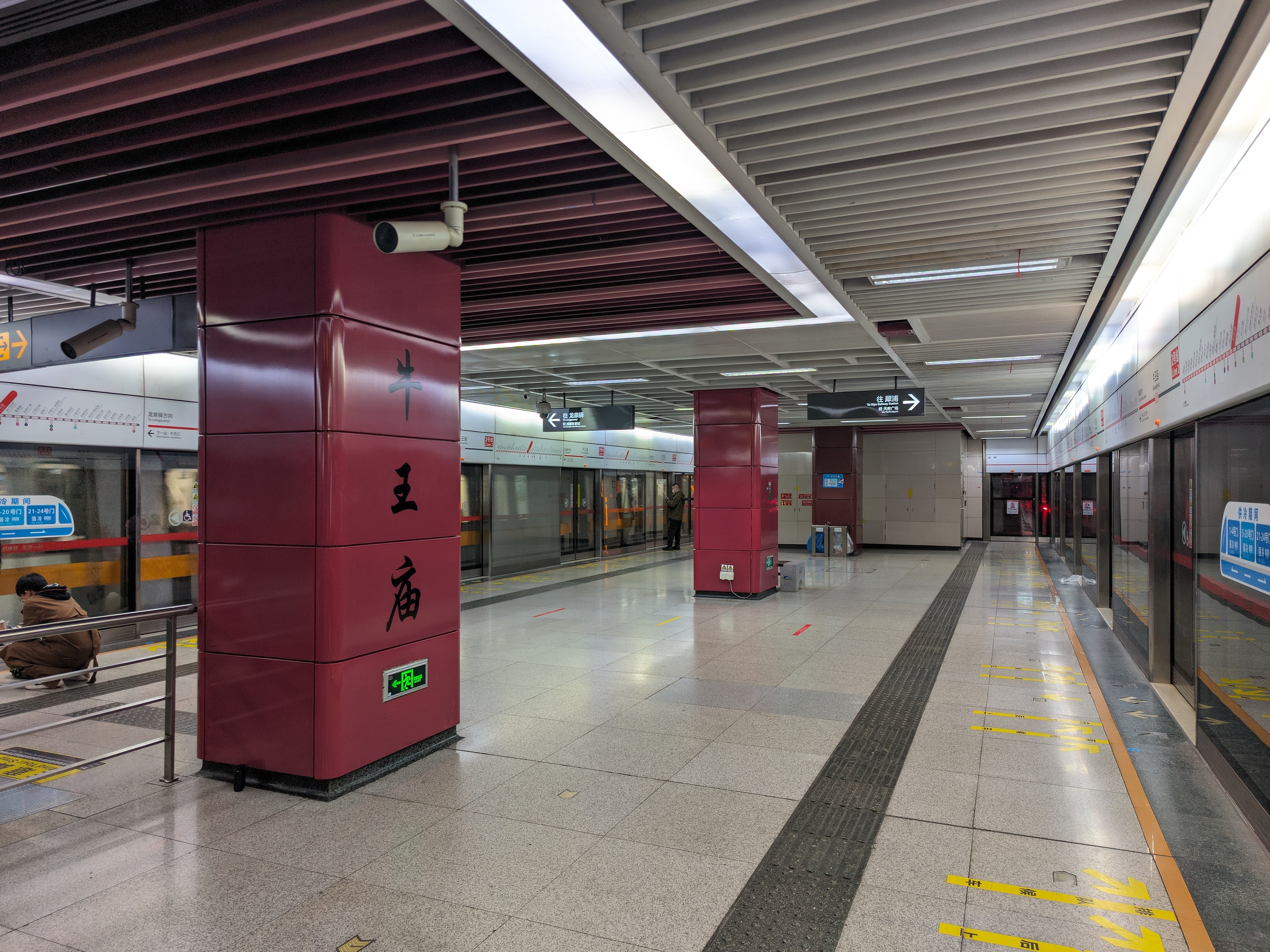
Line 2 platform

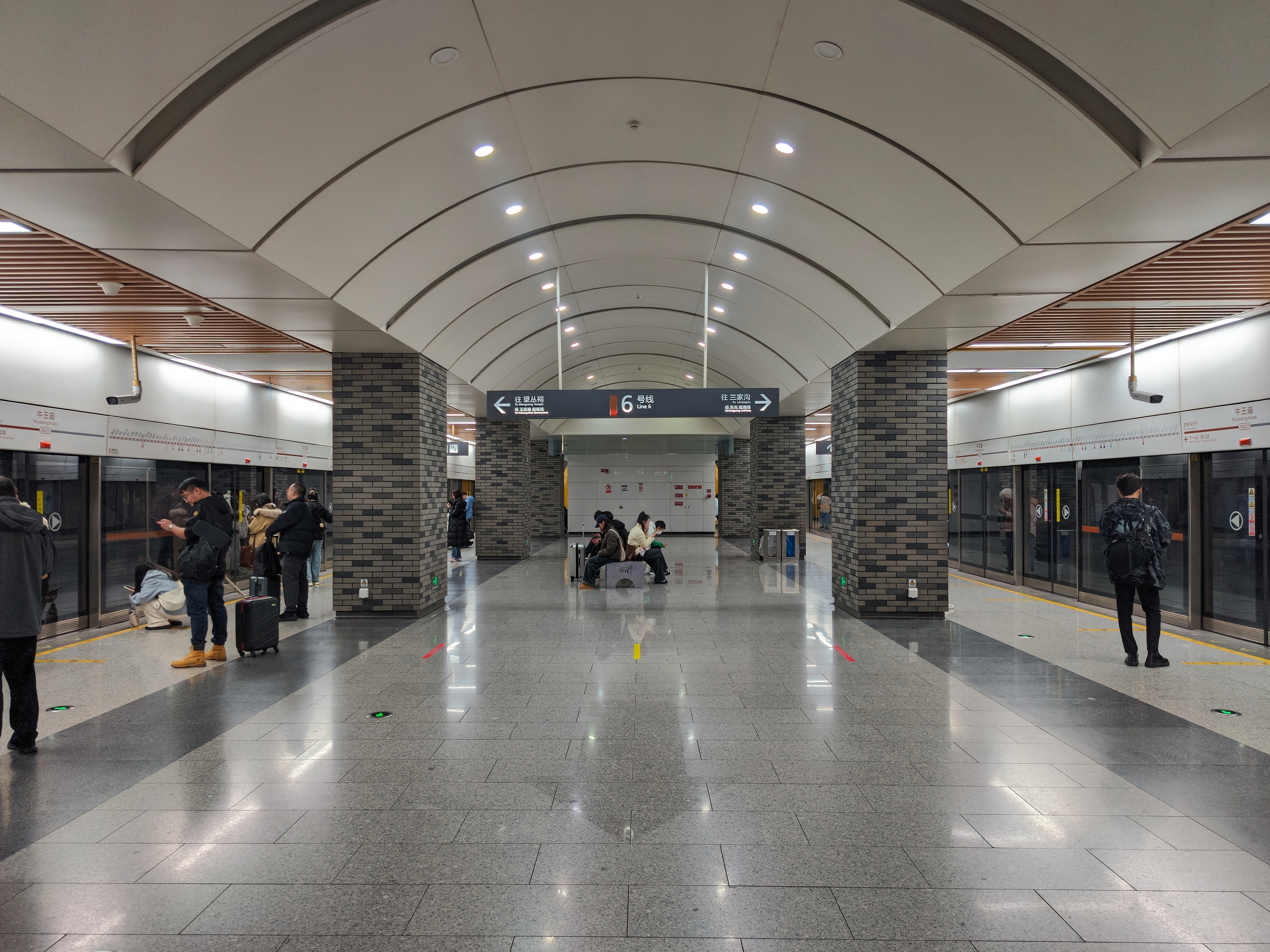
Line 6 platform
