= Yushuang Road station =

Metro station in Chengdu, China

Yushuang Road 玉双路
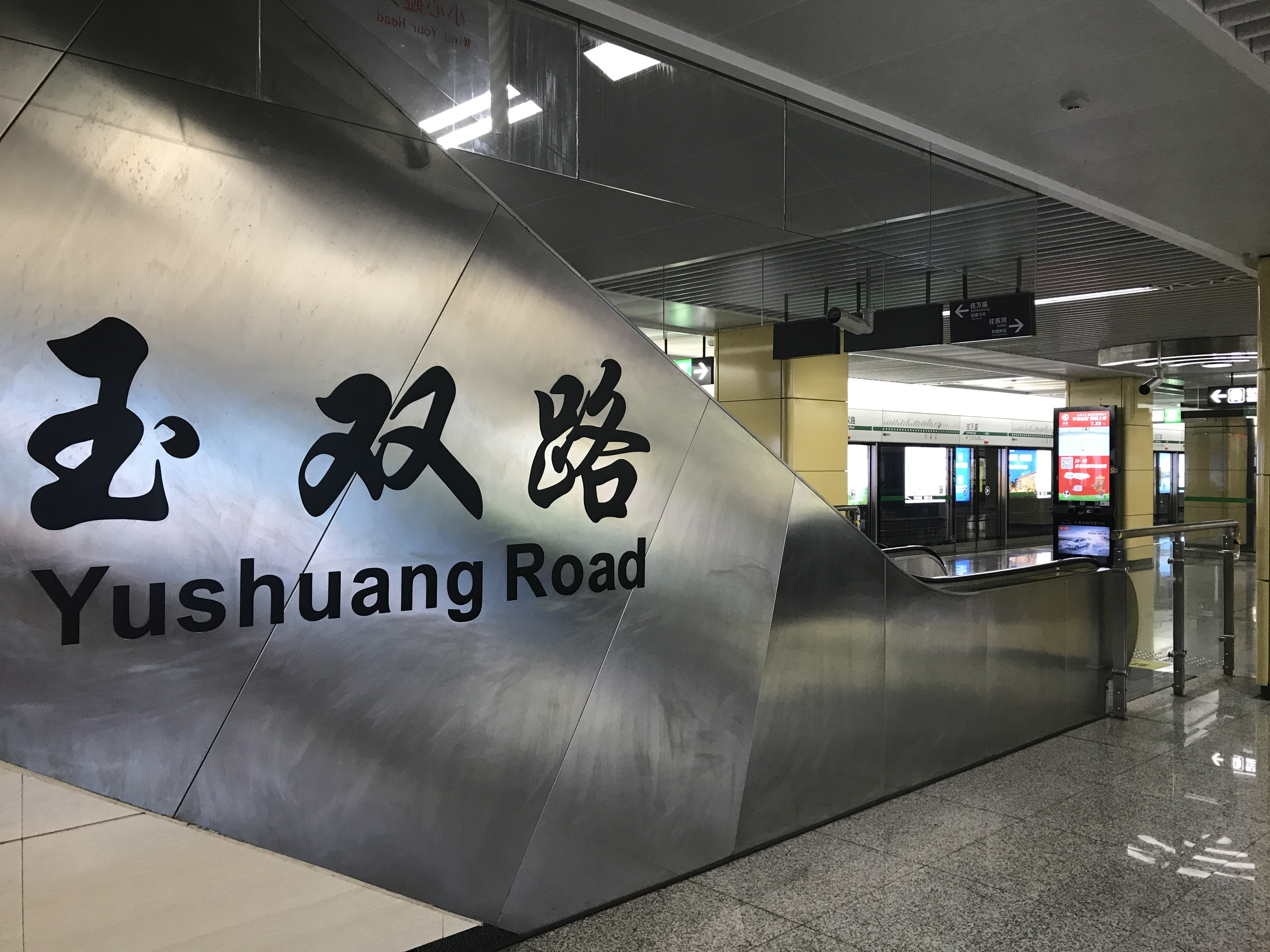

General information
- Location: Chenghua District, Chengdu, Sichuan; China
- Coordinates: 30.65624°N 104.09601°E
- Operated by: Chengdu Metro Limited
- Line(s): Line 4 Line 6
- Platforms: 4 (2 island platforms)

Other information
- Station code: 0409 0626

History
- Opened: 26 December 2015

Services
Preceding station	Chengdu Metro	Following station
Chengdu Second People's Hospital towards Wansheng	Line 4	Shuangqiao Road towards Xihe
Xinhong Road towards Wangcong Temple	Line 6	Niuwangmiao towards Lanjiagou
Location

Yushuang Road (Chinese: 玉双路) is a station on Line 4 and Line 6 of the Chengdu Metro in China.

== Station layout ==
G	Entrances and Exits	Exits A, C-F
B1	Concourse	Faregates, Station Agent
B2	Westbound	← Line 4 towards Wansheng (Chengdu Second People's Hospital)
B2	Island platform, doors open on the left
B2	Easthbound	Line 4 towards Xihe (Shuangqiao Road) →
B3	Northbound	← Line 6 to Wangcong Temple (Xinhong Road)
B3	Island platform, doors open on the left
B3	Southbound	Line 6 to Lanjiagou (Niuwangmiao) →

== Gallery ==
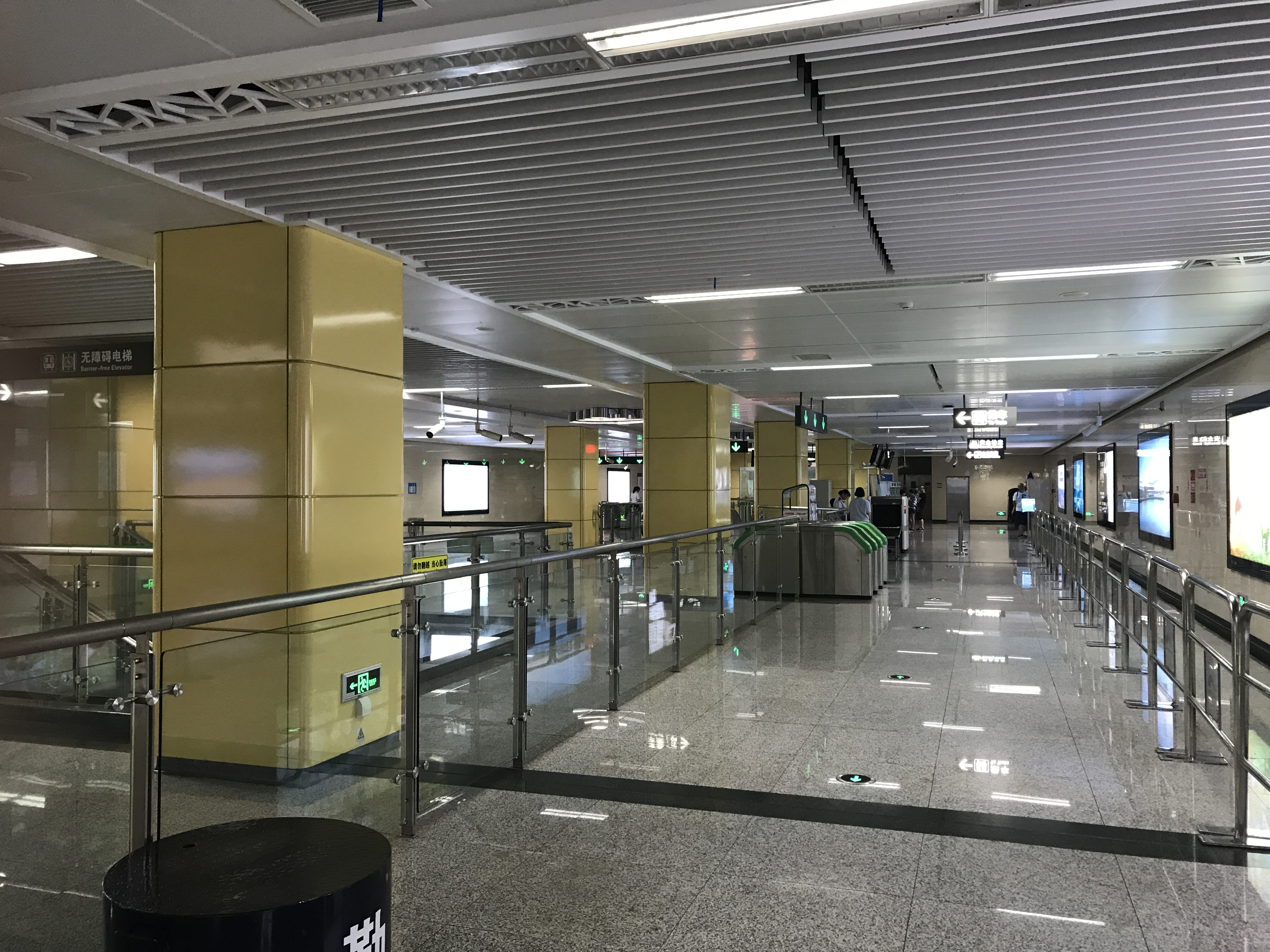
Concourse

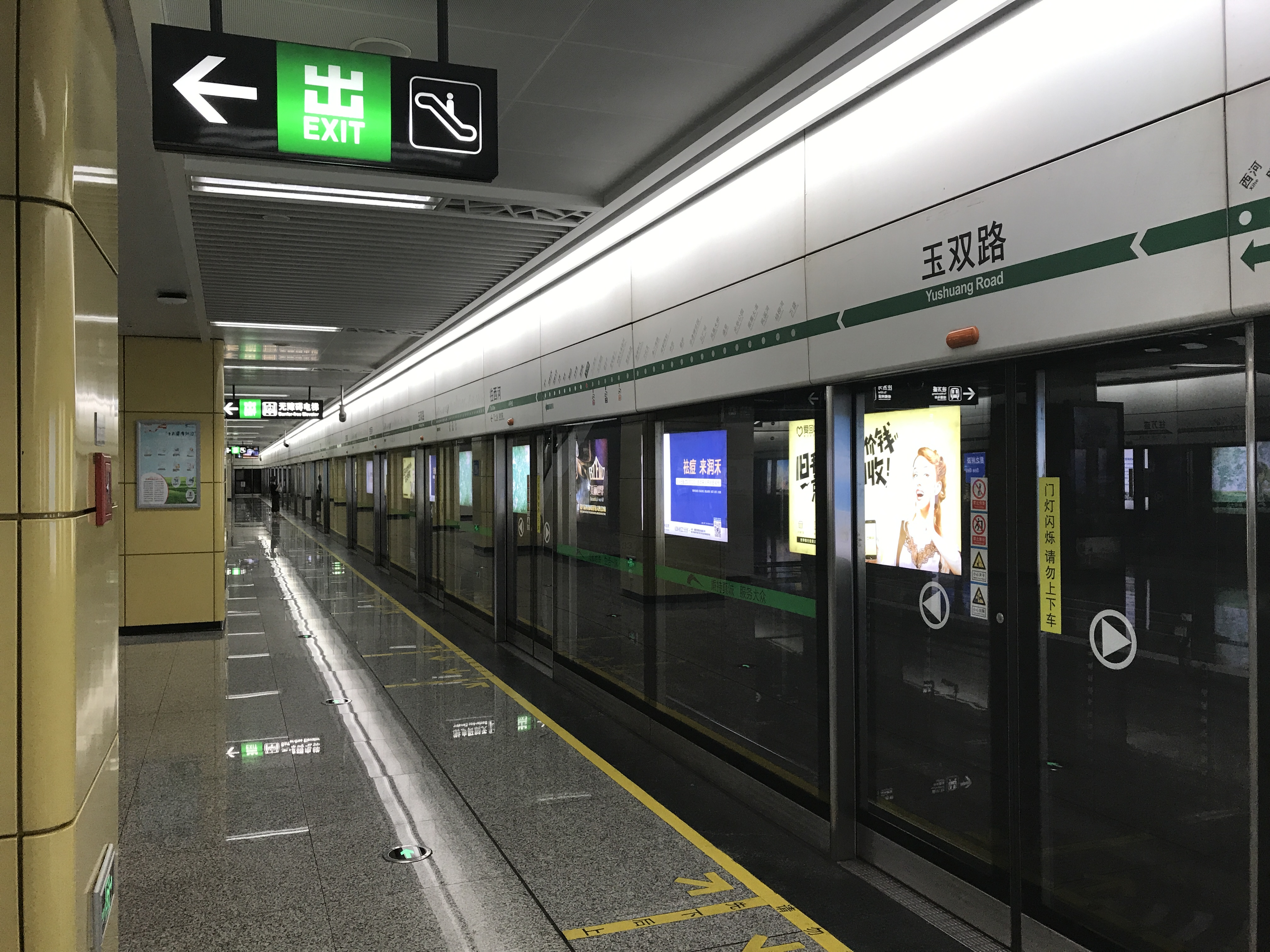
Line 4 platform
