= Chengdu Second People's Hospital station =

Metro station in Chengdu, China

Chengdu Second People's Hospital 市二医院
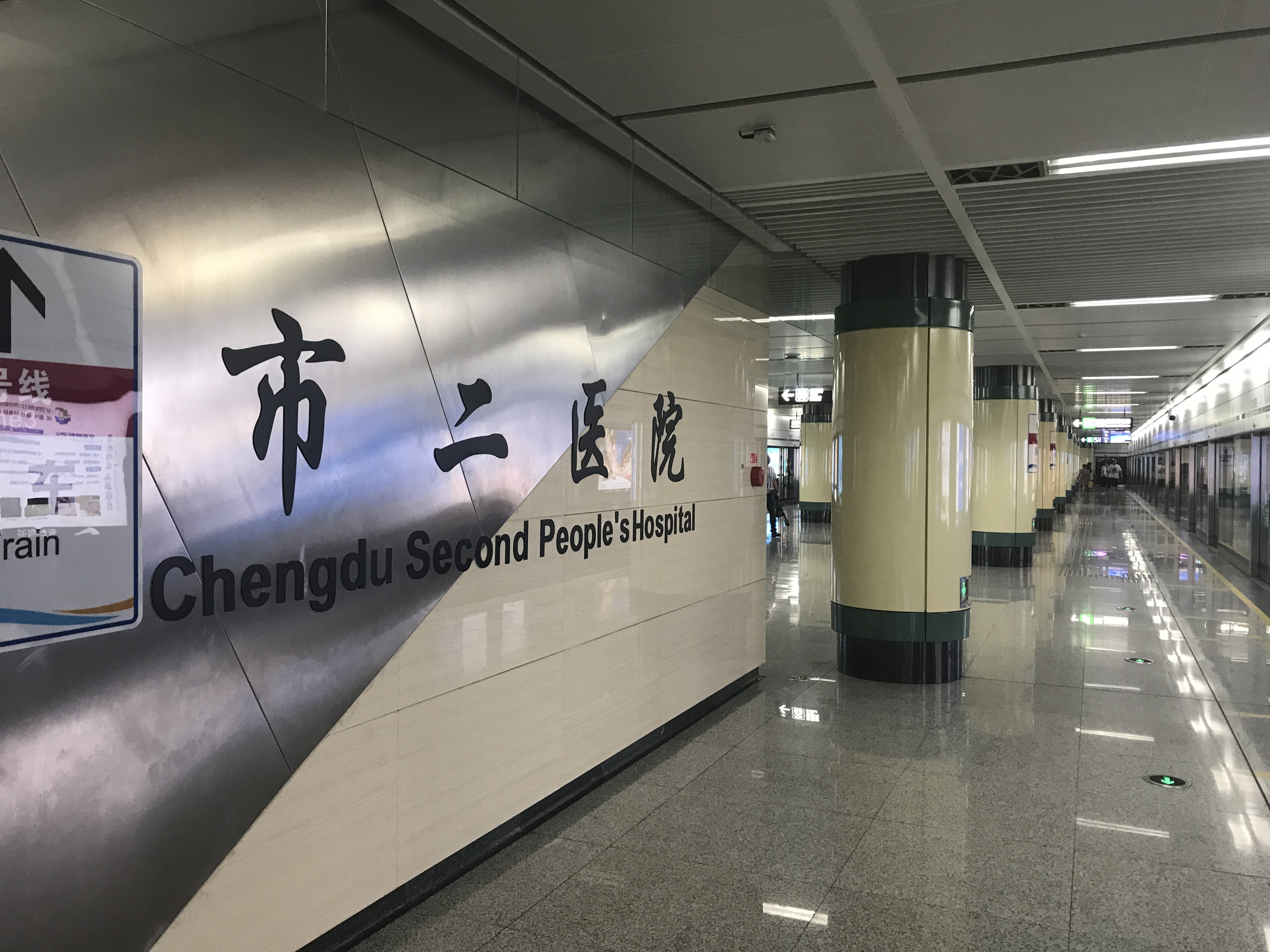

General information
- Location: Jinjiang District, Chengdu, Sichuan; China
- Coordinates: 30.66297°N 104.08163°E
- Operated by: Chengdu Metro Limited
- Lines: Line 3 Line 4
- Platforms: 4 (2 island platforms)

Other information
- Station code: 0318 0410

History
- Opened: 26 December 2015

Services
Preceding station	Chengdu Metro	Following station
Hongxing Bridge towards Chengdu Medical College	Line 3	Chunxi Road towards Shuangliu West Railway Station
Taisheng South Road towards Wansheng	Line 4	Yushuang Road towards Xihe
Location

Chengdu Second People's Hospital (Chinese: 市二医院) is a transfer station on Line 3 and Line 4 of the Chengdu Metro in China.

== Station layout ==
G	Entrances and Exits	Exits A-F
B1	Concourse	Faregates, Station Agent
B2	Westbound	← Line 4 towards Wansheng (Taisheng South Road)
B2	Island platform, doors open on the left
B2	Eastbound	Line 4 towards Xihe (Yushuang Road) →
B3	Northbound	← Line 3 towards Chengdu Medical College (Hongxing Bridge)
B3	Island platform, doors open on the left
B3	Southbound	Line 3 towards Shuangliu West Railway Station (Chunxi Road) →

== Gallery ==
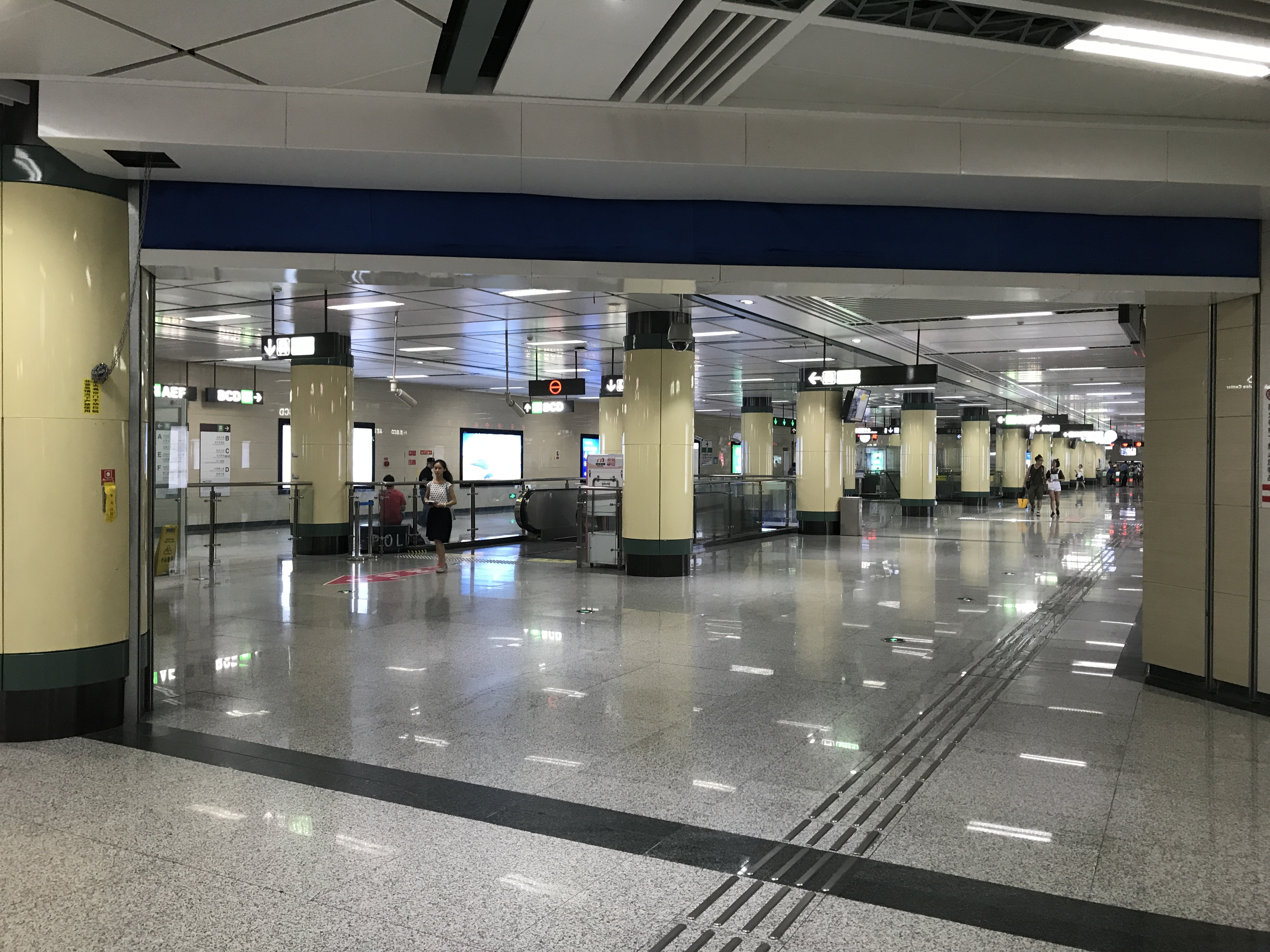
Concourse

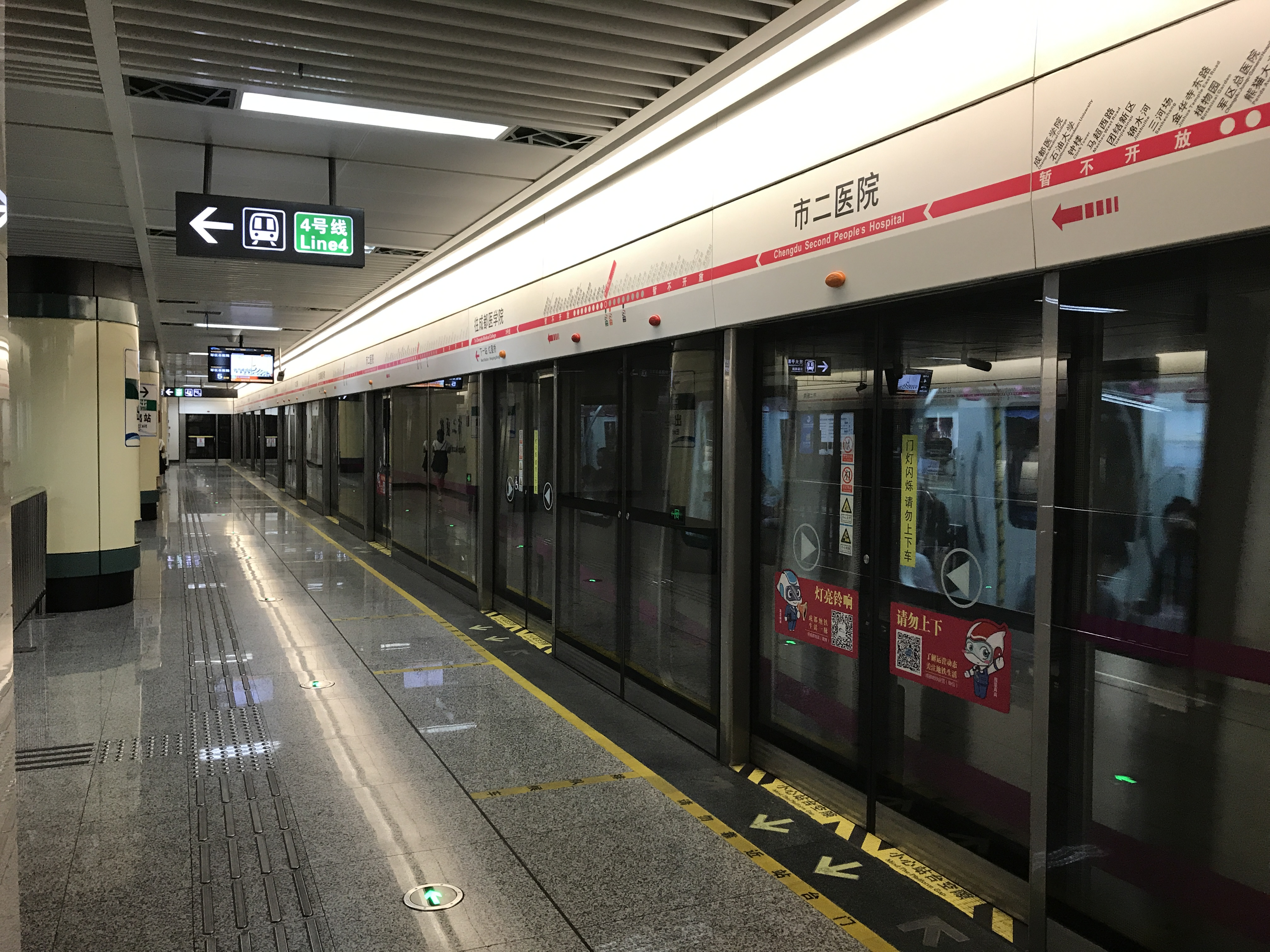
Line 3 platform

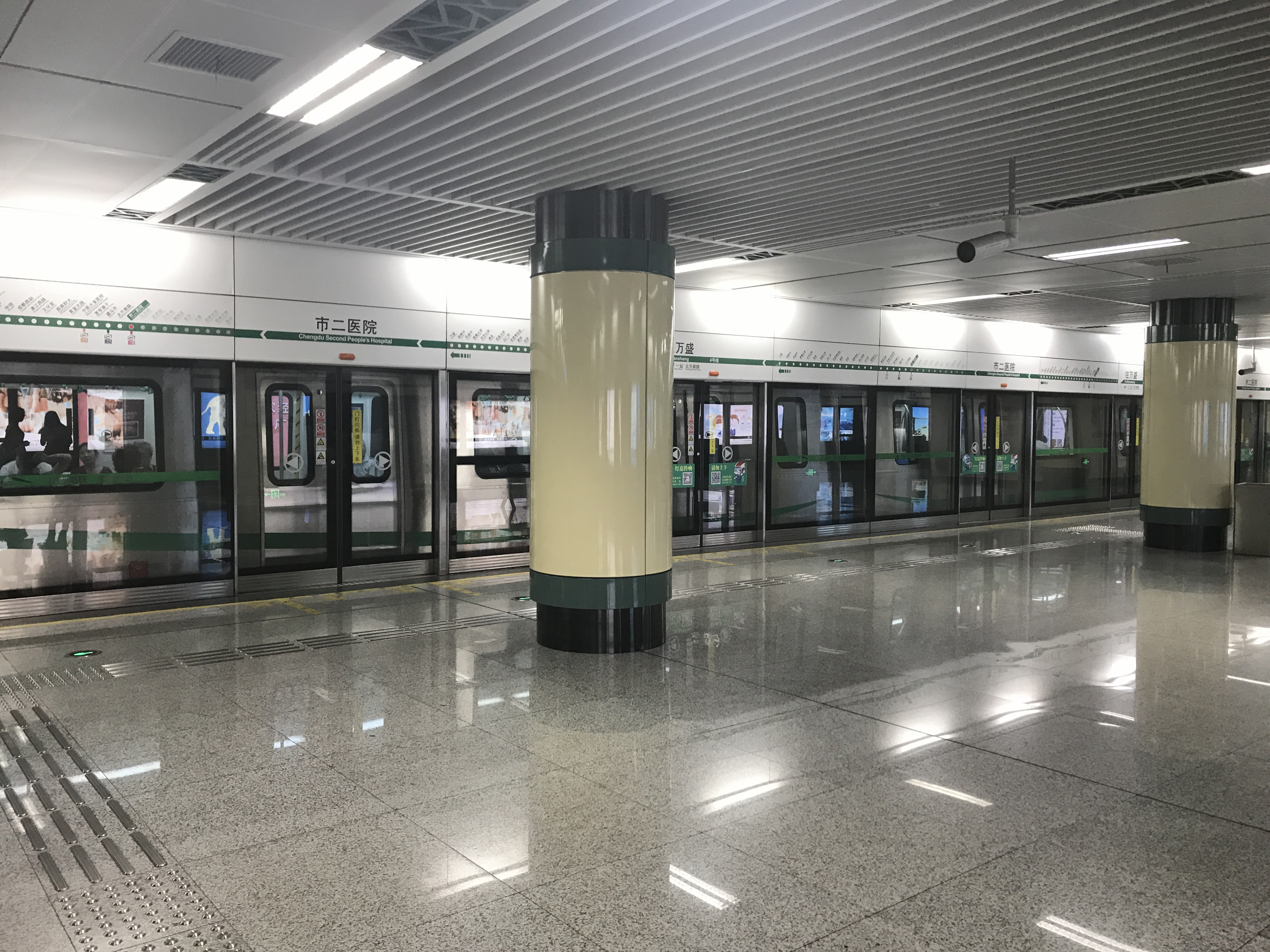
Line 4 platform
