= Xinhong Road station =

Metro station in Chengdu, China

Xinhong Road 新鸿路
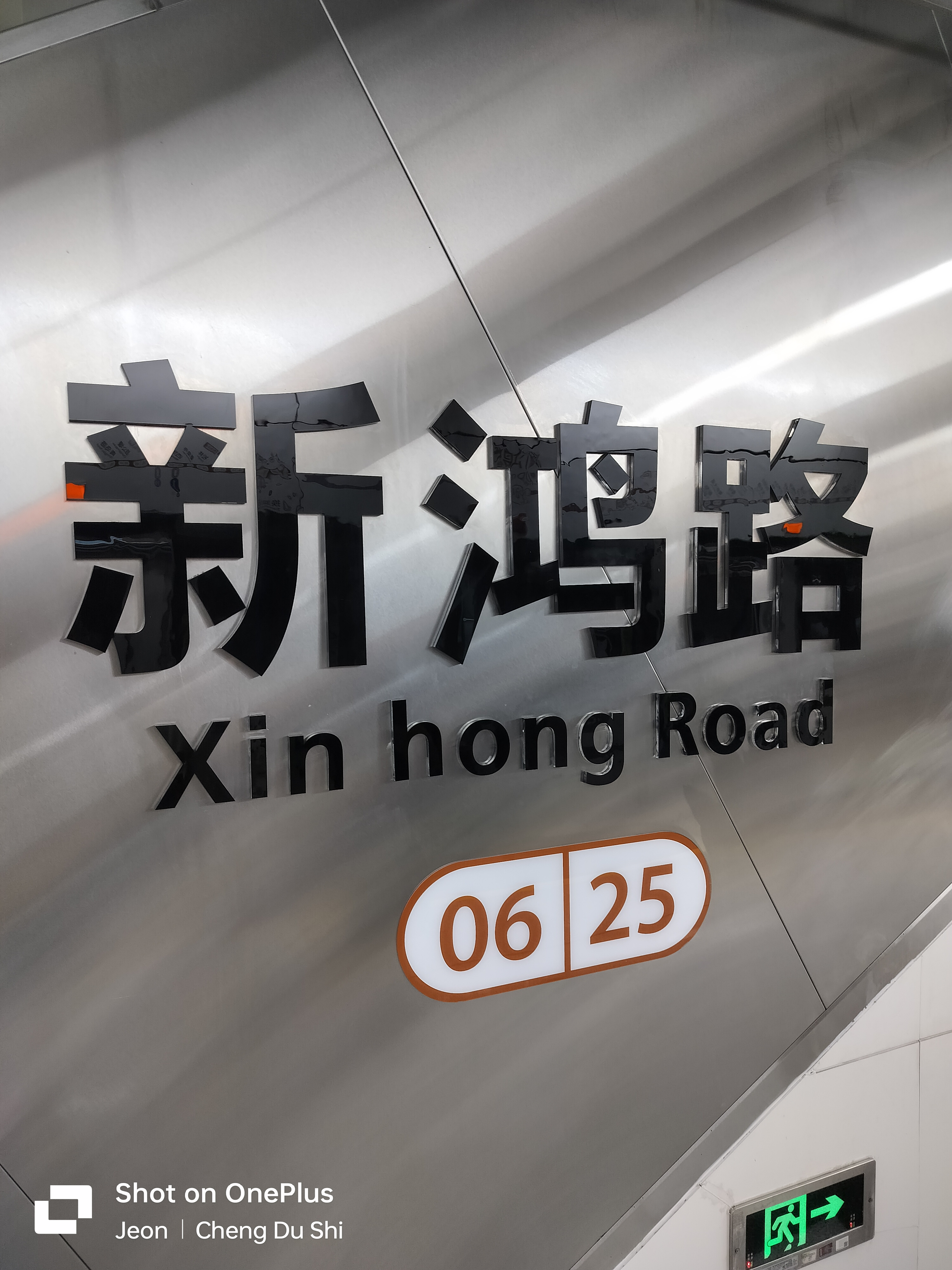

General information
- Location: Chenghua District, Chengdu, Sichuan; China
- Coordinates: 30.6654°N 104.09953°E
- Operated by: Chengdu Metro Limited
- Line(s): Line 6
- Platforms: 2 (1 island platform)

Other information
- Station code: 0625

History
- Opened: 18 December 2020

Services
Preceding station	Chengdu Metro	Following station
University of Electronic Science and Technology of China & Jianshe North Road towards Wangcong Temple	Line 6	Yushuang Road towards Lanjiagou
Location

Xinhong Road Station is a metro station at Chengdu, Sichuan, China. It opened on December 18, 2020 with the opening of Chengdu Metro Line 6.
