= Hongxing Bridge station =

Metro station in Chengdu, China

Hongxing Bridge 红星桥
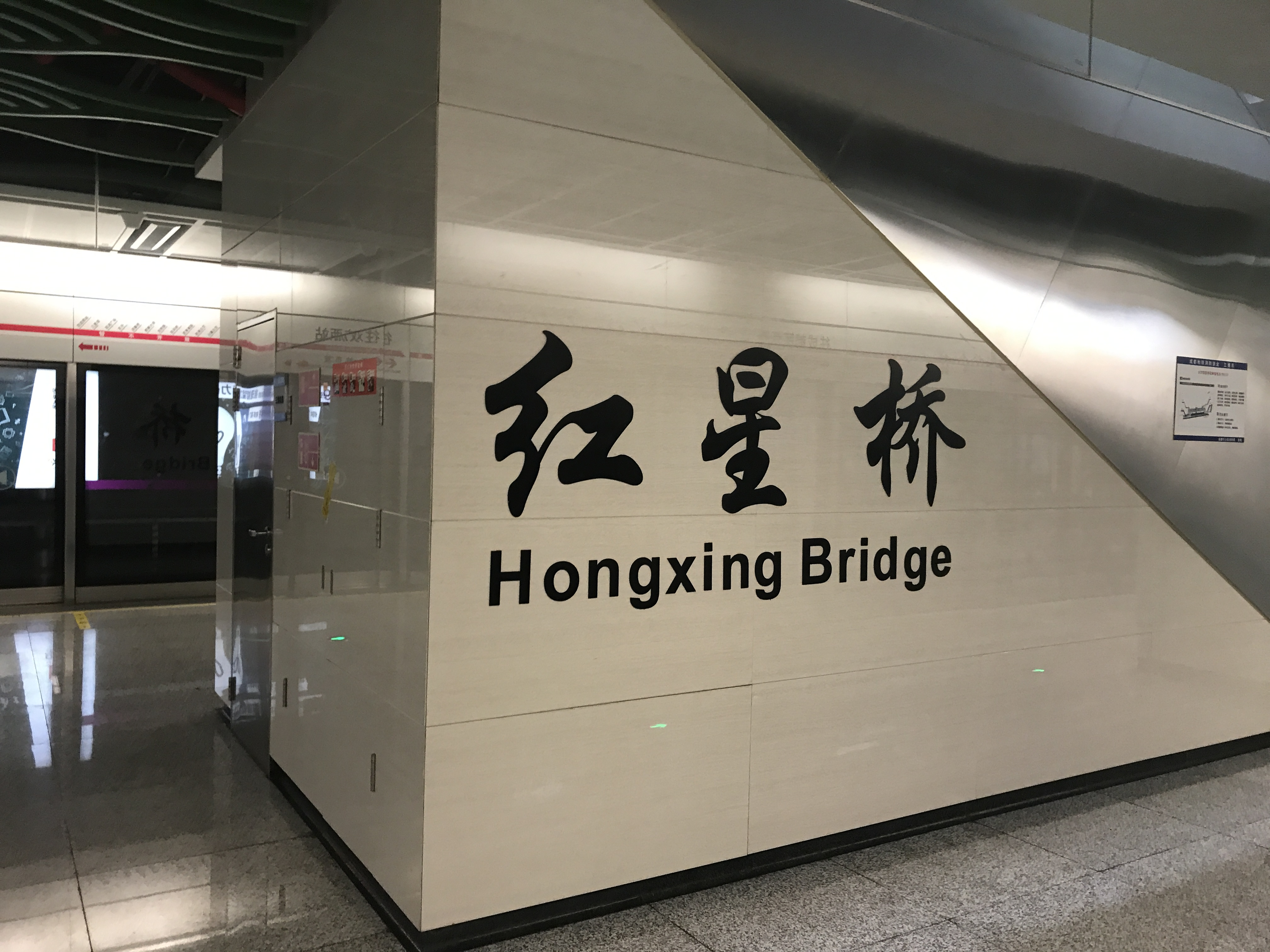

General information
- Location: Jinjiang District, Chengdu, Sichuan; China
- Coordinates: 30.6763°N 104.0882°E
- Operated by: Chengdu Metro Limited
- Lines: Line 3 Line 17
- Platforms: 4 (2 island platforms)

Other information
- Station code: 0317 1709

History
- Opened: 31 July 2016 (Line 3); 17 September 2025 (Line 17)

Services
Preceding station	Chengdu Metro	Following station
Qianfeng Road towards Chengdu Medical College	Line 3	Chengdu Second People's Hospital towards Shuangliu West Railway Station
Chenghuangmiao towards Jiujiang North	Line 17	Jianshe North Road towards Gaohong
Location

Hongxing Bridge (Chinese: 红星桥) is a station on Line 3 and Line 17 of the Chengdu Metro in China.

== Station layout ==
G	Entrances and Exits	Exits A-F, G1
B1	Concourse	Faregates, Station Agent
B2	Northbound	← Line 3 towards Chengdu Medical College (Qianfeng Road)
B2	Island platform, doors open on the left
B2	Southbound	Line 3 towards Shuangliu West Station (Chengdu Second People's Hospital) →
B3	Westbound	← Line 17 to Jiujiang North (Chenghuangmiao)
B3	Island platform, doors open on the left
B3	Eastbound	Line 17 to Gaohong (Jianshe North Road) →

== Gallery ==
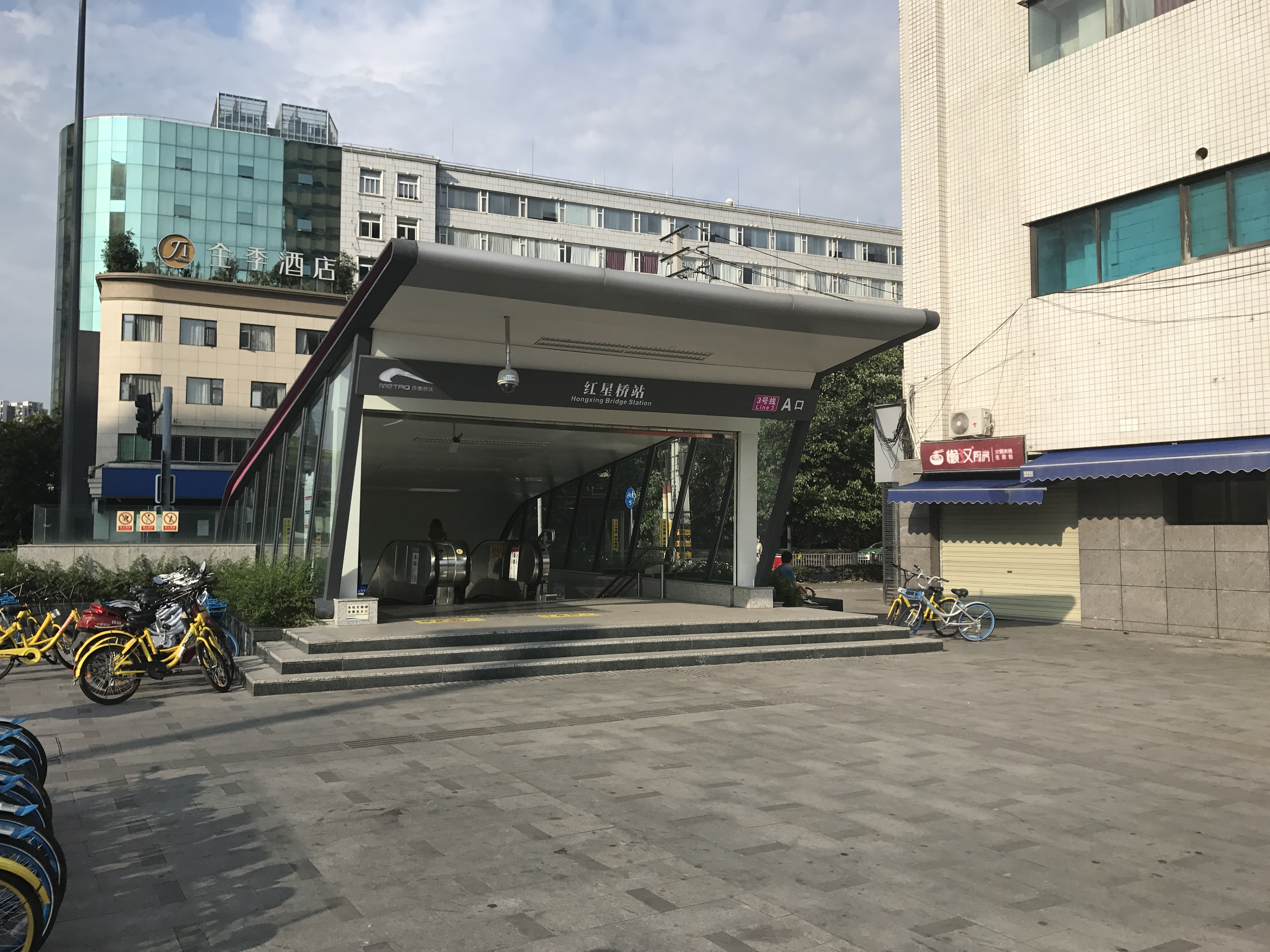
Entrance A

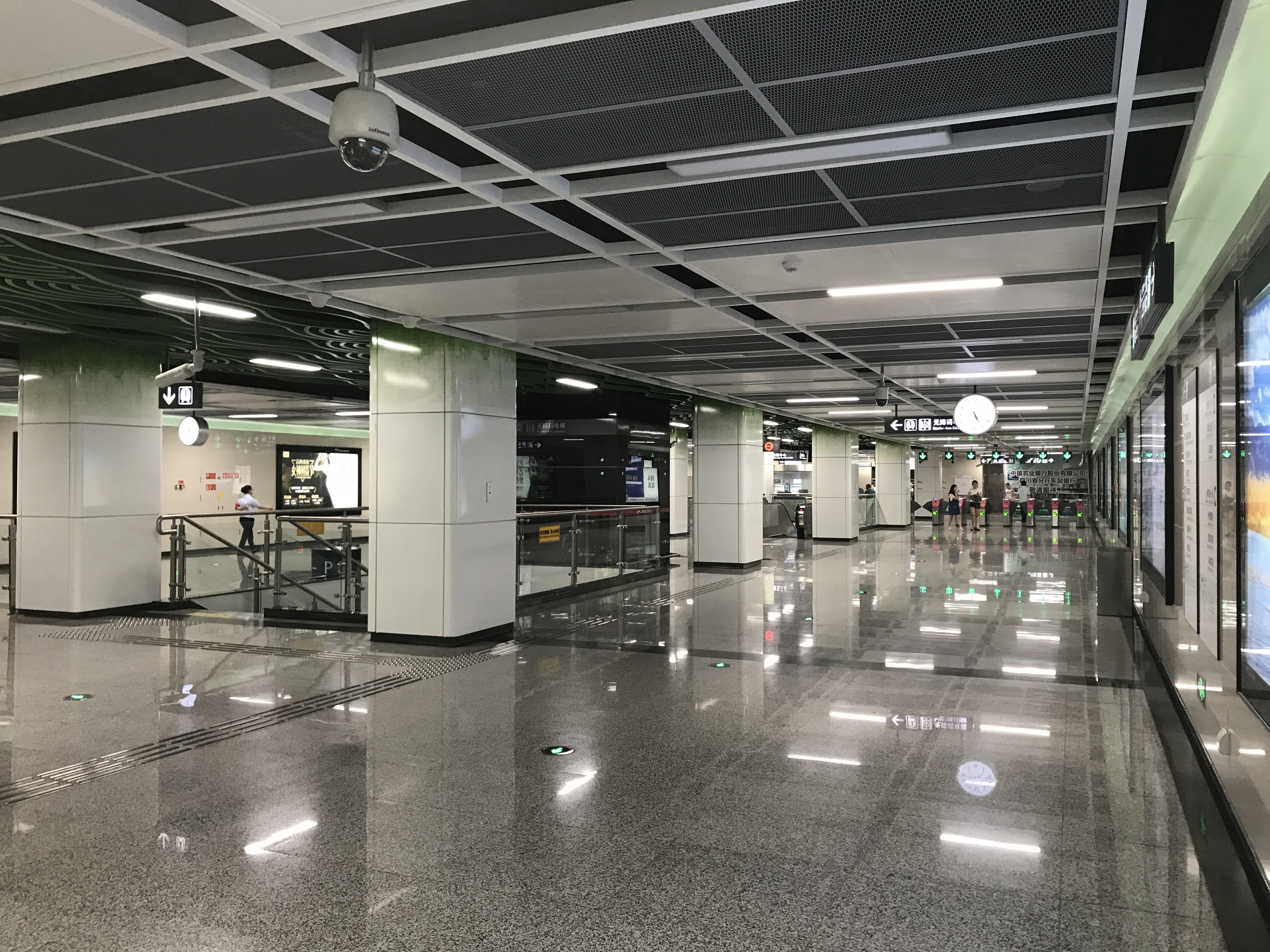
Line 3 Concourse

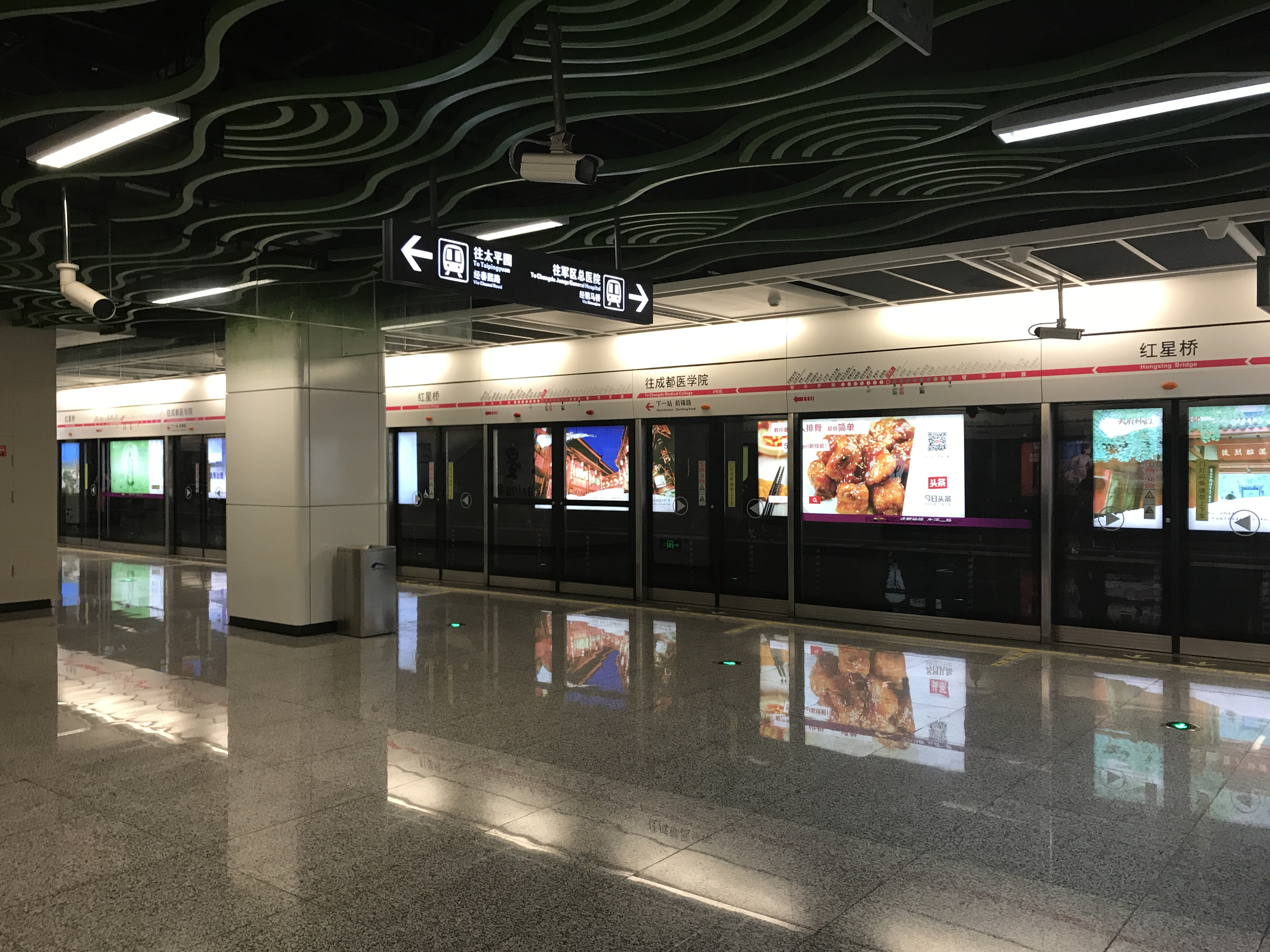
Line 3 Platform
