= University of Electronic Science and Technology of China & Jianshe North Road station =

Metro station in Chengdu, China

University of Electronic Science and Technology of China & Jianshe North Road 电子科大建设北路
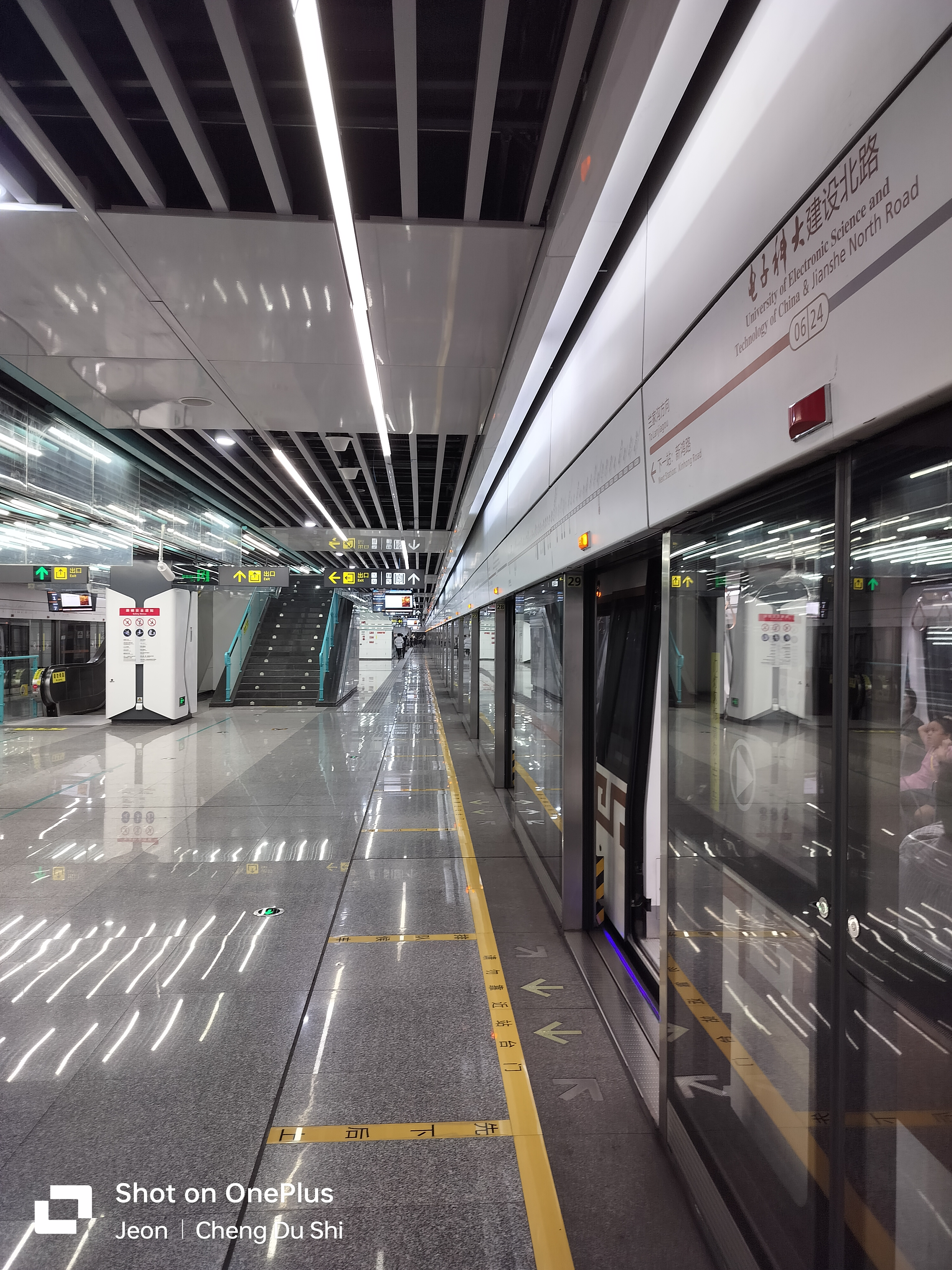

General information
- Location: Chenghua District, Chengdu, Sichuan; China
- Coordinates: 30.6747°N 104.0958°E
- Operator: Chengdu Metro Limited
- Lines: Line 6 Line 17
- Platforms: 4 (2 island platforms)

Other information
- Station code: 0624 1708

History
- Opened: 18 December 2020 (Line 6); 17 September 2025 (Line 17)

Services
Preceding station	Chengdu Metro	Following station
Qianfeng Road towards Wangcong Temple	Line 6	Xinhong Road towards Lanjiagou
Hongxing Bridge towards Jiujiang North	Line 17	Tashui Bridge towards Gaohong
Location

University of Electronic Science and Technology of China & Jianshe North Road Station is a metro station at Chengdu, Sichuan, China. It opened on December 18, 2020 for Chengdu Metro Line 6 and September 17, 2025 for Chengdu Metro Line 17.
