= Nanxun Avenue station =

Metro station in Chengdu, China

Nanxun Avenue 南熏大道
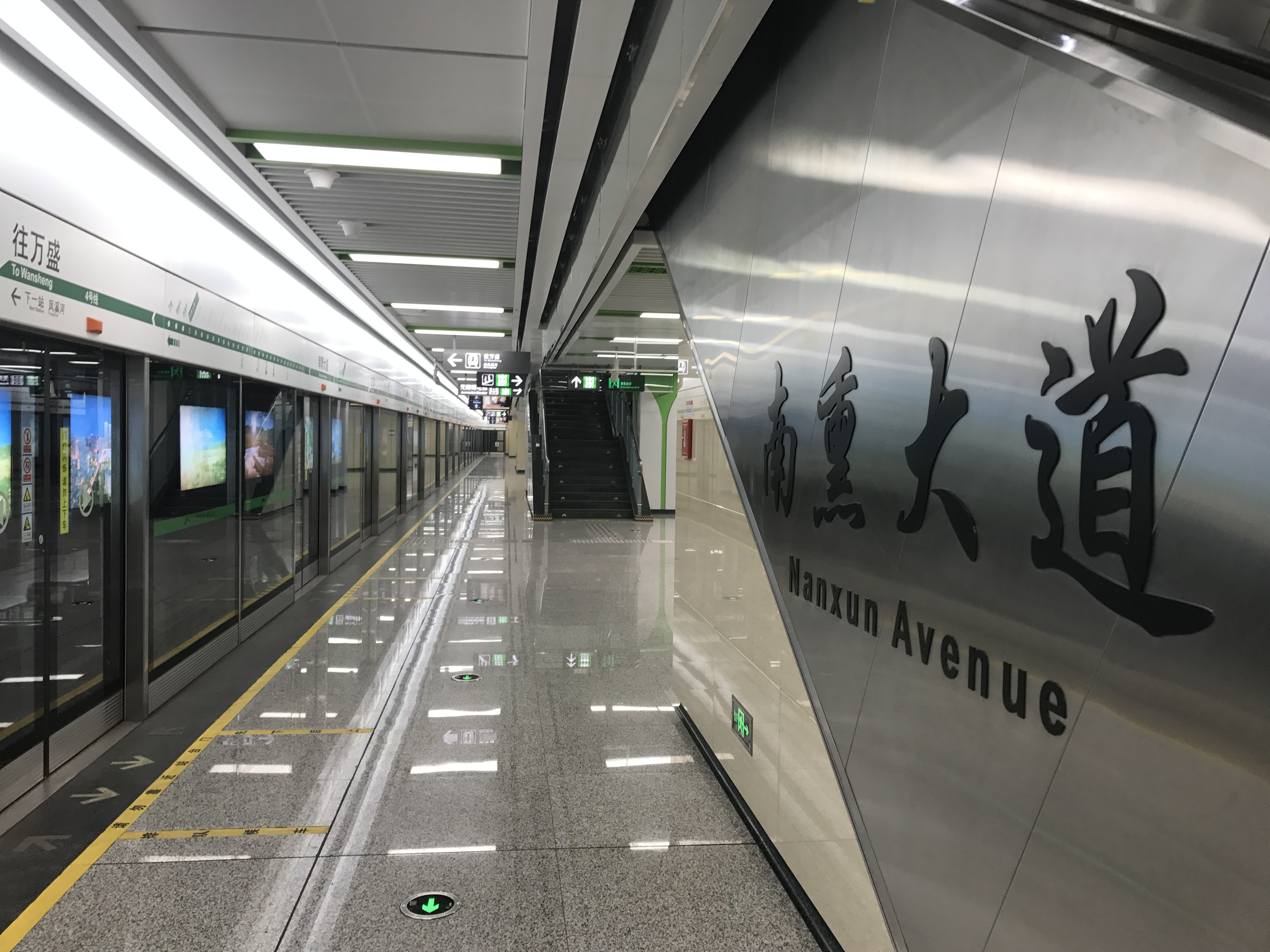

General information
- Location: Wenjiang District, Chengdu, Sichuan; China
- Operator: Chengdu Metro Limited
- Line: Line 4
- Platforms: 2 (1 island platform)

Other information
- Station code: 0427

History
- Opened: 2 June 2017

Services
Preceding station	Chengdu Metro	Following station
Fengxihe towards Wansheng	Line 4	Guanghua Park towards Xihe
Location

Nanxun Avenue (Chinese: 南熏大道) is a station on Line 4 of the Chengdu Metro in China.

== Station layout ==
G	Entrances and Exits	Exits A-D
B1	Concourse	Faregates, Station Agent
B2	Westbound	← Line 4 towards Wansheng (Fengxihe)
B2	Island platform, doors open on the left
B2	Easthbound	Line 4 towards Xihe (Guanghua Park) →

== Gallery ==
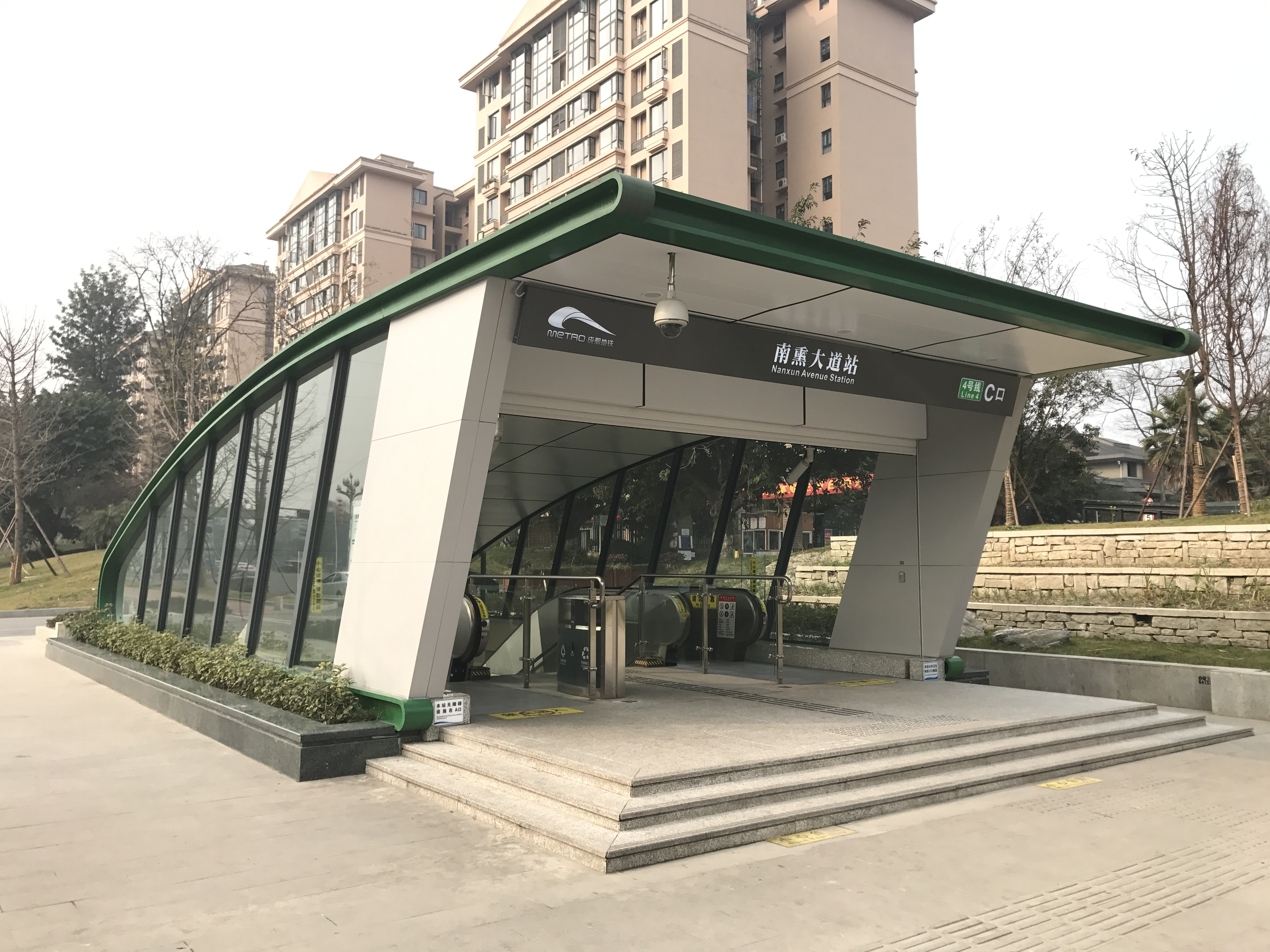
Entrance C

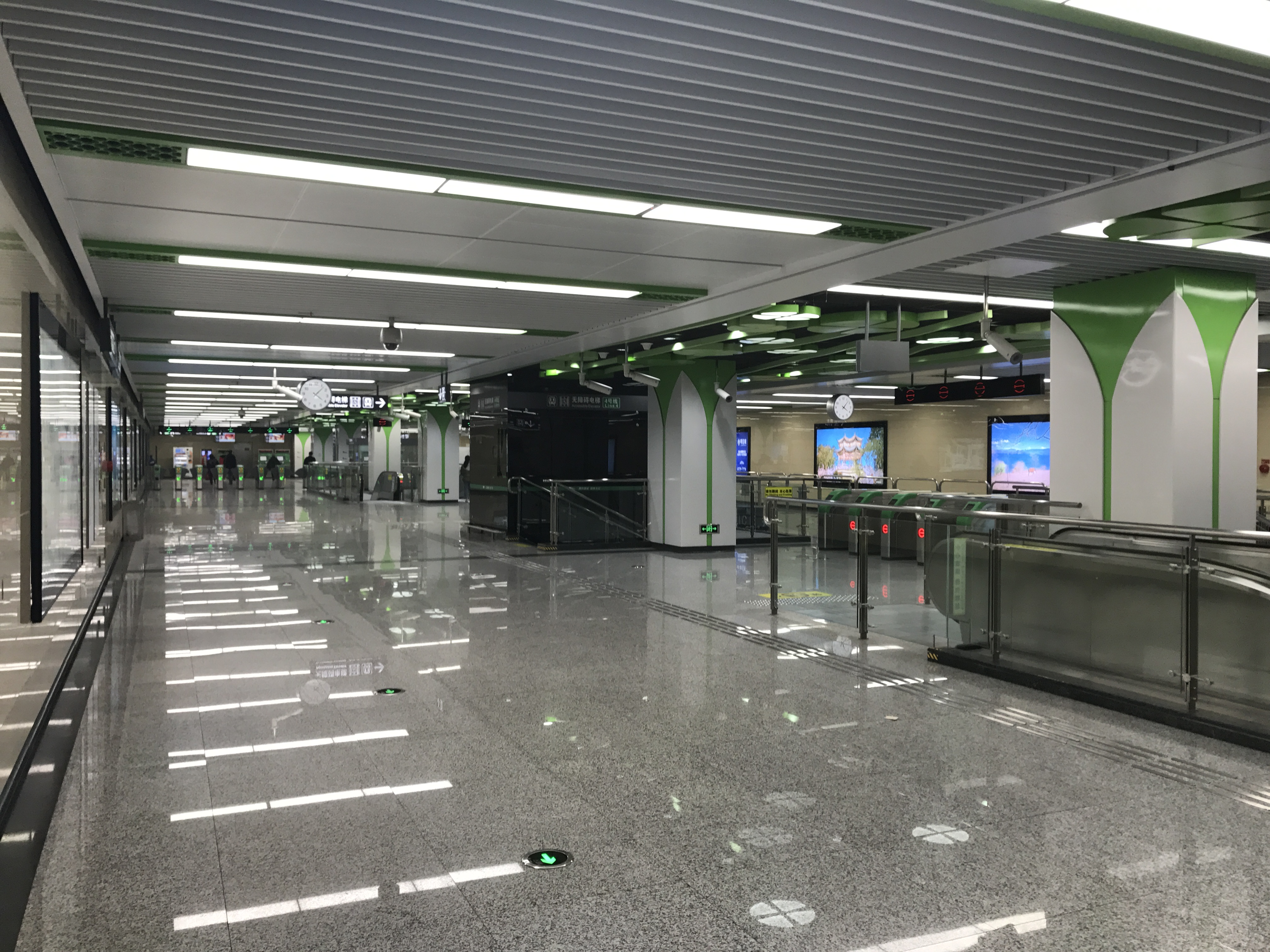
Concourse

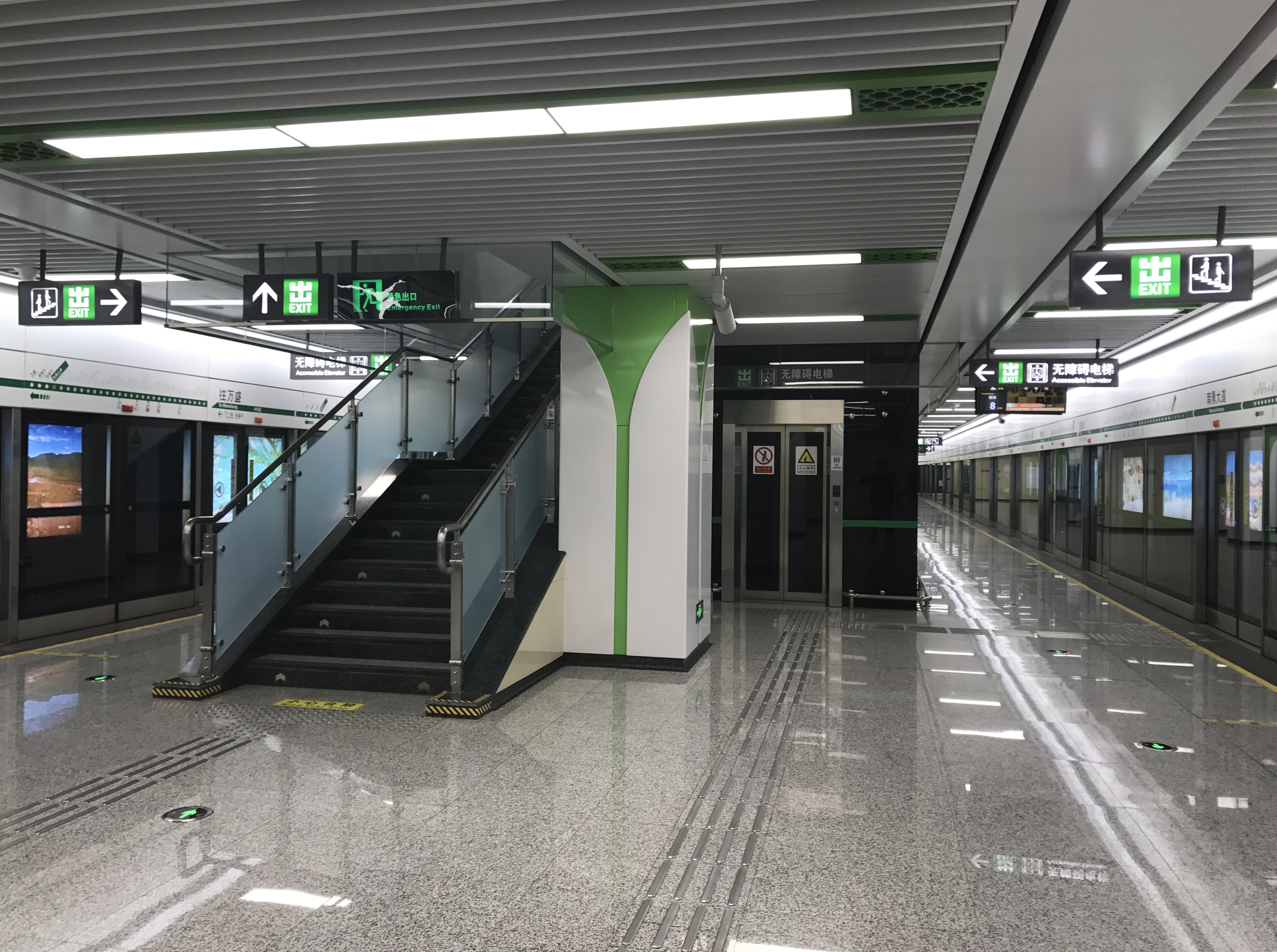
Platform
