= Fengxihe station =

Metro station in Chengdu, China

Fengxihe 凤溪河
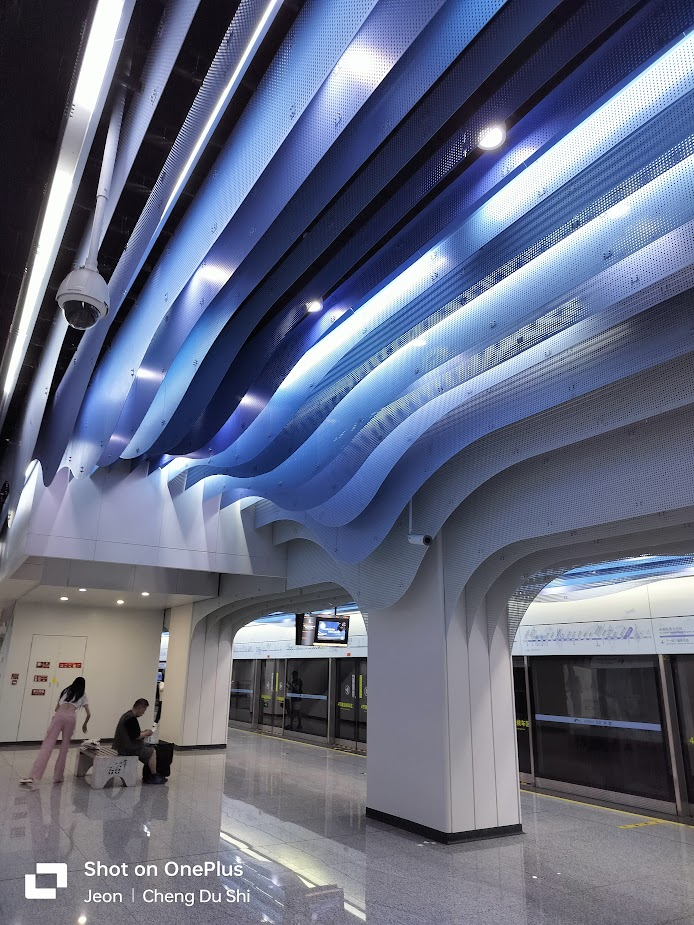
- Line 19 platform

General information
- Location: Wenjiang District, Chengdu, Sichuan; China
- Coordinates: 30.6893°N 103.8419°E
- Operator: Chengdu Metro Limited
- Lines: Line 4 Line 19
- Platforms: 4 (2 island platforms)

Other information
- Station code: 0428 1904

History
- Opened: 2 June 2017

Services
Preceding station	Chengdu Metro	Following station
Yangliuhe towards Wansheng	Line 4	Nanxun Avenue towards Xihe
Chengdu Fifth People's Hospital towards Jinxing	Line 19	Wenquan Avenue towards Tianfu Station
Location

Fengxihe (Chinese: 凤溪河) is a station on Line 4 and Line 19 of the Chengdu Metro in China.

== Station layout ==
G	Entrances and Exits	Exits A, B, D
B1	Concourse	Faregates, Station Agent
B2	Westbound	← Line 4 towards Wansheng (Yangliuhe)
B2	Island platform, doors open on the left
B2	Eastbound	Line 4 towards Xihe (Nanxun Avenue) →
B3	Northbound	← Line 19 towards Jinxing (Chengdu Fifth People's Hospital)
B3	Island platform, doors open on the left
B3	Southbound	Line 19 towards Tianfu International Airport North (Wenquan Avenue) →
