= Machangba station =

Metro station in Chengdu, China

Machangba 马厂坝
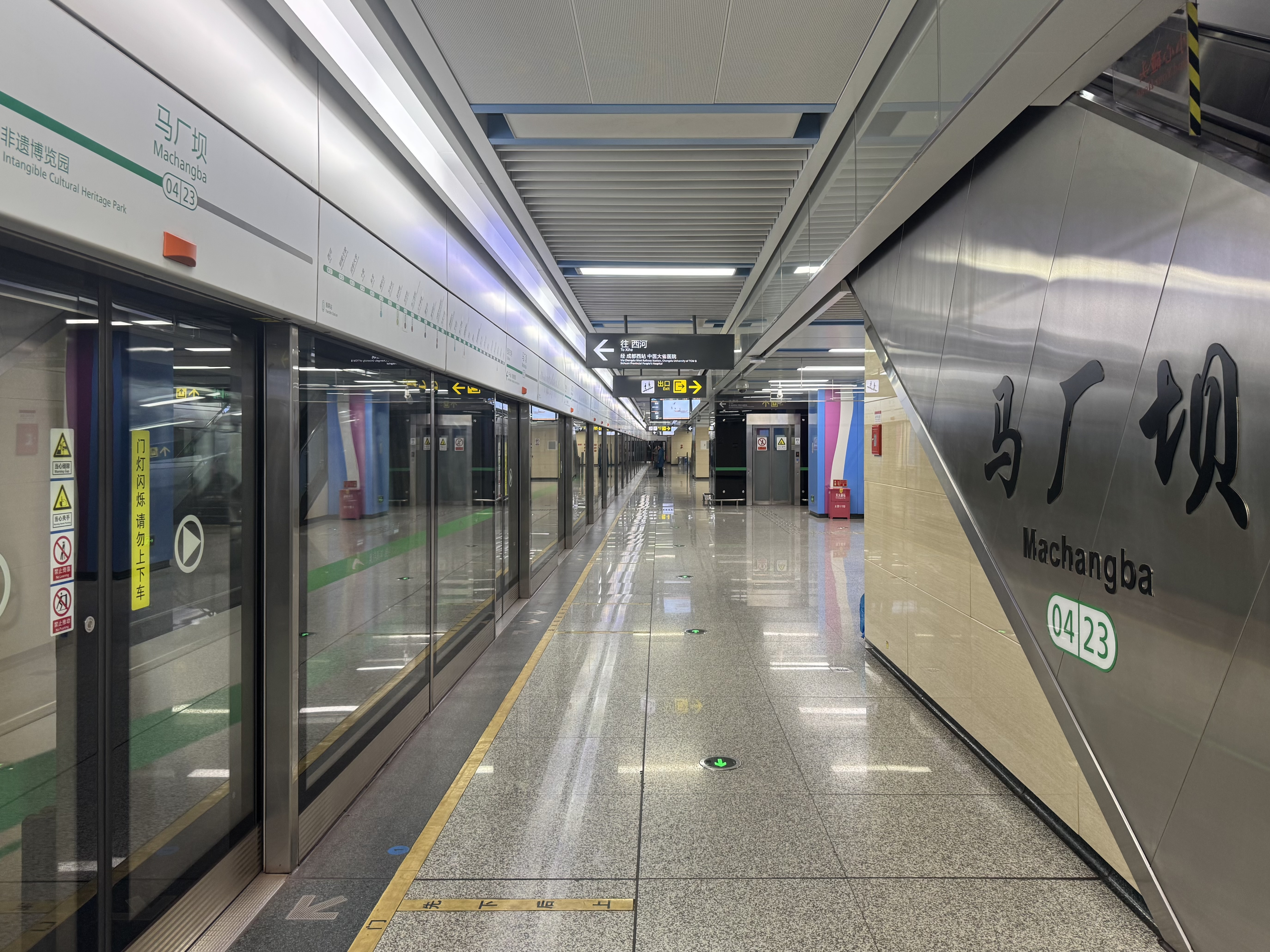

General information
- Location: Wenjiang District, Chengdu, Sichuan; China
- Operator: Chengdu Metro Limited
- Line: Line 4
- Platforms: 2 (1 island platform)

Other information
- Station code: 0423

History
- Opened: 2 June 2017

Services
Preceding station	Chengdu Metro	Following station
Fenghuang Street towards Wansheng	Line 4	Intangible Cultural Heritage Park towards Xihe
Location

Machangba (Chinese: 马厂坝) is a station on Line 4 of the Chengdu Metro in China.

== Station layout ==
G	Entrances and Exits	Exits A, C, D
B1	Concourse	Faregates, Station Agent
B2	Westbound	← Line 4 towards Wansheng (Fenghuang Street)
B2	Island platform, doors open on the left
B2	Easthbound	Line 4 towards Xihe (Intangible Cultural Heritage Park) →

== Gallery ==
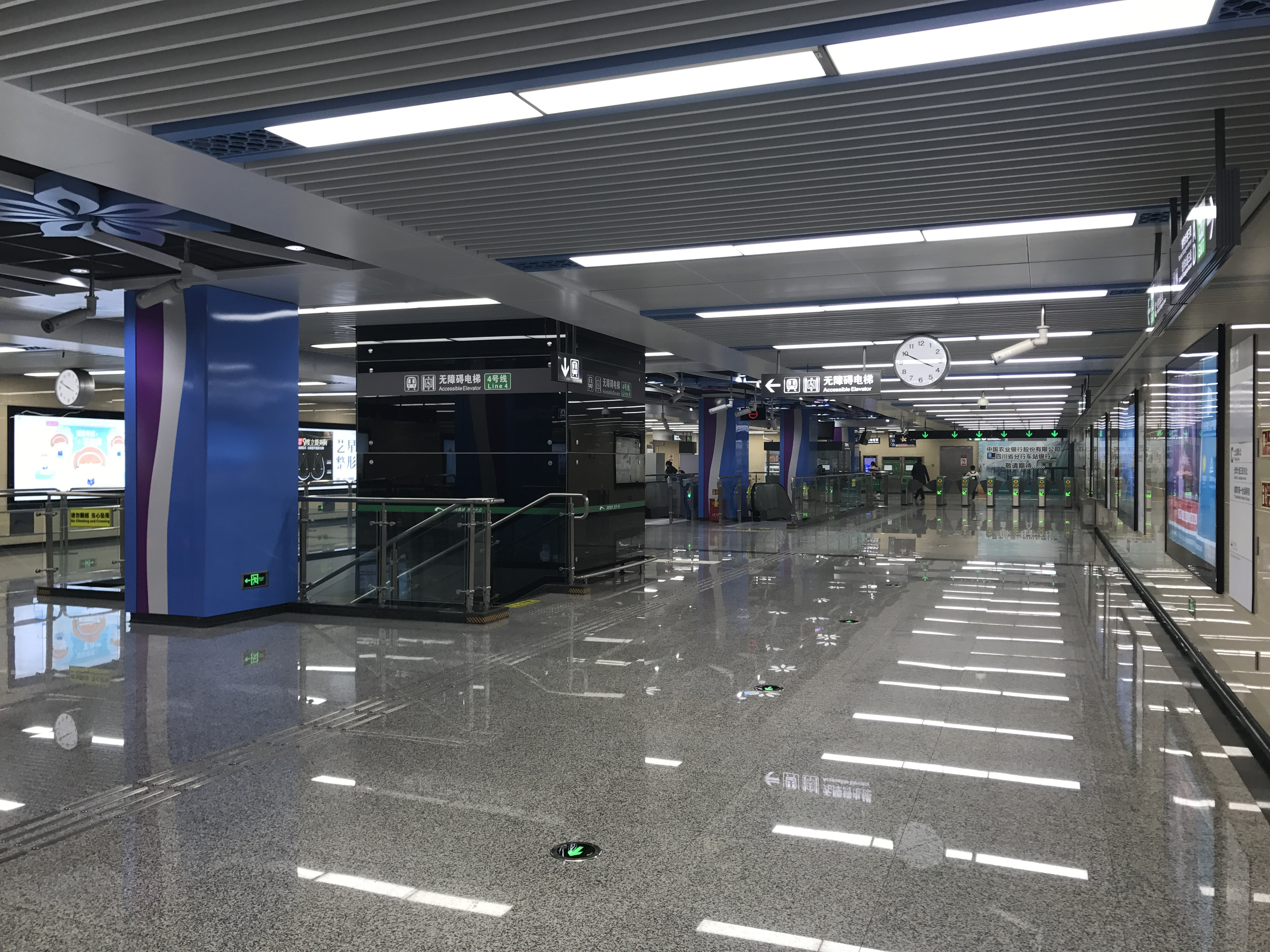
Concourse

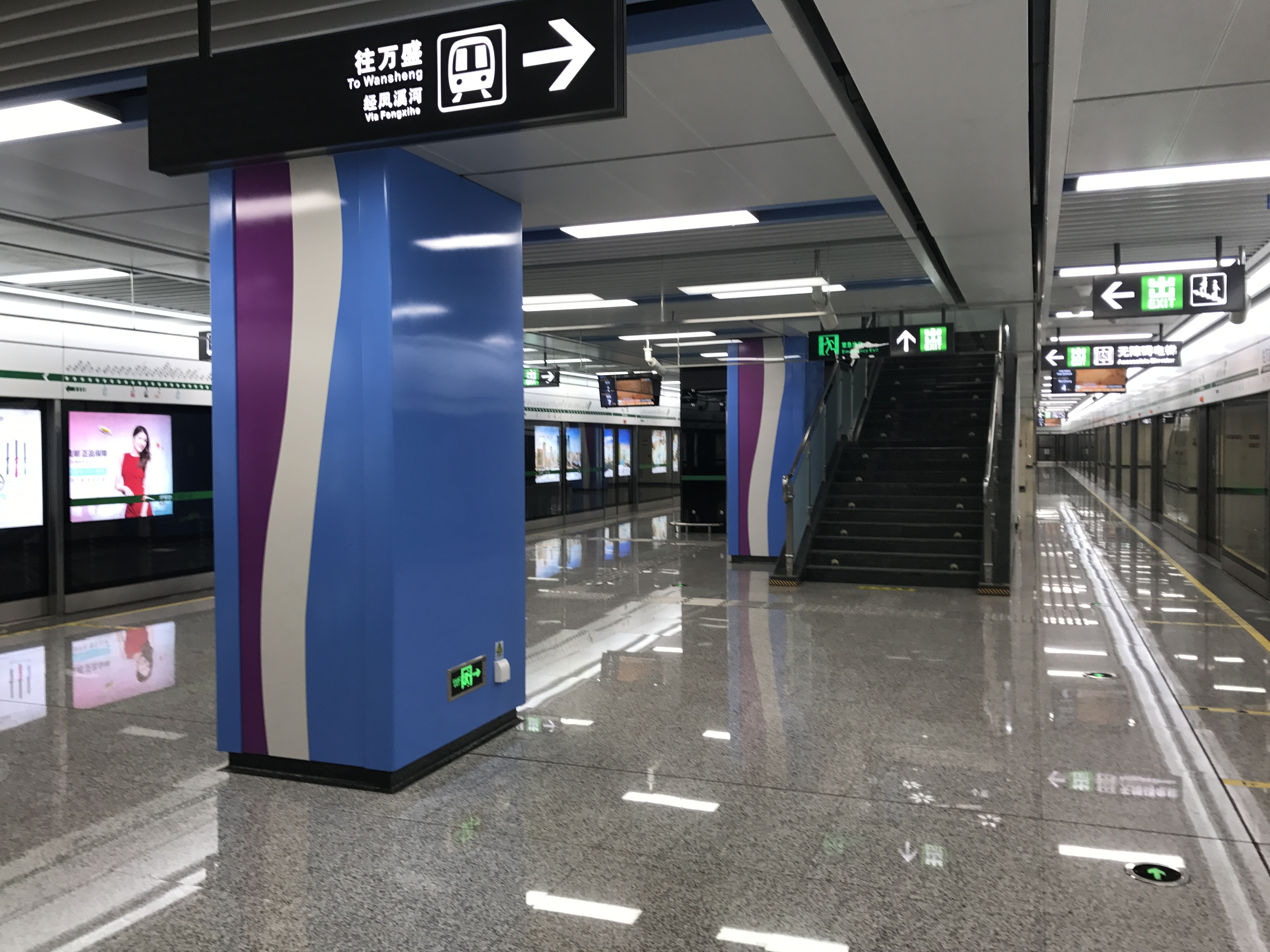
Platform
