= Guanghua Park station =

Metro station in Chengdu, China

Guanghua Park 光华公园
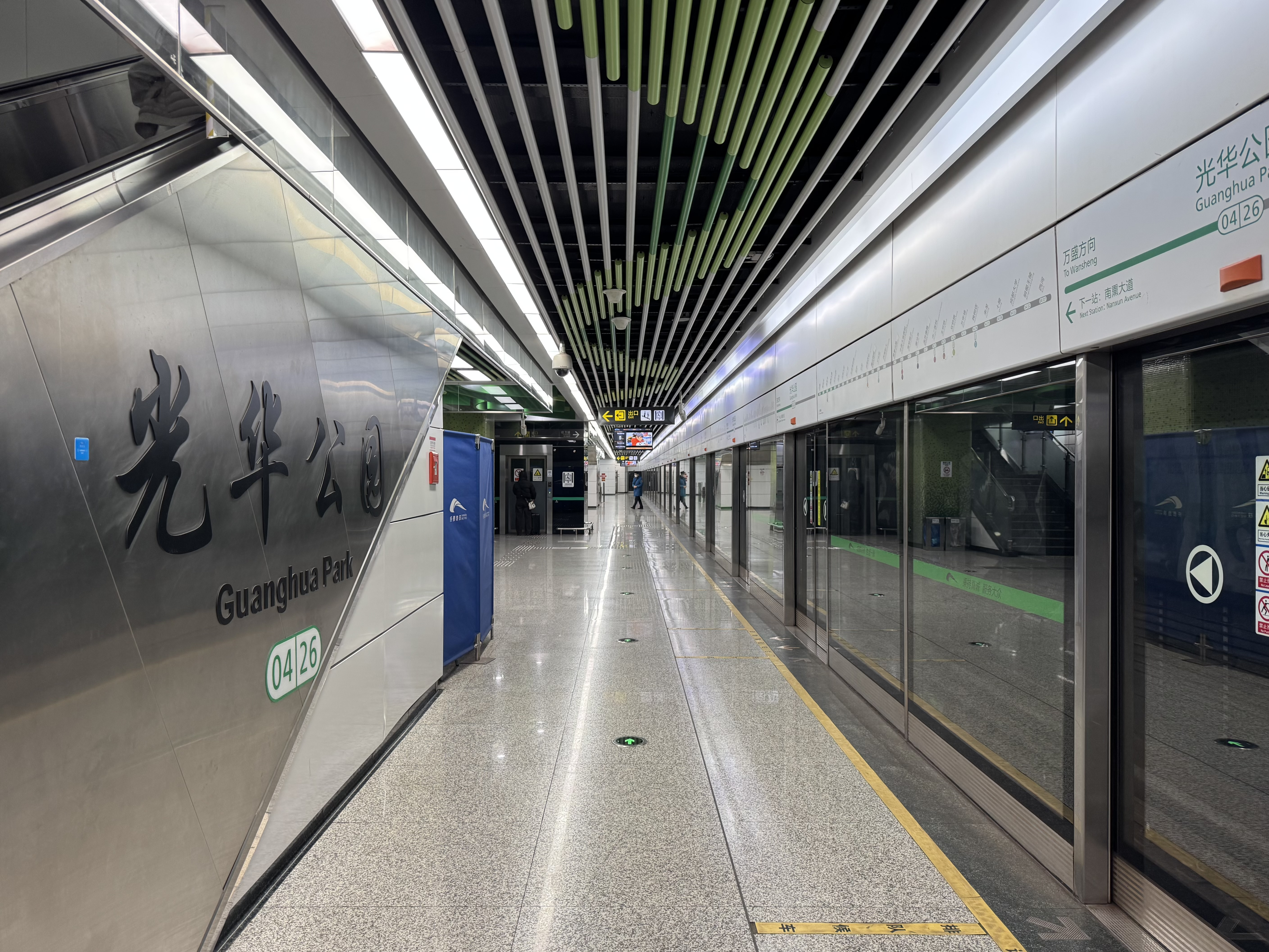

General information
- Location: Wenjiang District, Chengdu, Sichuan; China
- Operator: Chengdu Metro Limited
- Line: Line 4
- Platforms: 2 (1 island platform)

Other information
- Station code: 0426

History
- Opened: 2 June 2017

Services
Preceding station	Chengdu Metro	Following station
Nanxun Avenue towards Wansheng	Line 4	Yongquan towards Xihe
Location

Guanghua Park (Chinese: 光华公园) is a station on Line 4 of the Chengdu Metro in China.

== Station layout ==
G	Entrances and Exits	Exits A-D
B1	Concourse	Faregates, Station Agent
B2	Westbound	← Line 4 towards Wansheng (Nanxun Avenue)
B2	Island platform, doors open on the left
B2	Easthbound	Line 4 towards Xihe (Yongquan) →

== Gallery ==
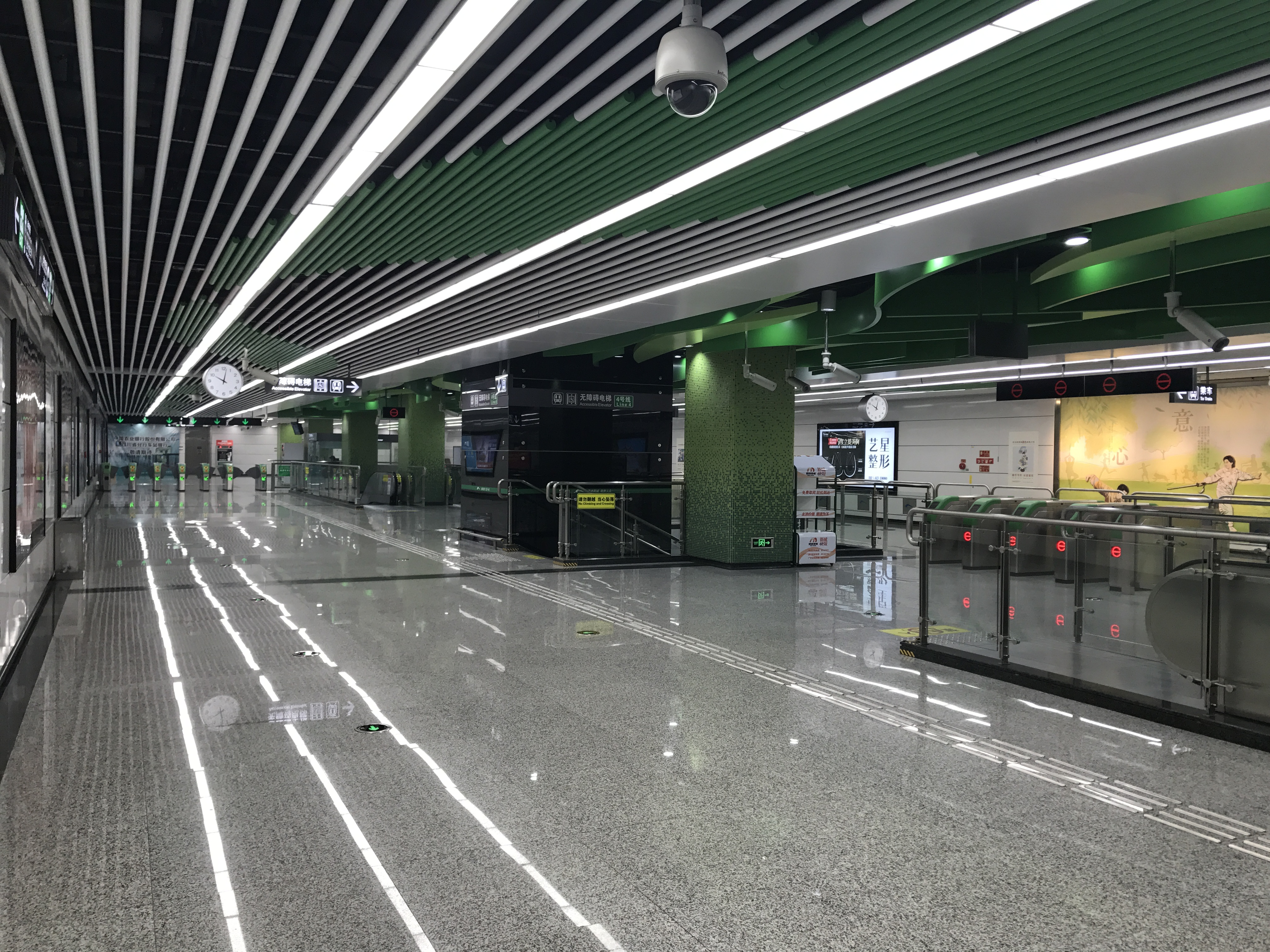
Concourse

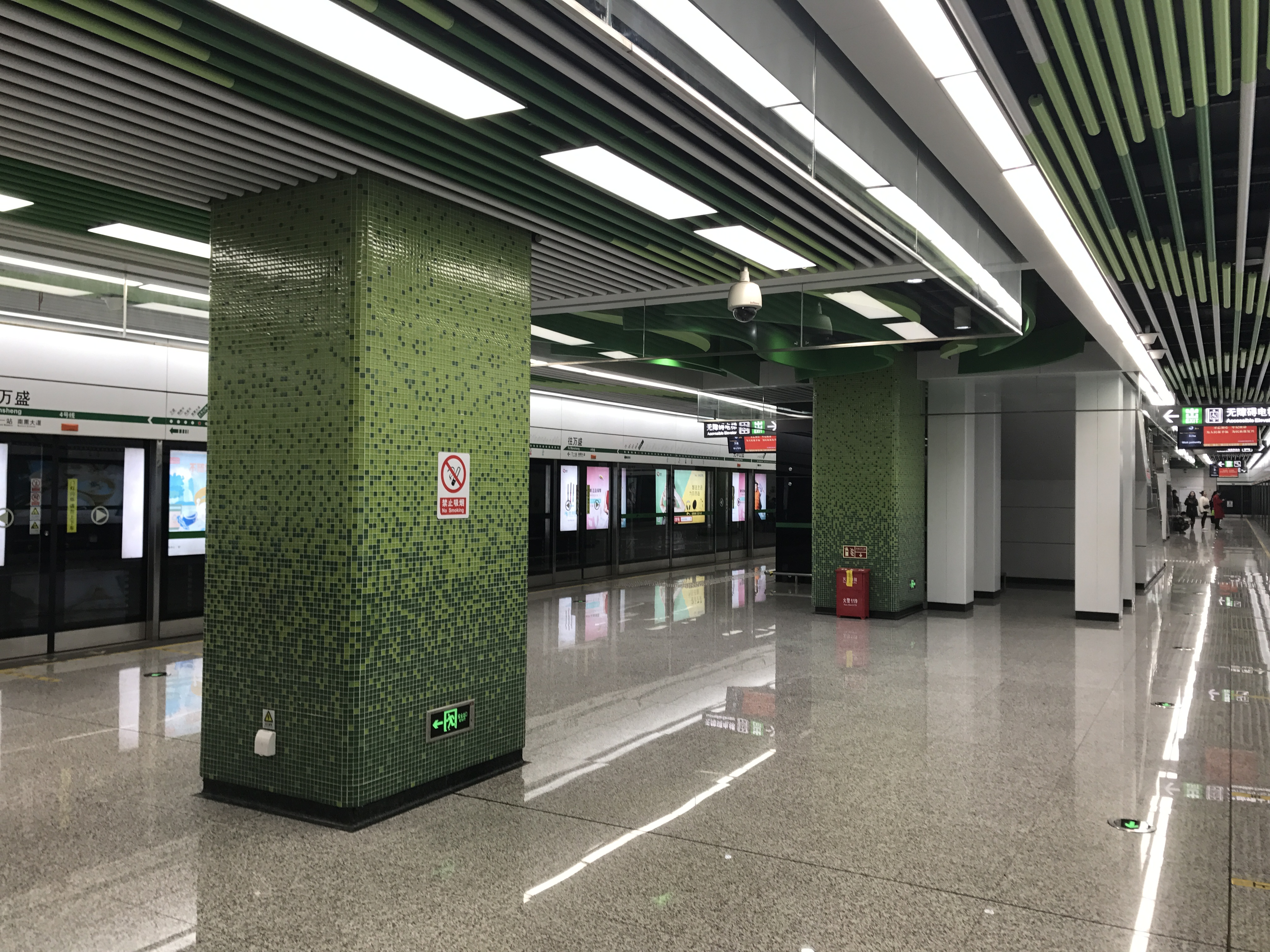
Platform
