= Fenghuang Street station =

Metro station in Chengdu, China

Fenghuang Street 凤凰大街
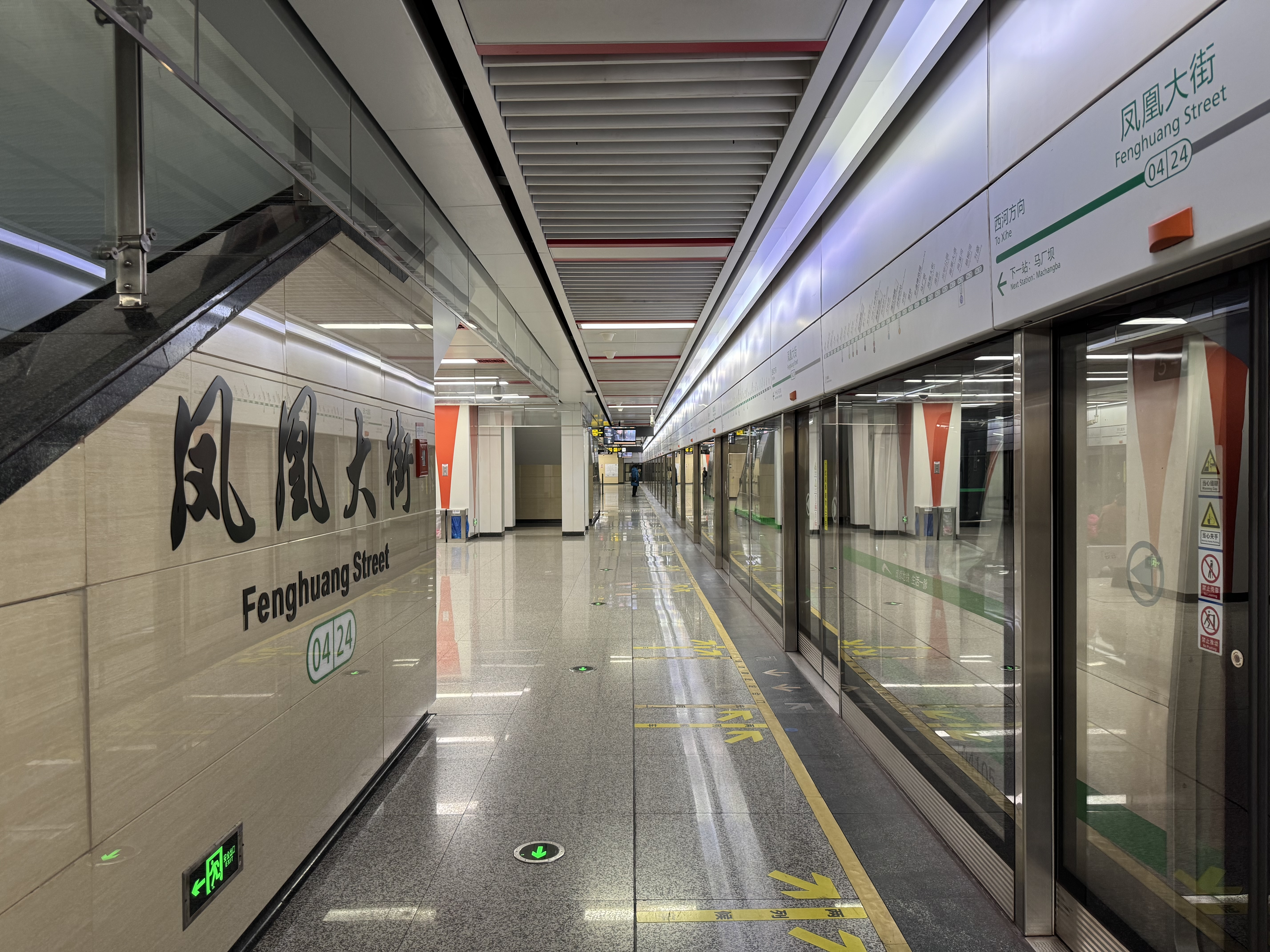

General information
- Location: Wenjiang District, Chengdu, Sichuan; China
- Operator: Chengdu Metro Limited
- Line: Line 4
- Platforms: 2 (1 island platform)

Other information
- Station code: 0424

History
- Opened: 2 June 2017

Services
Preceding station	Chengdu Metro	Following station
Yongquan towards Wansheng	Line 4	Machangba towards Xihe
Location

Fenghuang Street (Chinese: 凤凰大街) is a station on Line 4 of the Chengdu Metro in China.

== Station layout ==
G	Entrances and exits	Exits C, D
B1	Concourse	Faregates, station agent
B2	Westbound	← Line 4 towards Wansheng (Yongquan)
B2	Island platform, doors open on the left
B2	Eastbound	Line 4 towards Xihe (Machangba) →
