= Zhongba station =

Metro station in Chengdu, China

Coordinates: 30.676°N 103.96187°E

Zhongba 中坝

General information
- Location: Qingyang District, Chengdu, Sichuan; China
- Operated by: Chengdu Metro Limited
- Line(s): Line 4
- Platforms: 2 (1 island platform)

Other information
- Station code: 0420

History
- Opened: 26 December 2015

Services
| Preceding station | Chengdu Metro | Following station |
|---|---|---|
| Caiqiao towards Wansheng | Line 4 | Chengdu West Railway Station towards Xihe |

Zhongba (Chinese: 中坝) is a station on Line 4 of the Chengdu Metro in China.

== Station layout ==
| G | Entrances and Exits | Exits A, B, D |
| B1 | Concourse | Faregates, Station Agent |
| B2 | Westbound | ← Line 4 towards Wansheng (Caiqiao) |
| B2 | Island platform, doors open on the left |
| B2 | Easthbound | Line 4 towards Xihe (Chengdu West Railway Station) → |
