= Caiqiao station =

Metro station in Chengdu, China

Caiqiao 蔡桥
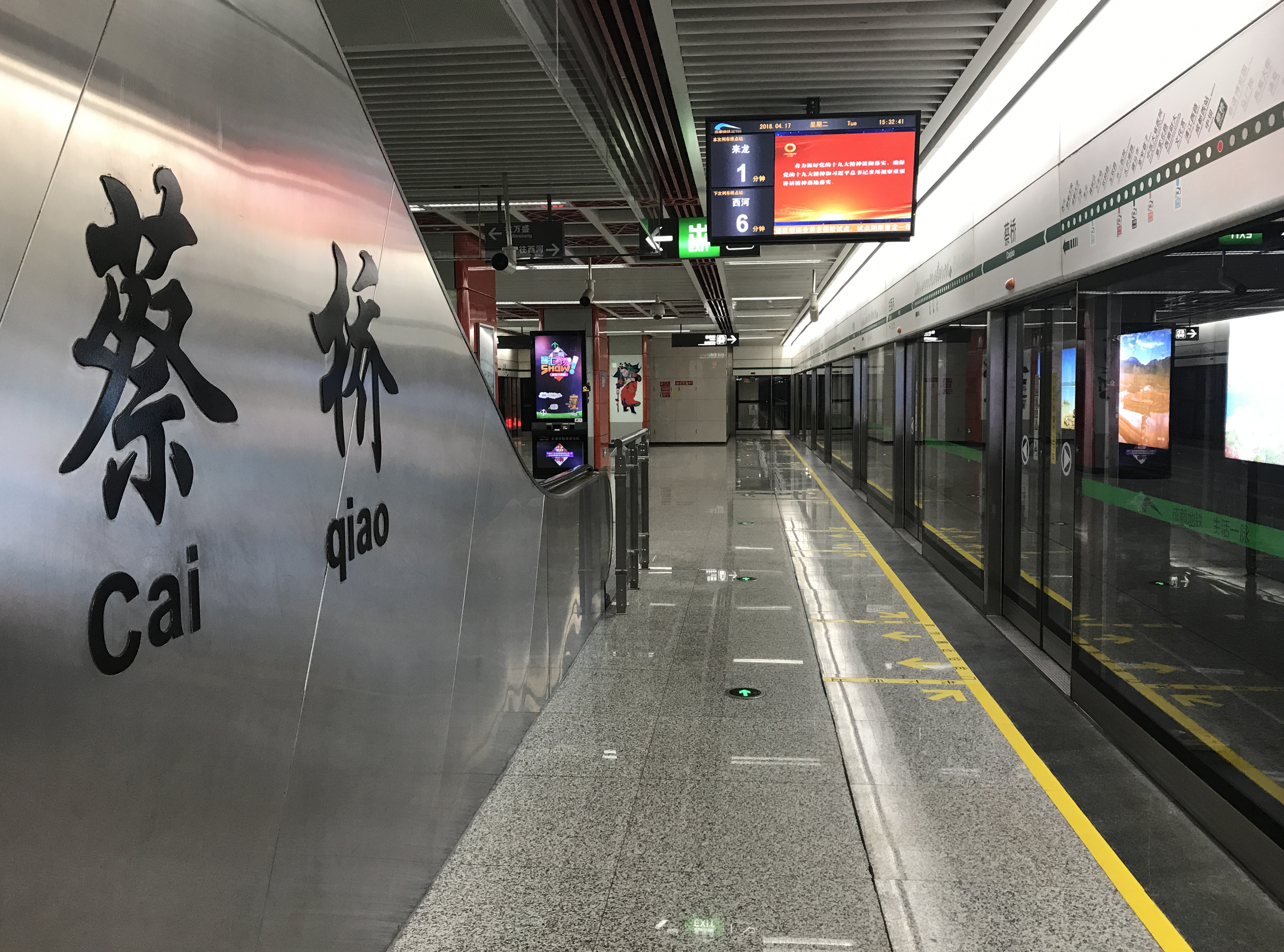

General information
- Location: Qingyang District, Chengdu, Sichuan; China
- Coordinates: 30.67213°N 103.94293°E
- Operated by: Chengdu Metro Limited
- Line(s): Line 4
- Platforms: 2 (1 island platform)

Other information
- Station code: 0421

History
- Opened: 26 December 2015

Services
Preceding station	Chengdu Metro	Following station
Intangible Cultural Heritage Park towards Wansheng	Line 4	Zhongba towards Xihe

Caiqiao (Chinese: 蔡桥) is a station on Line 4 of the Chengdu Metro in China.

== Station layout ==
G	Entrances and Exits	Exits A-C
B1	Concourse	Faregates, Station Agent
B2	Westbound	← Line 4 towards Wansheng (Intangible Cultural Heritage Park)
B2	Island platform, doors open on the left
B2	Easthbound	Line 4 towards Xihe (Zhongba) →

== Gallery ==
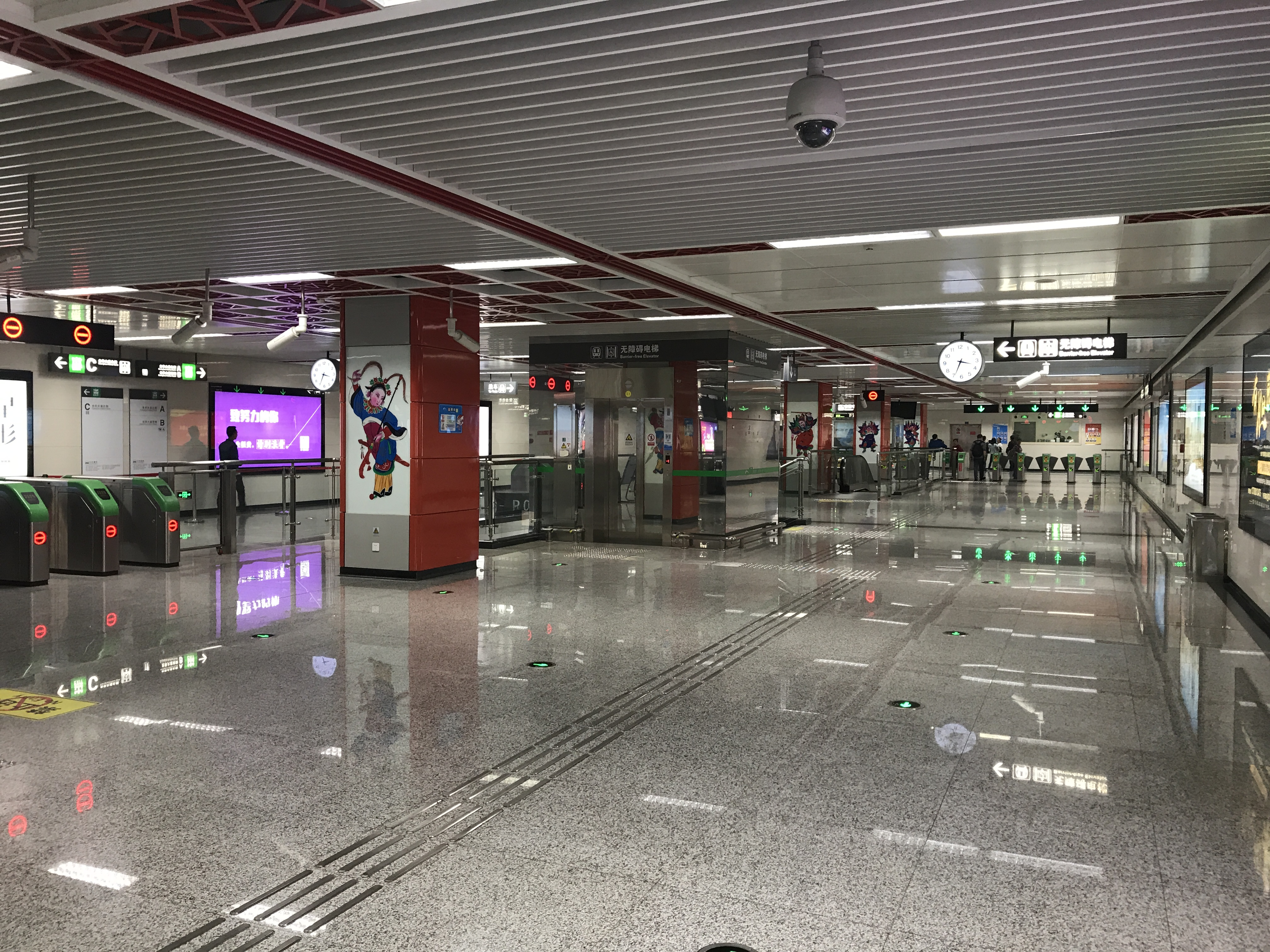
Concourse

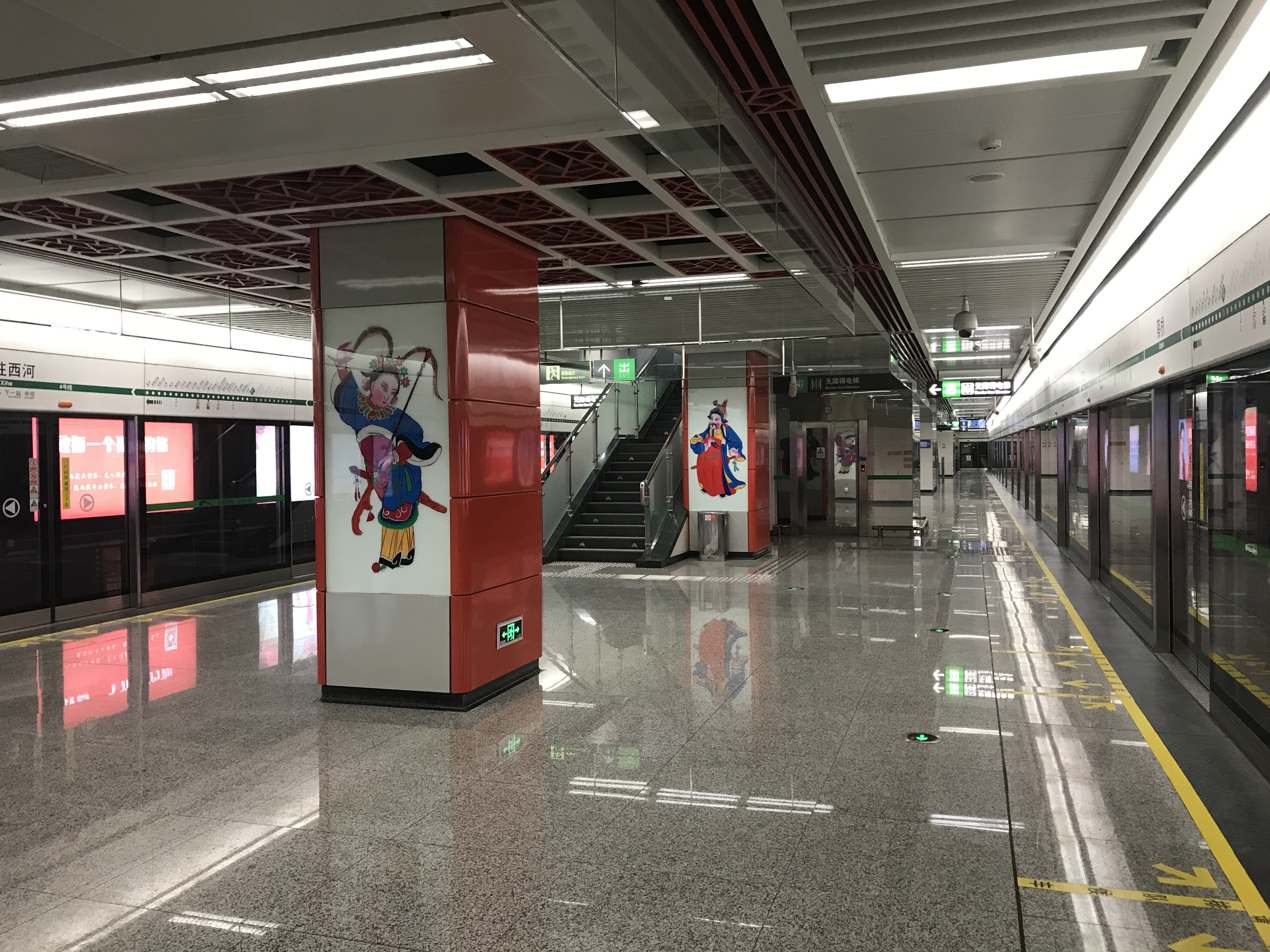
Platform
