= Yangliuhe station =

Metro station in Chengdu

Yangliuhe 杨柳河
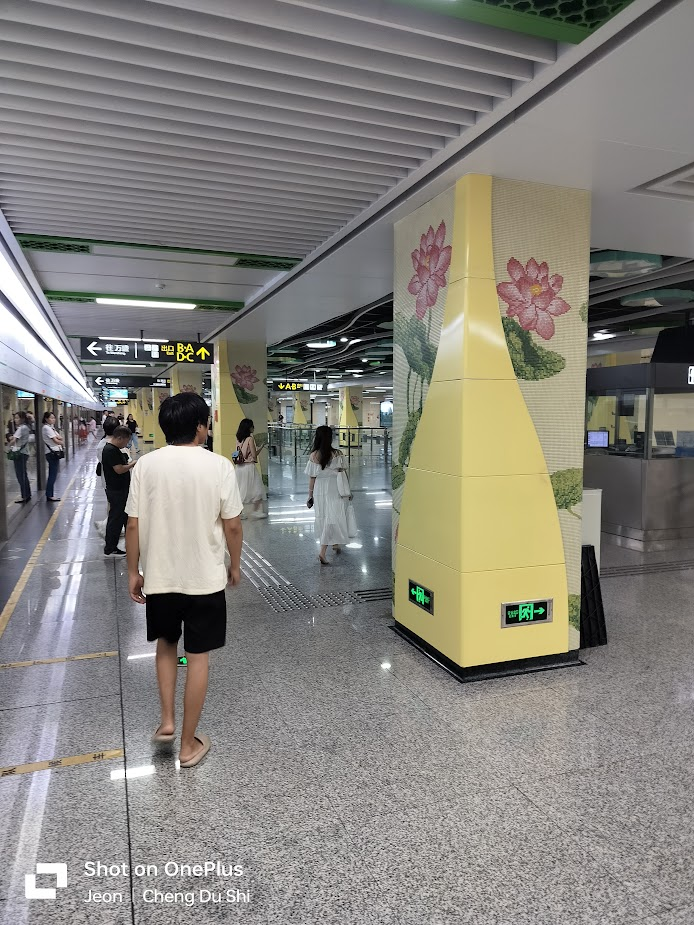

General information
- Location: Wenjiang District, Chengdu, Sichuan; China
- Operator: Chengdu Metro Limited
- Line: Line 4
- Platforms: 2 (2 side platforms)

Other information
- Station code: 0429

History
- Opened: 2 June 2017

Services
Preceding station	Chengdu Metro	Following station
Wansheng Terminus	Line 4	Fengxihe towards Xihe
Location

Yangliuhe (Chinese: 杨柳河) is a station on Line 4 of the Chengdu Metro in China.

== Station layout ==
G	Entrances and Exits	Exits A-D
B1	Concourse	Faregates, Station Agent
B1	Side platform, doors open on the right
B1	Westbound	← Line 4 towards Wansheng (Terminus)
B1	Easthbound	Line 4 towards Xihe (Fengxihe) →
B1	Side platform, doors open on the right
B1	Concourse	Faregates, Station Agent
B2	Underpass
