= Taisheng South Road station =

Metro station in Chengdu, China

Taisheng South Road 太升南路
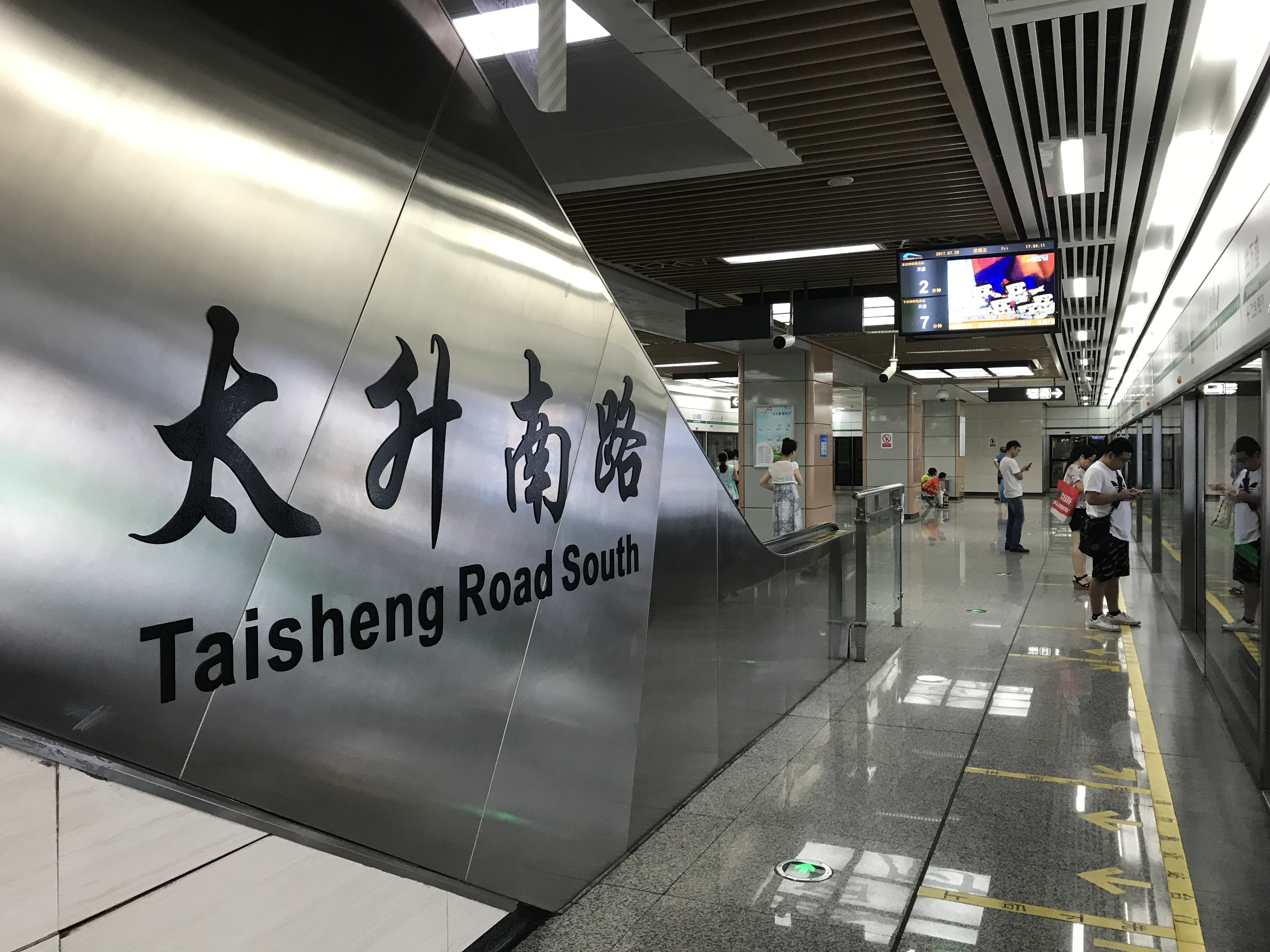

General information
- Location: Qingyang District, Chengdu, Sichuan; China
- Operated by: Chengdu Metro Limited
- Line: Line 4
- Platforms: 2 (1 island platform)

Other information
- Station code: 0411

History
- Opened: 26 December 2015
- Previous names: Taisheng Road South

Services
Preceding station	Chengdu Metro	Following station
Luomashi towards Wansheng	Line 4	Chengdu Second People's Hospital towards Xihe
Location

Taisheng South Road (Chinese: 太升南路), formerly known as Taisheng Road South, is a station on Line 4 of the Chengdu Metro in China.

== Station layout ==
G	Entrances and Exits	Exits B-D
B1	Concourse	Faregates, Station Agent
B2	Westbound	← Line 4 towards Wansheng (Luomashi)
B2	Island platform, doors open on the left
B2	Easthbound	Line 4 towards Xihe (Chengdu Second People's Hospital) →

== Gallery ==
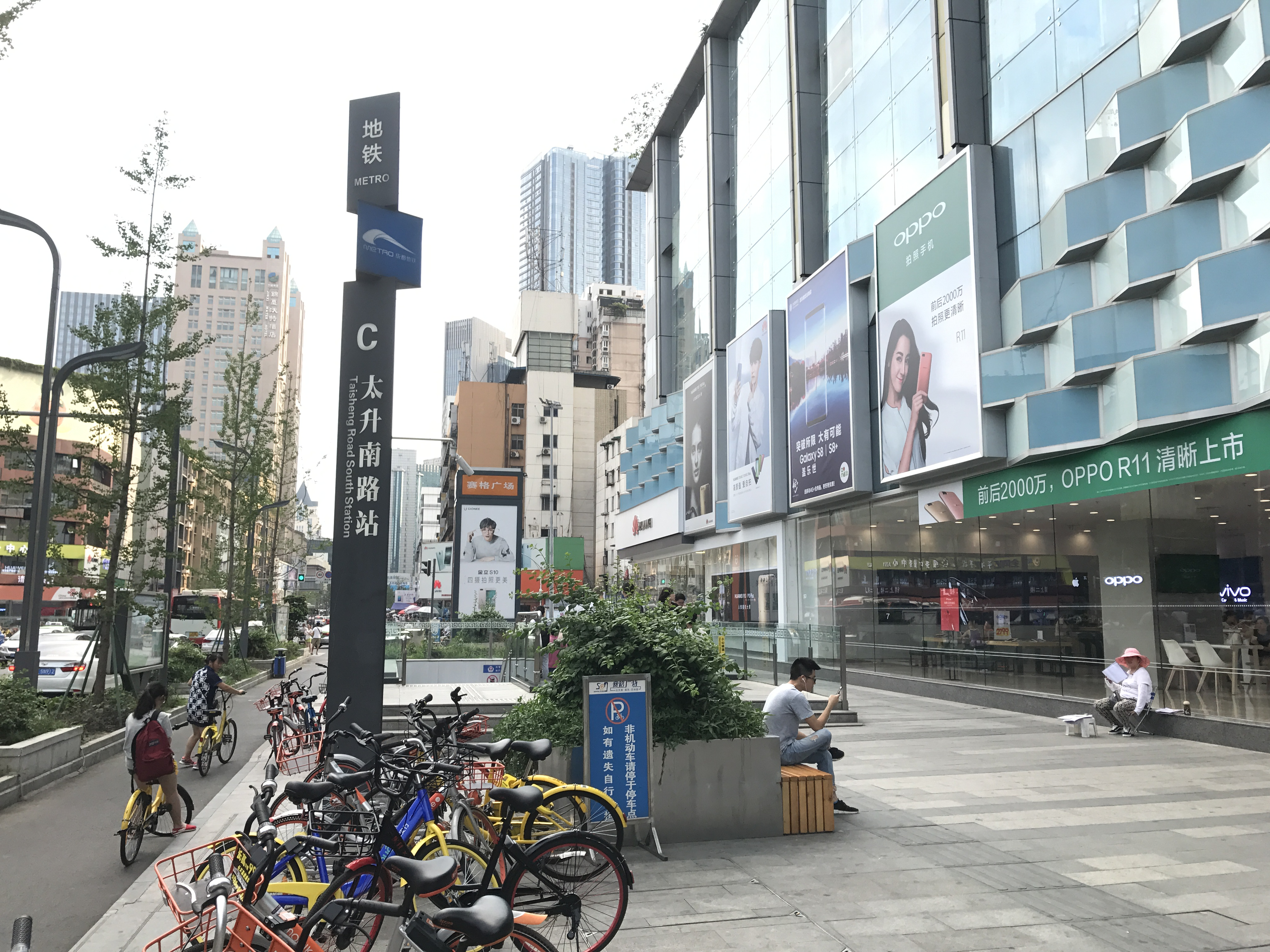
Entrance C

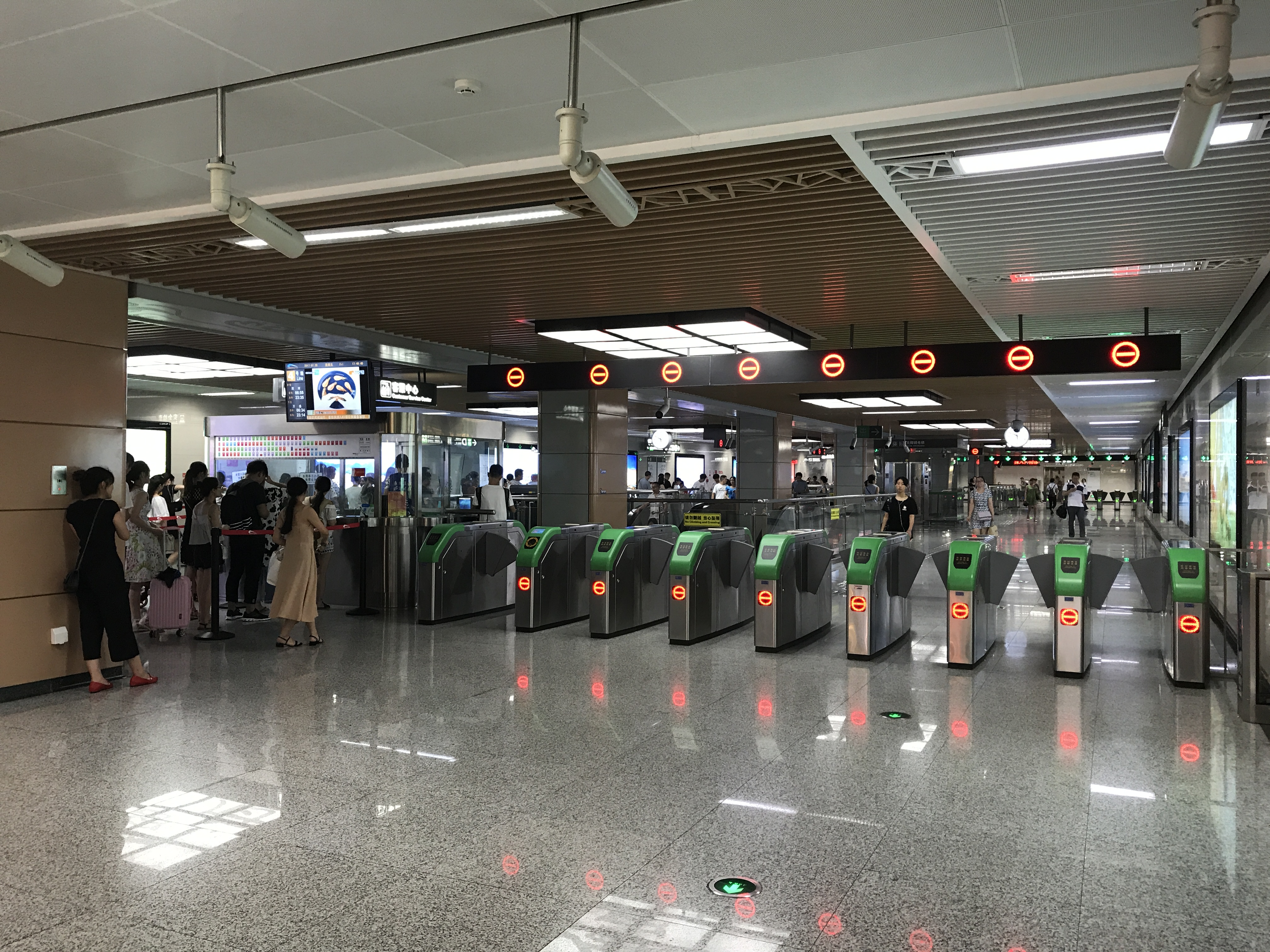
Concourse

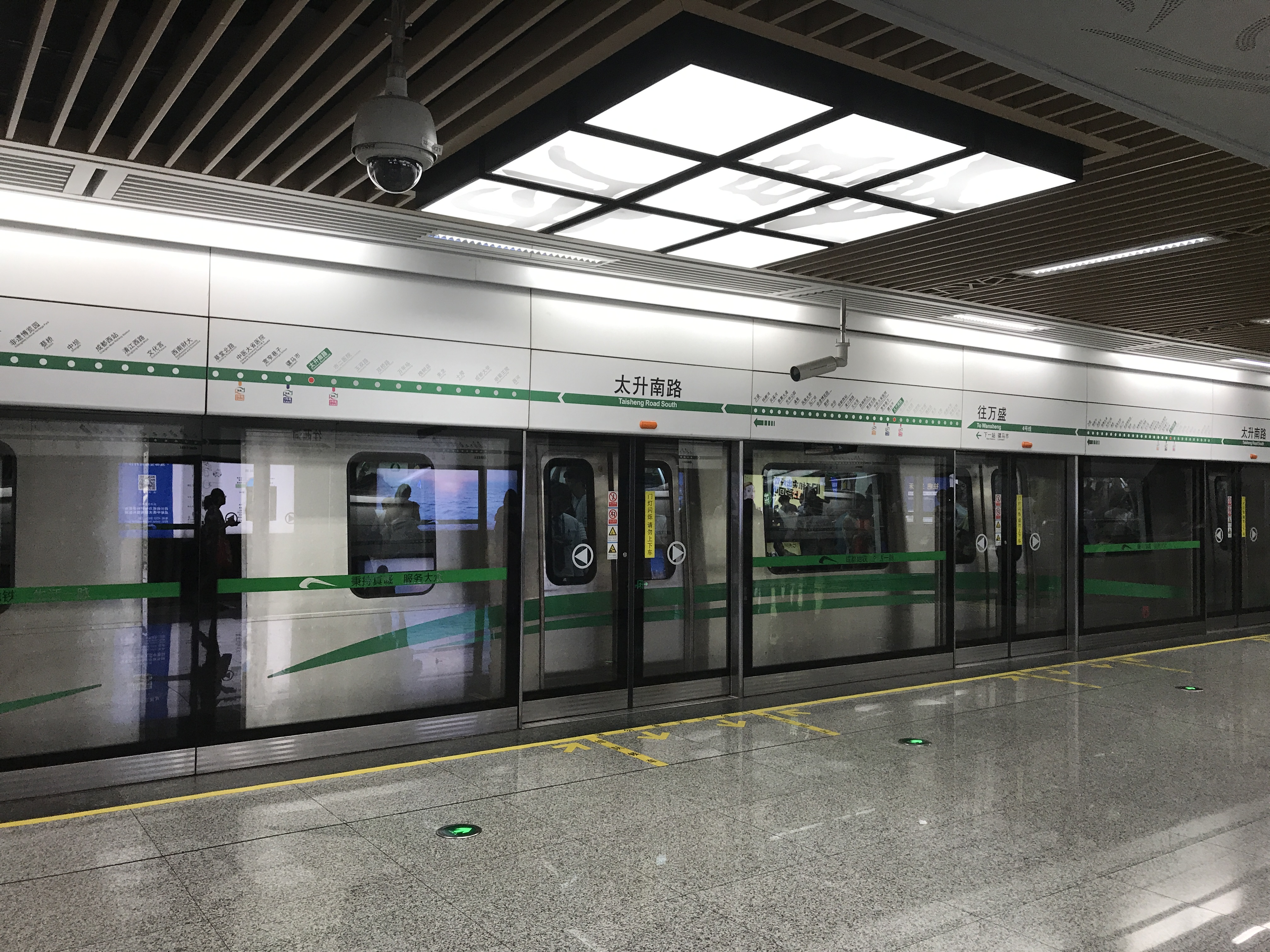
Platform
