= Intangible Cultural Heritage Park station =

Metro station in Chengdu, China

Intangible Cultural Heritage Park 非遗博览园
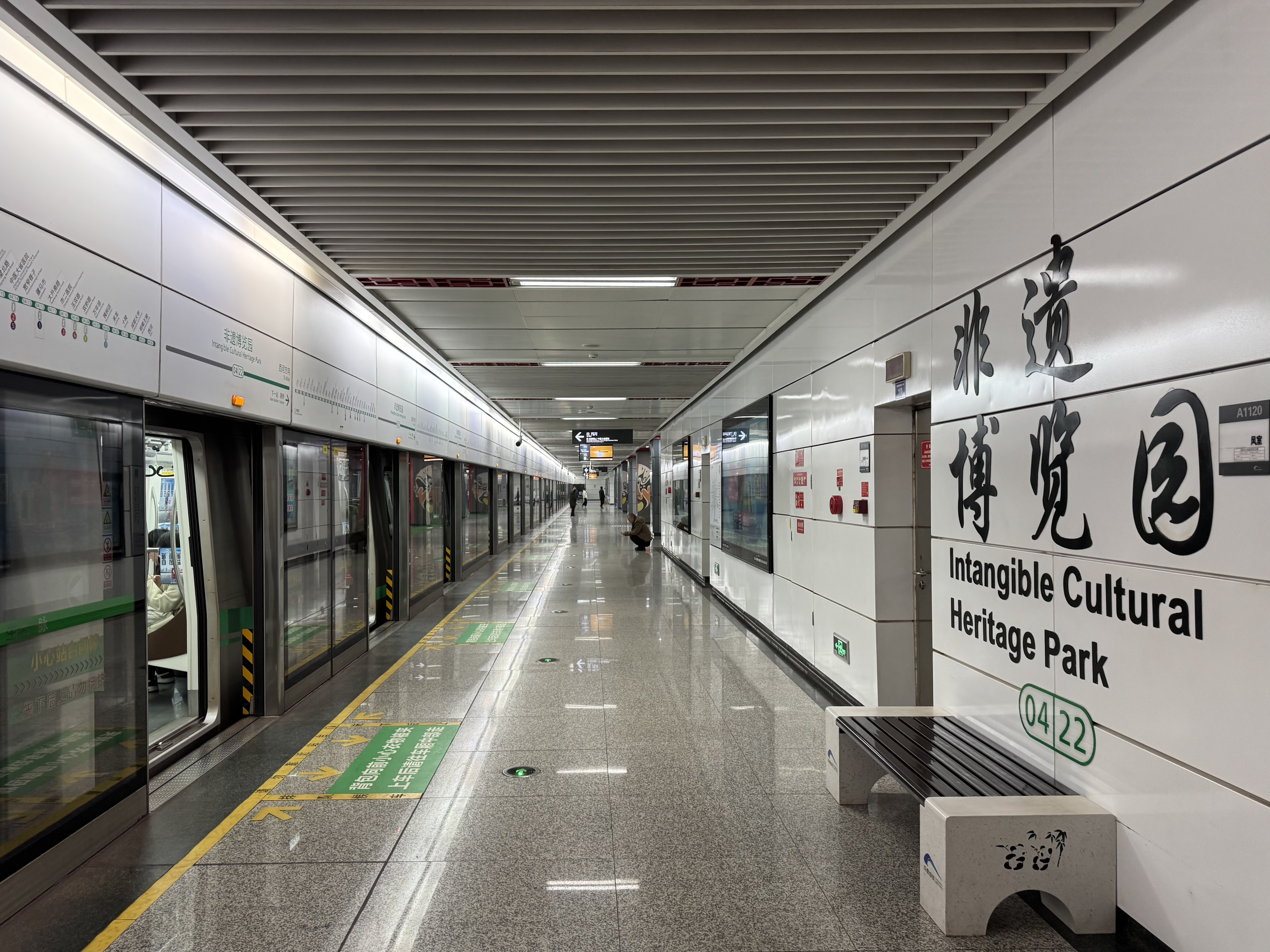

General information
- Location: Qingyang District, Chengdu, Sichuan; China
- Coordinates: 30.67673°N 103.92043°E
- Operated by: Chengdu Metro Limited
- Line: Line 4
- Platforms: 2 (2 side platforms)

Other information
- Station code: 0422

History
- Opened: 26 December 2015

Services
Preceding station	Chengdu Metro	Following station
Machangba towards Wansheng	Line 4	Caiqiao towards Xihe
Location

Intangible Cultural Heritage Park (Chinese: 非遗博览园) is a station on Line 4 of the Chengdu Metro in China.

== Station layout ==
G	Entrances and Exits	Exits A-D
B1	Concourse	Faregates, Station Agent
B1	Side platform, doors open on the right
B1	Westbound	← Line 4 towards Wansheng (Machangba)
B1	Easthbound	Line 4 towards Xihe (Caiqiao) →
B1	Side platform, doors open on the right
B1	Concourse	Faregates, Station Agent
B2	Underpass
