= Line 4 (Chengdu Metro) =

Metro line in Chengdu, China

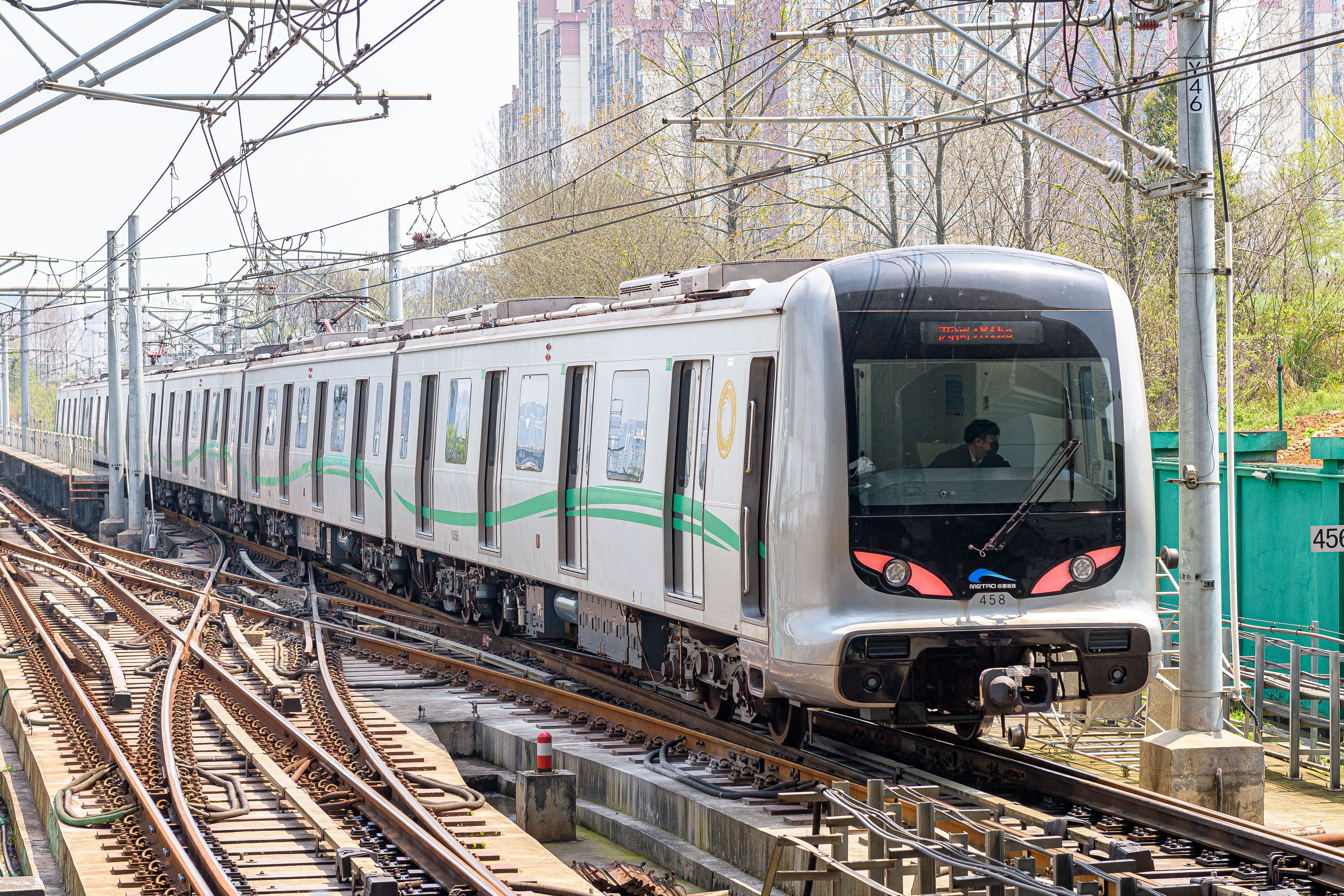
- A Line 4 train reversing at Xihe station

Overview
- Status: Operational
- Owner: Chengdu
- Locale: Chengdu, Sichuan
- Termini: Wansheng; Xihe
- Stations: 30

Service
- Type: Rapid transit
- System: Chengdu Metro
- Services: 1
- Operator(s): Chengdu Metro Limited
- Daily ridership: 698,700 (2018 Peak)

History
- Opened: 26 December 2015; 10 years ago

Technical
- Line length: 43.48 km (27.02 mi)
- Number of tracks: 2
- Character: Underground/Elevated
- Track gauge: 1,435 mm (4 ft 8 1/2 in)
- Operating speed: 80 km/h (50 mph)

Line 4 of the Chengdu Metro (Chinese: 成都地铁4号线; pinyin: Chéngdū Dìtiě Sì Hào Xiàn) is the third line to enter revenue service on the metro network in Chengdu, Sichuan. Line 4 runs in an east-west direction, stretching from Wansheng in Wenjiang to Xihe in the Longquanyi. The first phase started construction on July 22, 2011, and began operation on 26 December 2015. Testing began on the east of west extensions of Line 4 as part of Phase II expansion on December 10, 2016.

== Opening timeline ==
| Segment | Commencement | Length | Station(s) | Name |
|---|---|---|---|---|
| Intangible Cultural Heritage Park — Wannianchang | 26 December 2015 | 22.4 km (13.92 mi) | 16 | Phase 1 |
| Wansheng — Intangible Cultural Heritage Park | 2 June 2017 | 10.8 km (6.71 mi) | 8 | Phase 2 |
| Wannianchang — Xihe | 2 June 2017 | 10.3 km (6.40 mi) | 6 | Phase 2 |

== Stations ==
| Service routes | | Station № | Station name | | Transfer | Distance km | | Borough |
| Service routes | | Station № | English | Chinese | Transfer | Distance km | | Borough |
|---|---|---|---|---|---|---|---|---|
| ● | | 0430 | Wansheng | 万盛 | | 0.00 | 0.00 | Wenjiang |
| ● | | 0429 | Yangliuhe | 杨柳河 | | 1.32 | 1.32 | Wenjiang |
| ● | | 0428 | Fengxihe | 凤溪河 | 19 | 1.42 | 2.74 | Wenjiang |
| ● | | 0427 | Nanxun Avenue | 南熏大道 | | 0.91 | 3.65 | Wenjiang |
| ● | ● | 0426 | Guanghua Park | 光华公园 | | 1.02 | 4.67 | Wenjiang |
| ● | ● | 0425 | Yongquan | 涌泉 | | 1.23 | 5.90 | Wenjiang |
| ● | ● | 0424 | Fenghuang Street | 凤凰大街 | | 1.84 | 7.74 | Wenjiang |
| ● | ● | 0423 | Machangba | 马厂坝 | | 1.52 | 9.26 | Wenjiang |
| ● | ● | 0422 | Intangible Cultural Heritage Park | 非遗博览园 | | 1.63 | 10.89 | Qingyang |
| ● | ● | 0421 | Caiqiao | 蔡桥 | | 2.30 | 13.19 | Qingyang |
| ● | ● | 0420 | Zhongba | 中坝 | | 2.15 | 15.34 | Qingyang |
| ● | ● | 0419 | Chengdu West Railway Station | 成都西站 | 9 CMW T2 | 2.20 | 17.54 | Qingyang |
| ● | ● | 0418 | Qingjiang Road West | 清江西路 | | 2.15 | 19.69 | Qingyang |
| ● | ● | 0417 | Culture Palace | 文化宫 | 7 Chengdu BRT | 1.15 | 20.84 | Qingyang |
| ● | ● | 0416 | Southwestern University of Finance and Economics | 西南财大 | | 1.10 | 21.94 | Qingyang |
| ● | ● | 0415 | Caotang North Road | 草堂北路 | | 0.75 | 22.69 | Qingyang |
| ● | ● | 0414 | Chengdu University of TCM & Sichuan Provincial People's Hospital | 中医大·省医院 | 2 5 | 1.20 | 23.89 | Qingyang |
| ● | ● | 0413 | Kuanzhaixiangzi Alleys | 宽窄巷子 | | 0.90 | 24.79 | Qingyang |
| ● | ● | 0412 | Luomashi | 骡马市 | 1 10 18 | 1.60 | 26.39 | Qingyang |
| ● | ● | 0411 | Taisheng South Road | 太升南路 | | 1.05 | 27.44 | Qingyang |
| ● | ● | 0410 | Chengdu Second People's Hospital | 市二医院 | 3 | 1.40 | 28.84 | Jinjiang |
| ● | ● | 0409 | Yushuang Road | 玉双路 | 6 | 1.45 | 30.29 | Chenghua |
| ● | ● | 0408 | Shuangqiao Road | 双桥路 | 8 | 1.60 | 31.89 | Chenghua |
| ● | ● | 0407 | Wannianchang | 万年场 | | 0.75 | 32.64 | Chenghua |
| ● | ● | 0406 | Huaishudian | 槐树店 | 7 | 2.13 | 34.77 | Chenghua |
| ● | ● | 0405 | Lailong | 来龙 | 9 | 2.30 | 37.07 | Longquanyi |
| ● | | 0404 | Shiling | 十陵 | | 1.00 | 38.07 | Longquanyi |
| ● | | 0403 | Chengdu University | 成都大学 | | 0.90 | 38.97 | Longquanyi |
| ● | | 0402 | Mingshuwangling | 明蜀王陵 | | 1.18 | 40.15 | Longquanyi |
| ● | | 0401 | Xihe | 西河 | | 2.82 | 42.97 | Longquanyi |
