= Mingshuwangling station =

Metro station in Chengdu, China

Mingshuwangling 明蜀王陵
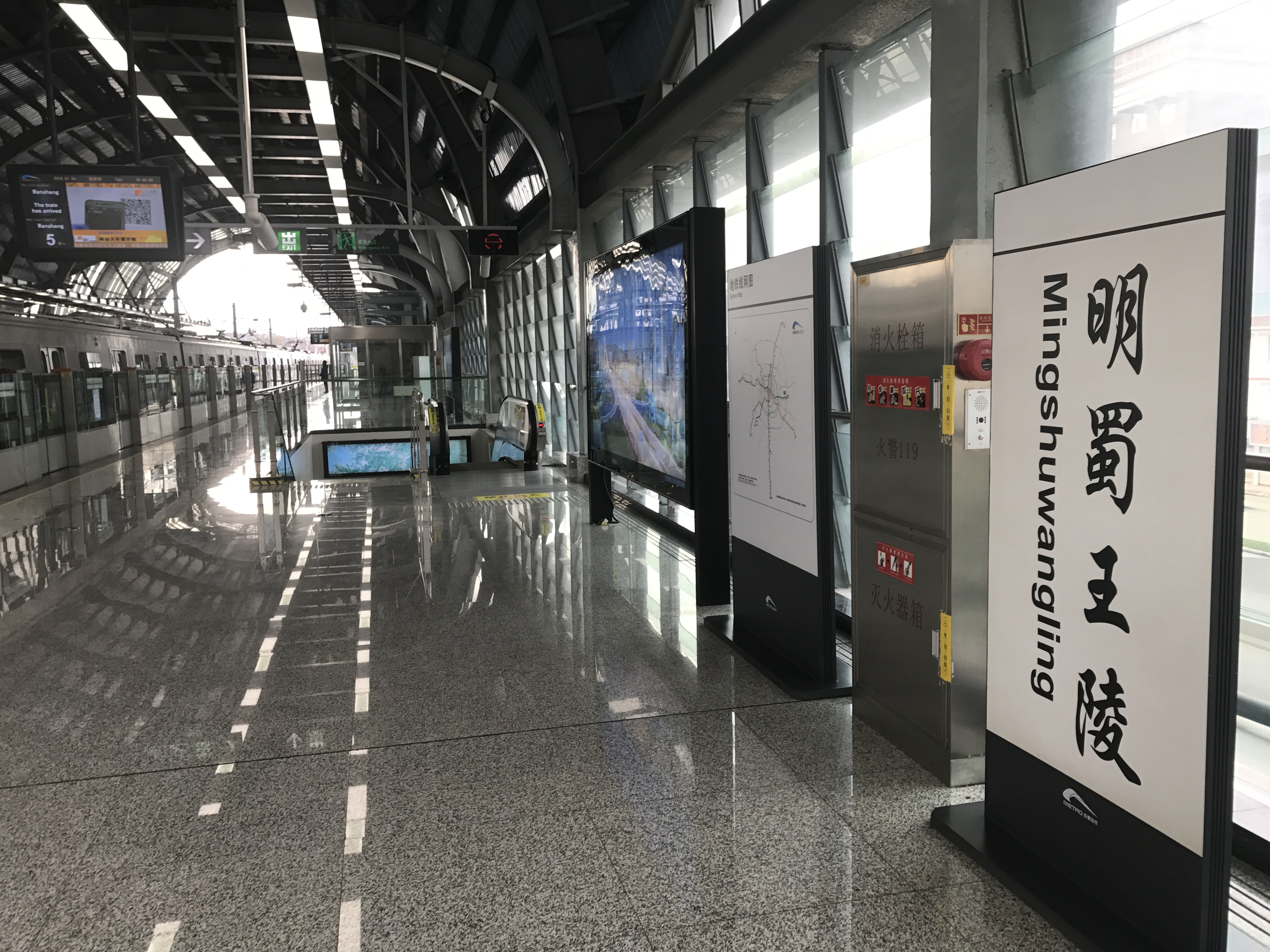

General information
- Location: Longquanyi District, Chengdu, Sichuan; China
- Operator: Chengdu Metro Limited
- Line: Line 4
- Platforms: 2 (2 side platforms)

Other information
- Station code: 0402

History
- Opened: 2 June 2017

Services
Preceding station	Chengdu Metro	Following station
Chengdu University towards Wansheng	Line 4	Xihe Terminus
Location

Mingshuwangling (Chinese: 明蜀王陵) is a station on Line 4 of the Chengdu Metro in China.

== Station layout ==
2F	Side platform, doors open on the right
2F	Westbound	← Line 4 towards Wansheng (Chengdu University)
2F	Easthbound	Line 4 towards Xihe (Terminus) →
2F	Side platform, doors open on the right
G	Entrances and Exits	Exits A, B, Faregates, Station Agent

== Gallery ==
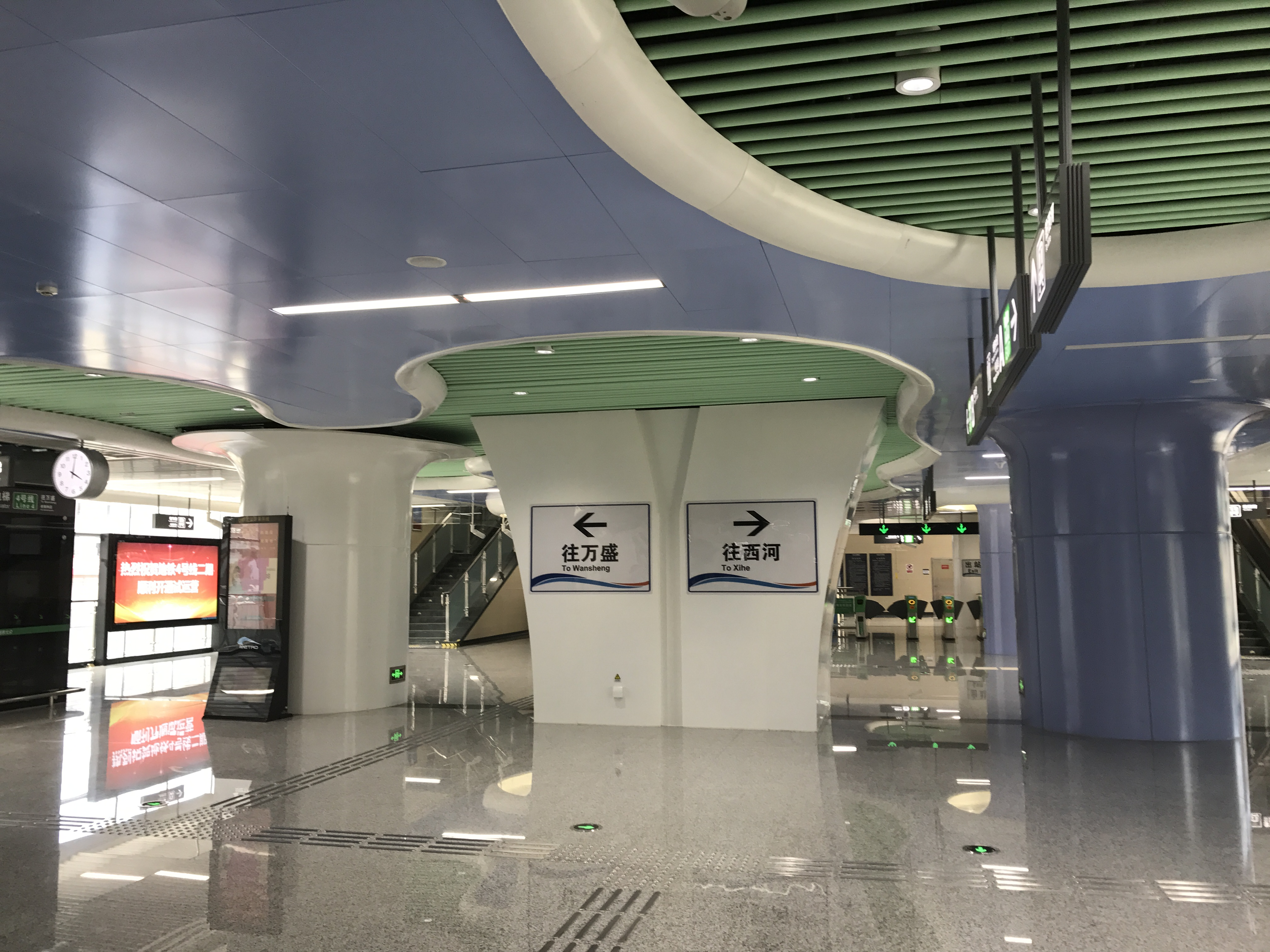
Concourse

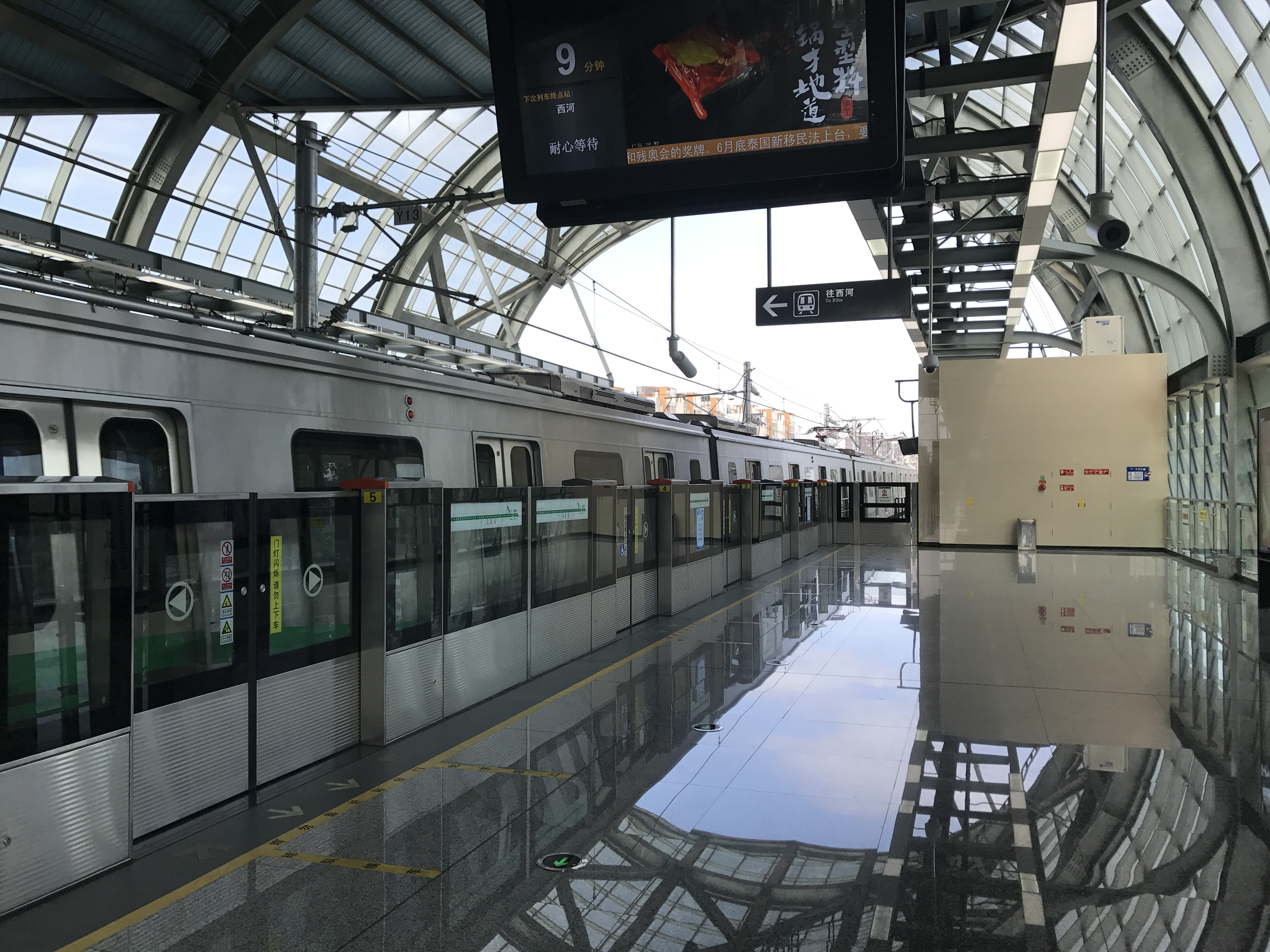
Platform
