= Yongning Subdistrict, Wenjiang District =

Yongning 永宁街道
- Subdistrict
- Location in Sichuan
- Coordinates: 30°41′56″N 103°54′33″E
- Country: People's Republic of China
- Province: Sichuan
- Prefecture-level city: Chengdu
- District: Wenjiang District

Area
  - Total: 23.5 km^{2} (9.1 sq mi)

Population
  - Total: 24,000
  - Density: 1,000/km^{2} (2,600/sq mi)
- Time zone: UTC+8 (China Standard)

Yongning Subdistrict (simplified Chinese: 永宁街道; traditional Chinese: 永寧街道; pinyin: Yǒngníng Jiēdào) is a subdistrict under the administration of Wenjiang District, Chengdu, Sichuan, China. Yongning administers 5 residential communities (Chinese: 社区) and 105 administrative neighborhoods (Chinese: 居民).

The subdistrict spans an area of 23.5 square kilometres and has a registered population of approximately 24,000. Located in the northeast of Wenjiang District, the subdistrict lies approximately 10 kilometers away from the city centre of Chengdu.
