= Wenjiang, Chengdu =

District of Chengdu, Sichuan, China

Wenjiang 温江区
- District
- District of Wenjiang, City of Chengdu
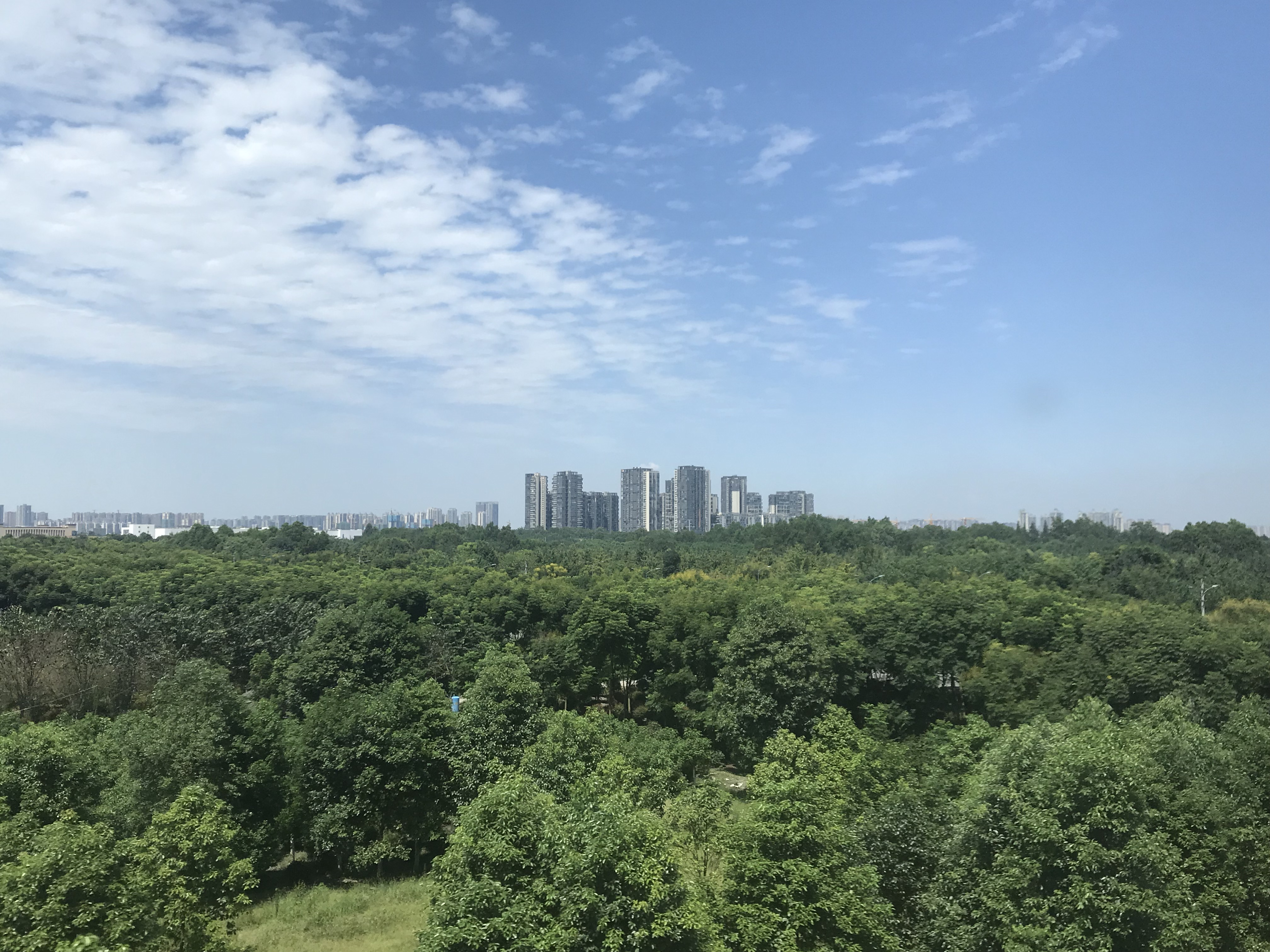
- Wenjiang District in 2019

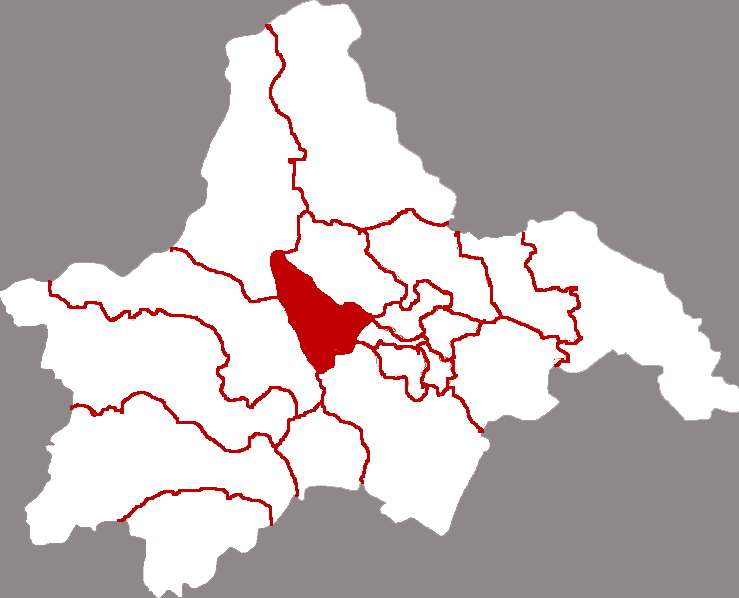
- Location of Wenjiang in Chengdu

- Location in Sichuan
- Coordinates: 30°41′07″N 103°49′57″E
- Country: China
- Province: Sichuan
- Sub-provincial city: Chengdu

Area
  - Total: 277 km^{2} (107 sq mi)

Population (2020 census)
  - Total: 967,868
  - Density: 3,490/km^{2} (9,050/sq mi)
- Time zone: UTC+8 (China Standard)
- Postal code: 6111XX

Wenjiang District (Chinese: 温江区; pinyin: Wēnjiāng Qū; lit. 'warm river district') is a suburban district of the City of Chengdu, Sichuan, China. It covers part of the city's western suburbs.

Wenjiang District is bordered by Qingyang District to the east, Shuangliu District to the southeast, Chongzhou City to the southwest, Dujiangyan City to the northwest, and Pidu District to the east.

== Climate ==
Wenjiang has a humid subtropical climate and is largely warm with high relative humidity all year around.

Climate data for Wenjiang, elevation 548 m (1,798 ft), (1991–2020 normals, extremes 1981–present)
| Month | Jan | Feb | Mar | Apr | May | Jun | Jul | Aug | Sep | Oct | Nov | Dec | Year |
|---|---|---|---|---|---|---|---|---|---|---|---|---|---|
| Record high °C (°F) | 19.5 (67.1) | 22.7 (72.9) | 30.9 (87.6) | 33.8 (92.8) | 35.7 (96.3) | 36.0 (96.8) | 38.9 (102.0) | 39.4 (102.9) | 35.5 (95.9) | 30.8 (87.4) | 24.9 (76.8) | 18.5 (65.3) | 39.4 (102.9) |
| Mean daily maximum °C (°F) | 9.3 (48.7) | 12.1 (53.8) | 16.8 (62.2) | 22.5 (72.5) | 26.3 (79.3) | 28.3 (82.9) | 30.0 (86.0) | 29.9 (85.8) | 25.7 (78.3) | 20.7 (69.3) | 16.0 (60.8) | 10.7 (51.3) | 20.7 (69.2) |
| Daily mean °C (°F) | 5.5 (41.9) | 8.0 (46.4) | 12.0 (53.6) | 17.1 (62.8) | 21.1 (70.0) | 23.8 (74.8) | 25.4 (77.7) | 25.0 (77.0) | 21.6 (70.9) | 17.0 (62.6) | 12.2 (54.0) | 6.9 (44.4) | 16.3 (61.3) |
| Mean daily minimum °C (°F) | 2.7 (36.9) | 4.9 (40.8) | 8.4 (47.1) | 12.9 (55.2) | 17.2 (63.0) | 20.5 (68.9) | 22.1 (71.8) | 21.7 (71.1) | 18.9 (66.0) | 14.7 (58.5) | 9.6 (49.3) | 4.2 (39.6) | 13.1 (55.7) |
| Record low °C (°F) | −6.5 (20.3) | −3.5 (25.7) | −2.0 (28.4) | 3.7 (38.7) | 5.9 (42.6) | 14.1 (57.4) | 16.2 (61.2) | 16.2 (61.2) | 11.1 (52.0) | 2.5 (36.5) | −0.1 (31.8) | −4.2 (24.4) | −6.5 (20.3) |
| Average precipitation mm (inches) | 8.1 (0.32) | 11.4 (0.45) | 24.1 (0.95) | 44.9 (1.77) | 78.0 (3.07) | 109.5 (4.31) | 231.8 (9.13) | 217.1 (8.55) | 120.8 (4.76) | 42.6 (1.68) | 14.8 (0.58) | 6.2 (0.24) | 909.3 (35.81) |
| Average precipitation days (≥ 0.1 mm) | 7.1 | 7.9 | 11.4 | 13.2 | 14.2 | 15.1 | 16.1 | 15.3 | 15.8 | 13.9 | 7.8 | 6.2 | 144 |
| Average snowy days | 1.6 | 0.4 | 0 | 0 | 0 | 0 | 0 | 0 | 0 | 0 | 0 | 0.2 | 2.2 |
| Average relative humidity (%) | 81 | 79 | 77 | 76 | 74 | 79 | 84 | 84 | 84 | 84 | 82 | 82 | 81 |
| Mean monthly sunshine hours | 45.4 | 52.3 | 79.3 | 106.3 | 111.4 | 103.6 | 119.9 | 128.1 | 63.3 | 49.6 | 53.0 | 50.5 | 962.7 |
| Percentage possible sunshine | 14 | 16 | 21 | 27 | 26 | 25 | 28 | 32 | 17 | 14 | 17 | 16 | 21 |
Source: China Meteorological Administration all-time extreme temperatureNOAAall-time January highall-time July High

== Government ==
=== Administrative divisions ===
The Wenjiang District is divided into 6 subdistricts and 3 towns.

==== Subdistricts ====
The six subdistricts of Wenjiang are as follows:

- Liucheng Subdistrict (柳城街道)
- Tianfu Subdistrict (天府街道)
- Yongquan Subdistrict (涌泉街道)
- Gongping Subdistrict (公平街道)
- Yongning Subdistrict (永宁街道)
- Jinma Subdistrict (金马街道)

==== Towns ====
The three towns of Wenjiang are as follows:

- Wanchun (万春镇)
- Shou'an (寿安镇)
- Hesheng (和盛镇)

== Economy ==
Wenjiang district reported a GDP of 54.5 billion Yuan for 2018, an 8.8% increase from 2018. The following table shows a breakdown of the district's GDP:

| Sector | 2018 Value (Yuan) | Percent of 2018 GDP | Percent Increase from 2017 |
|---|---|---|---|
| Primary Sector | 1.905 billion | 3.50% | 3.3% |
| Secondary Sector | 27.119 billion | 49.76% | 8.2% |
| Tertiary Sector | 25.476 billion | 46.74% | 9.8% |
| Total | 54.500 billion | 100.00% | 8.8% |
