= Wansheng station =

Metro station in Chengdu, China

Wansheng 万盛
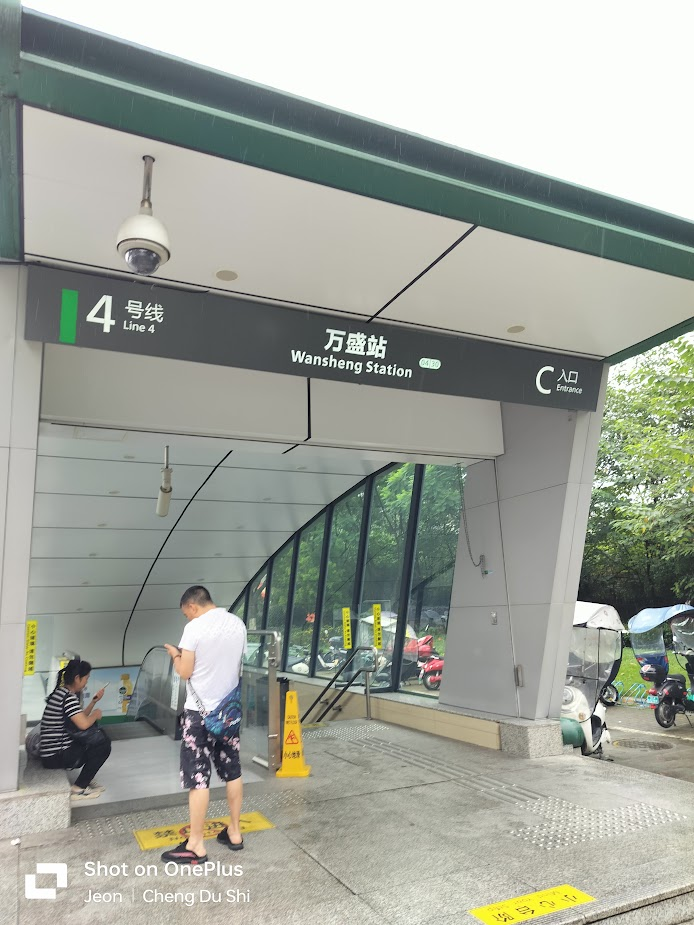
- Entrance C

General information
- Location: Wenjiang District, Chengdu, Sichuan; China
- Operator: Chengdu Metro Limited
- Line: Line 4
- Platforms: 2 (2 side platforms)

Other information
- Station code: 0430

History
- Opened: 2 June 2017

Services
Preceding station	Chengdu Metro	Following station
Terminus	Line 4	Yangliuhe towards Xihe
Location

Wansheng (Chinese: 万盛) is a station on Line 4 of the Chengdu Metro in China. It is the western terminus of Line 4.

== Station layout ==
G	Entrances and Exits	Exits A-D
B1	Concourse	Faregates, Station Agent
B2	Side platform, doors open on the right
B2	Westbound	← Line 4 termination track
B2	Easthbound	Line 4 towards Xihe (Yangliuhe) →
B2	Side platform, doors open on the right
