= Xihe station =

Metro station in Chengdu, China

Xihe 西河
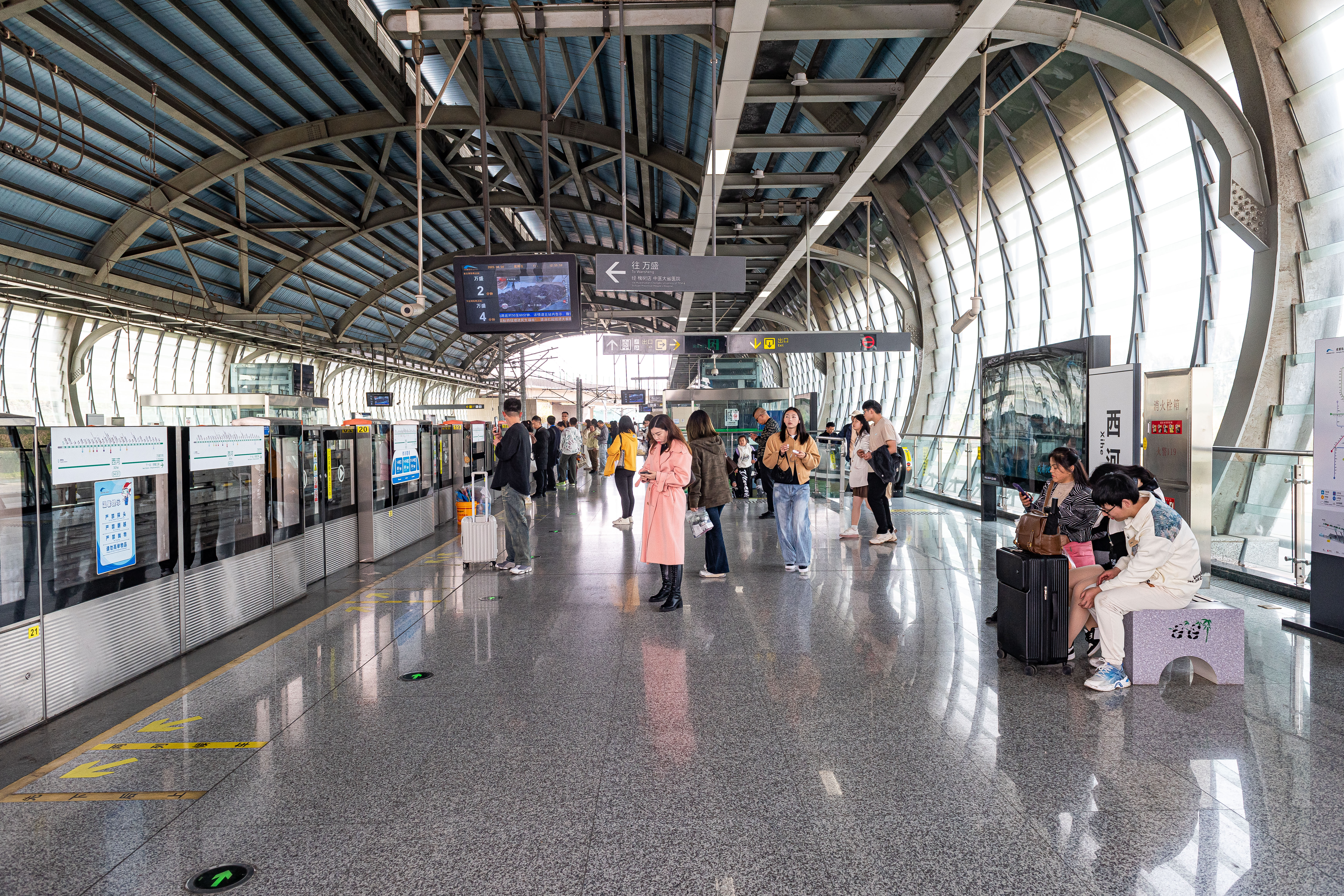

General information
- Location: Longquanyi District, Chengdu, Sichuan; China
- Coordinates: 30.65°N 104.22°E
- Operator: Chengdu Metro Limited
- Line: Line 4
- Platforms: 2 (2 side platforms)

Other information
- Station code: 0401

History
- Opened: 2 June 2017

Services
Preceding station	Chengdu Metro	Following station
Mingshuwangling towards Wansheng	Line 4	Terminus
Location

Xihe (Chinese: 西河) is a station on Line 4 of the Chengdu Metro in China. It is the eastern terminus of Line 4.

== Station layout ==
2F	Side platform, doors open on the right
2F	Westbound	← Line 4 towards Wansheng (Mingshuwangling)
2F	Easthbound	Line 4 termination track →
2F	Side platform, doors open on the right
G	Entrances and Exits	Exits A, B, Faregates, Station Agent

== Gallery ==
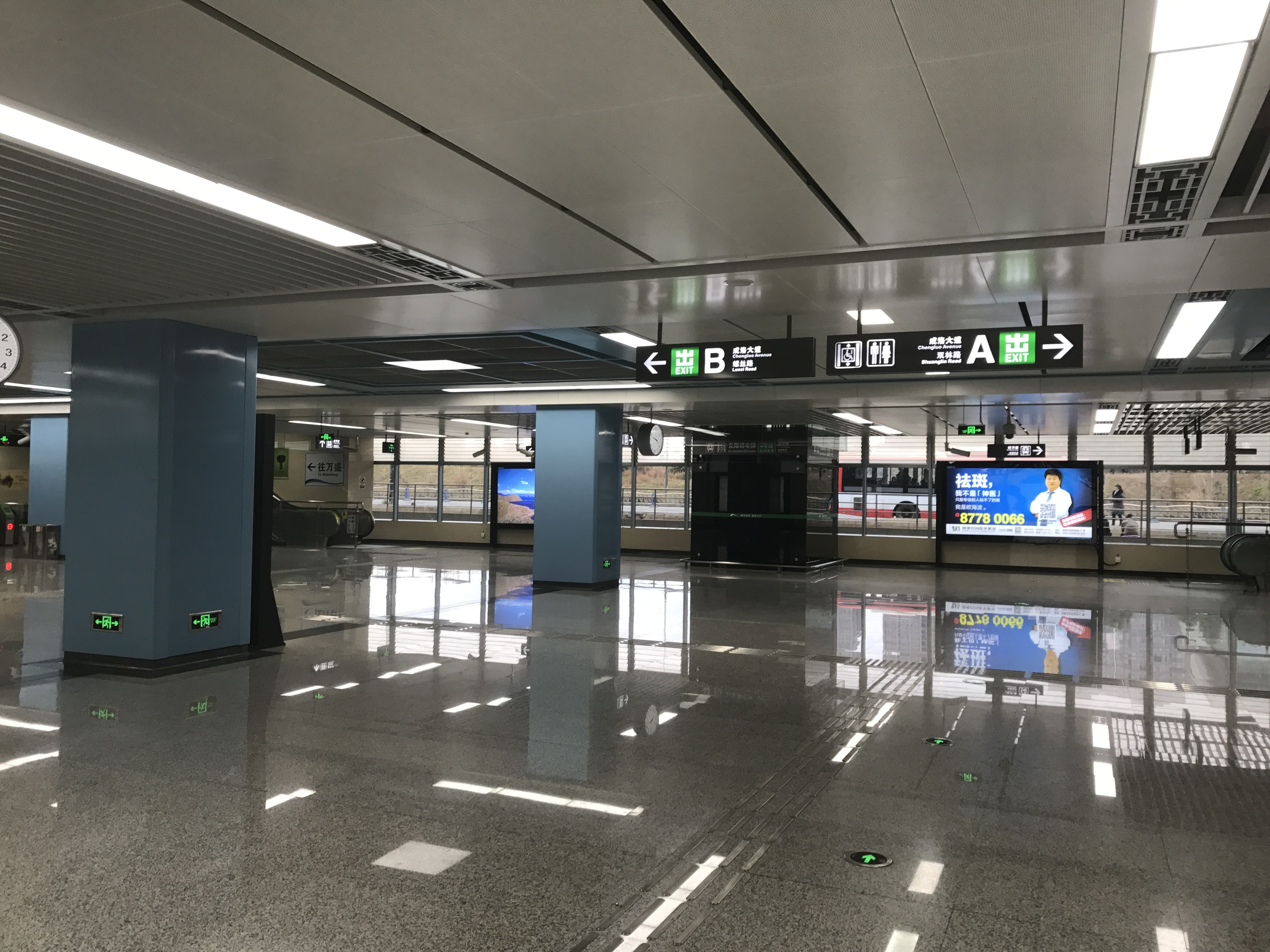
Concourse

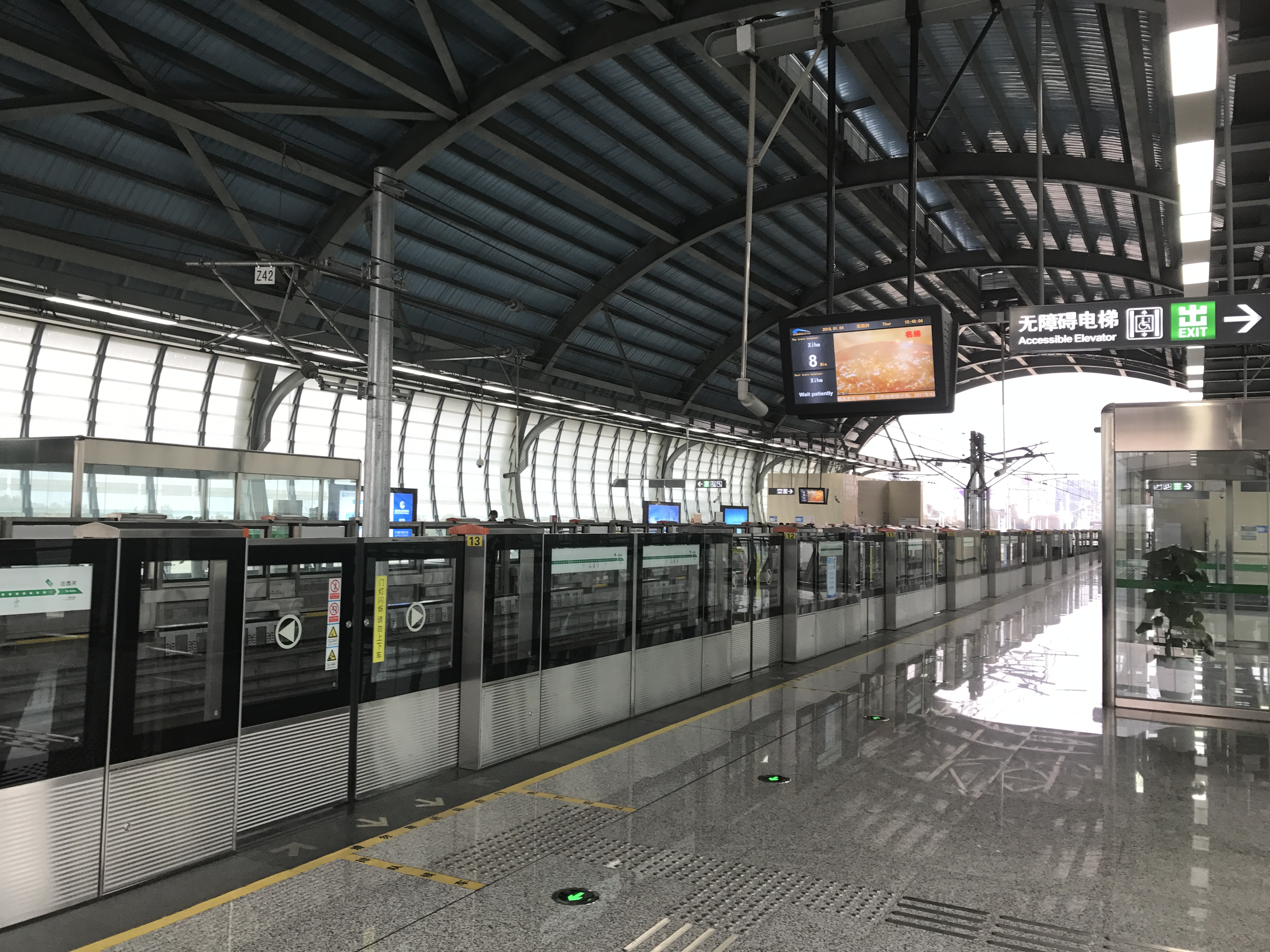
Platform
