= Anjing railway station =

Railway station in Chengdu, China

Anjing 安靖
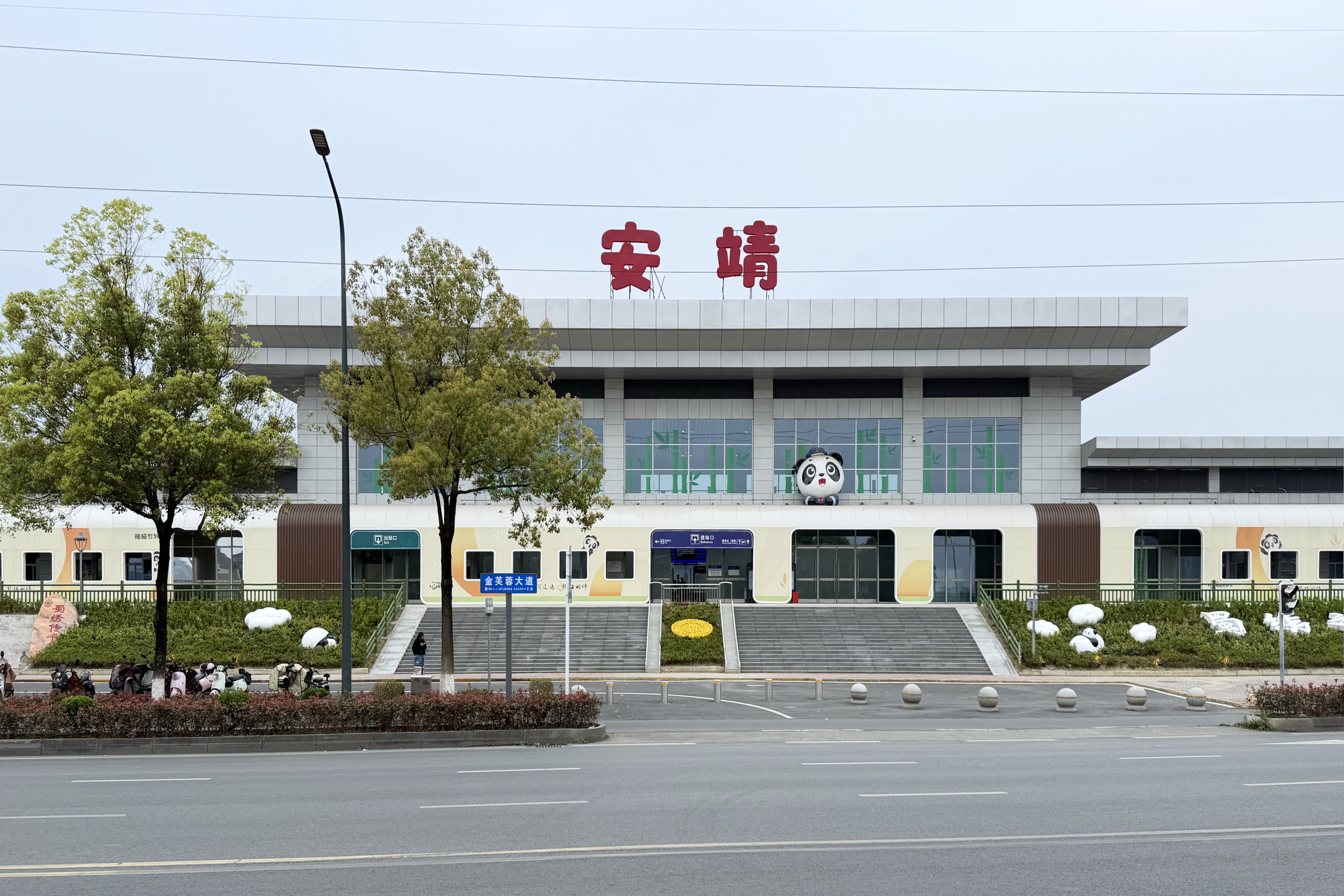

General information
- Location: Pidu District, Chengdu, Sichuan; China
- Coordinates: 30°44′24″N 104°02′03″E
- Operated by: Chengdu Railway Bureau, China Railway Corporation
- Lines: Chengdu–Dujiangyan Intercity Railway, Chengdu West Ring Railway
- Platforms: 3

History
- Previous names: Pixian
Location

Anjing railway station (Chinese: 安靖站; pinyin: Ānjìng Zhàn) is a railway station on the Chengdu–Dujiangyan Intercity Railway and Chengdu West Ring Railway in Pidu District, Chengdu, Sichuan, China. This station has been fully built and some trains currently stop at Anjing. The old name is Pixian Railway Station, the name was changed in 2010.

== See also ==
- Chengdu–Dujiangyan Intercity Railway

Preceding station	China Railway High-speed	Following station
Chengdu Terminus	Chengdu–Dujiangyan intercity railway	Xipu East towards Qingchengshan, Lidui Park or Pengzhou
Preceding station	China Railway	Following station
Chengdu Terminus	Chengdu West ring railway	Chengdu West towards Chengdu South
