= Culture Palace station =

Chengdu Metro station in China

Culture Palace 文化宫
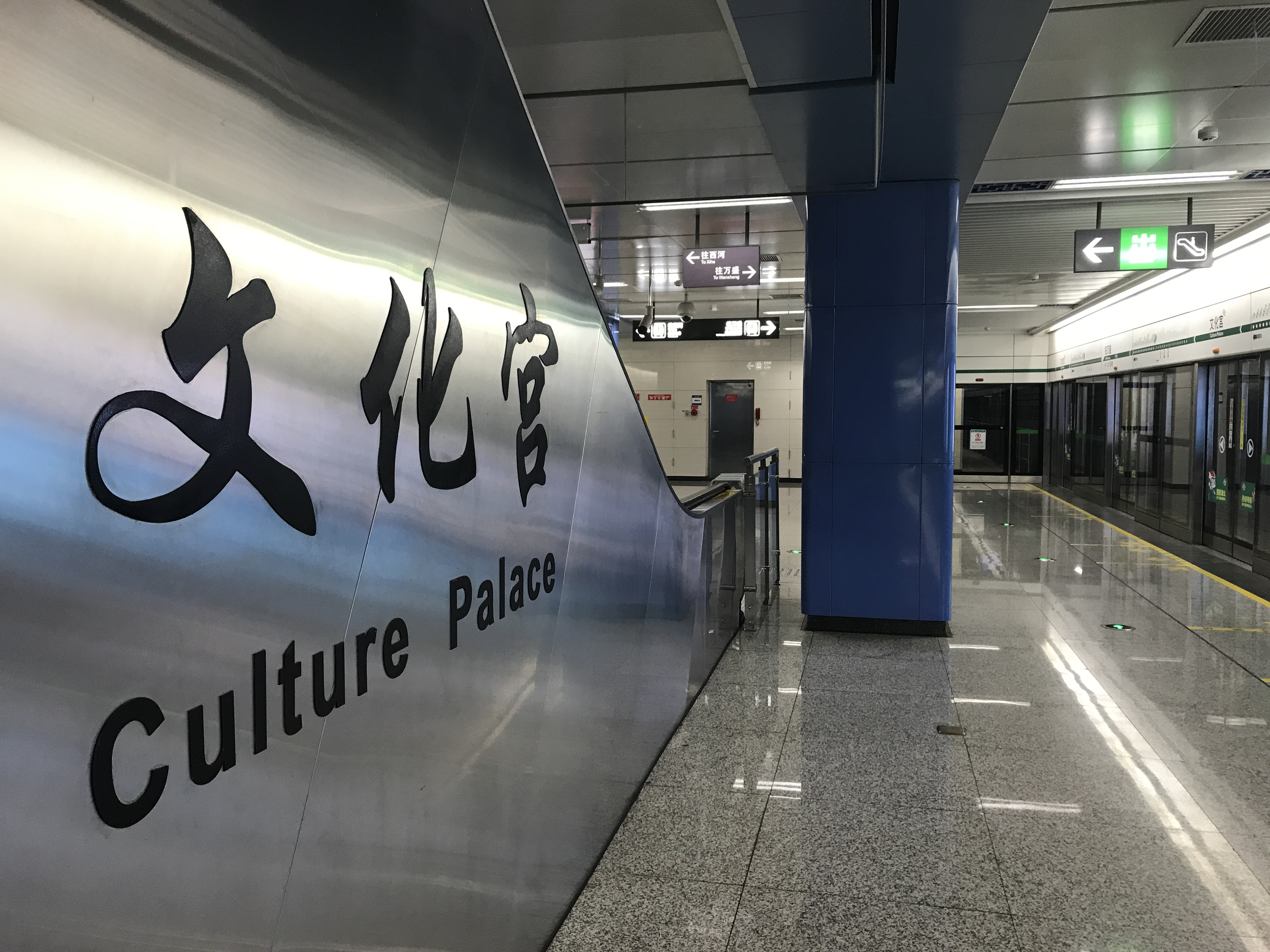

General information
- Location: Qingyang District, Chengdu, Sichuan; China
- Operated by: Chengdu Metro Limited
- Lines: Line 4 Line 7
- Platforms: 4 (2 island platforms)

Other information
- Station code: 0417 0709

History
- Opened: 26 December 2015

Services
Preceding station	Chengdu Metro	Following station
Qingjiang West Road towards Wansheng	Line 4	Southwestern University of Finance and Economics towards Xihe
Jinsha Site Museum Clockwise	Line 7	Dongpo Road Anticlockwise
Location

Culture Palace station (Chinese: 文化宫站; pinyin: Wénhuà Gōng zhàn) is a transfer station on Line 4 and Line 7 of the Chengdu Metro in China. It was opened on 26 December 2015.

== Station layout ==
G	Entrances and Exits	Exits A-E
B1	Concourse	Faregates, Station Agent
B2	Westbound	← Line 4 towards Wansheng (Qingjiang West Road)
B2	Island platform, doors open on the left
B2	Eastbound	Line 4 towards Xihe (Southwestern University of Finance and Economics) →
B3	Clockwise	← Line 7 to Jinsha Site Museum
B3	Island platform, doors open on the left
B3	Counterclockwise	Line 7 to Dongpo Road →

== Gallery ==
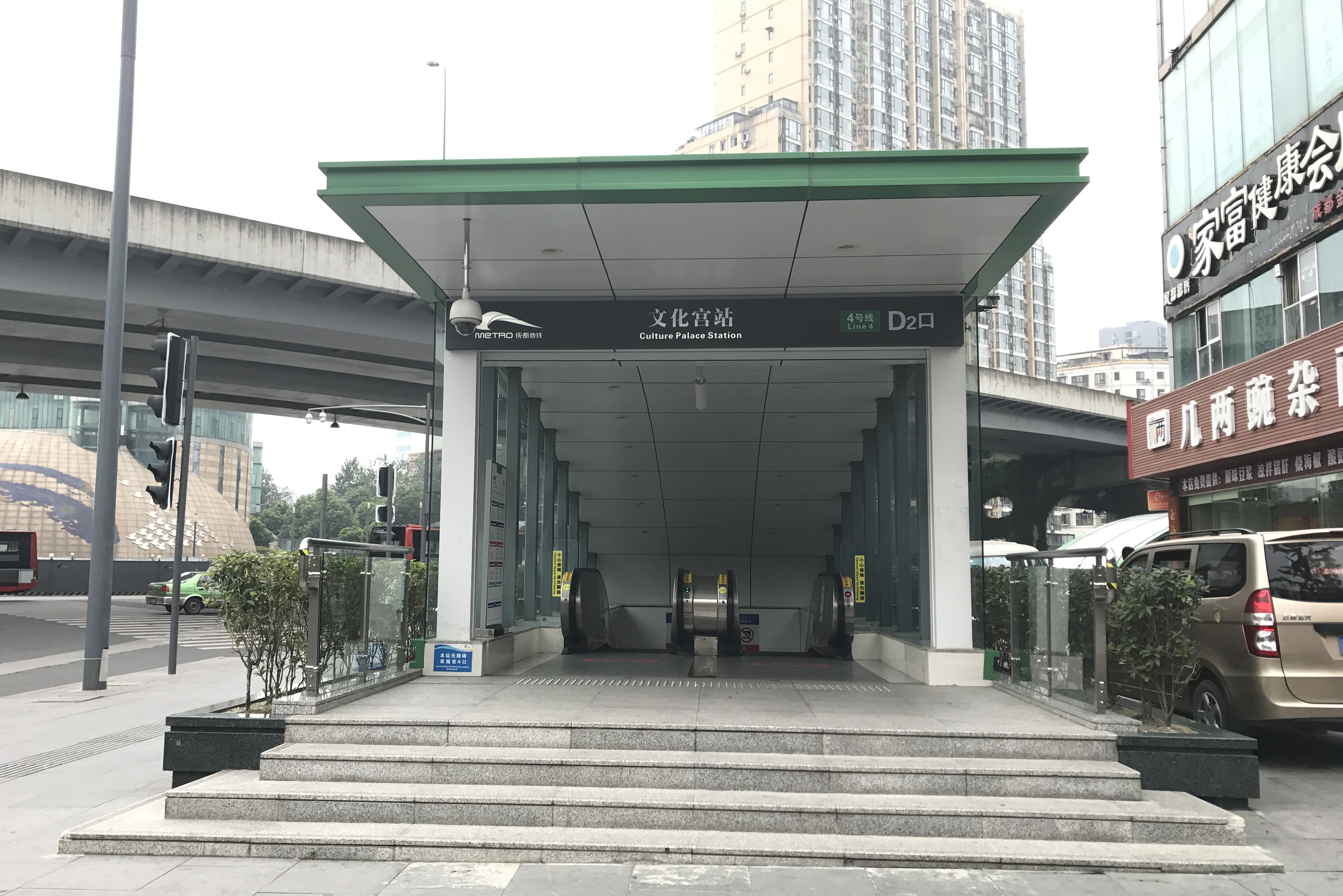
Entrance

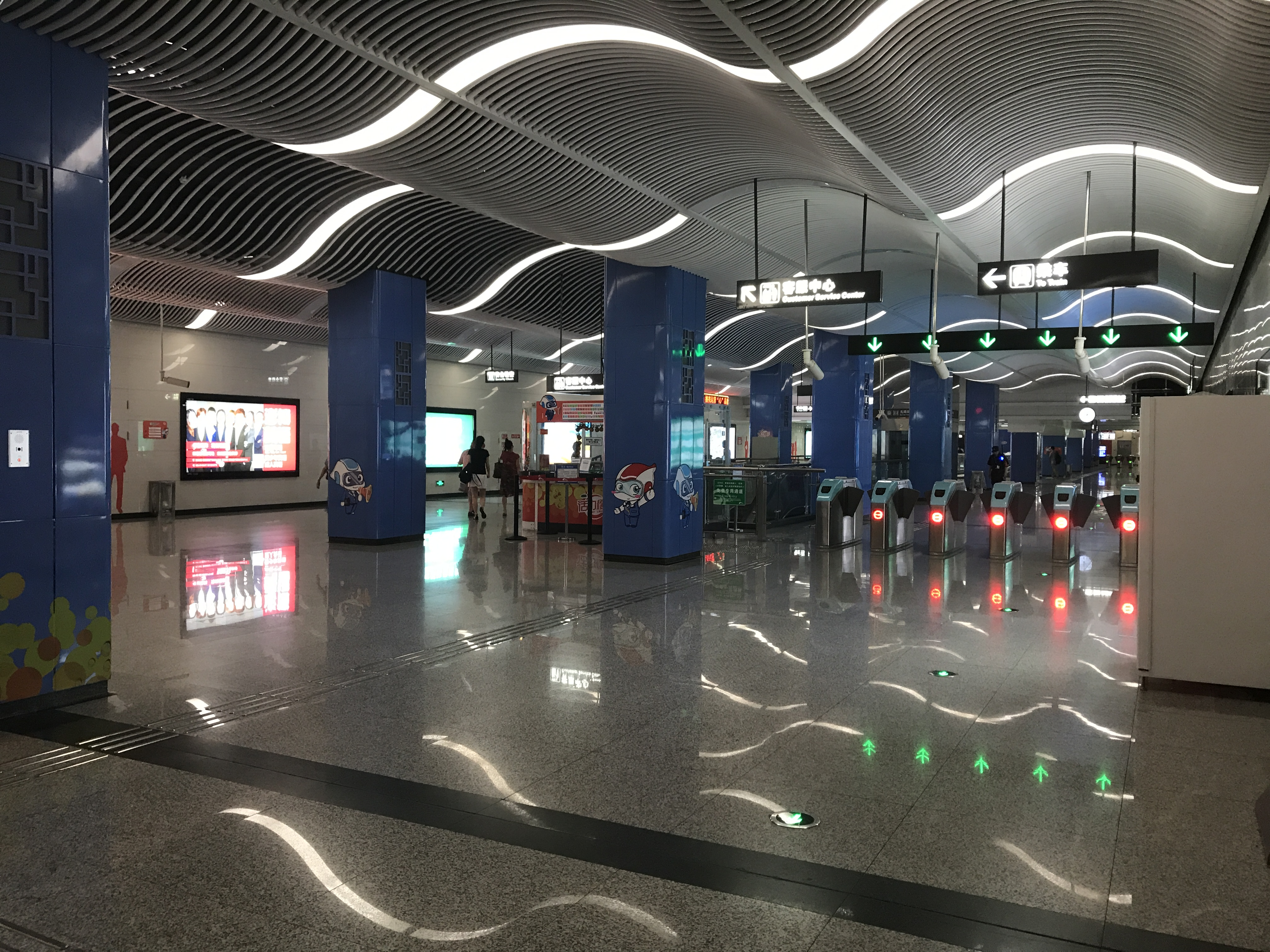
Concourse

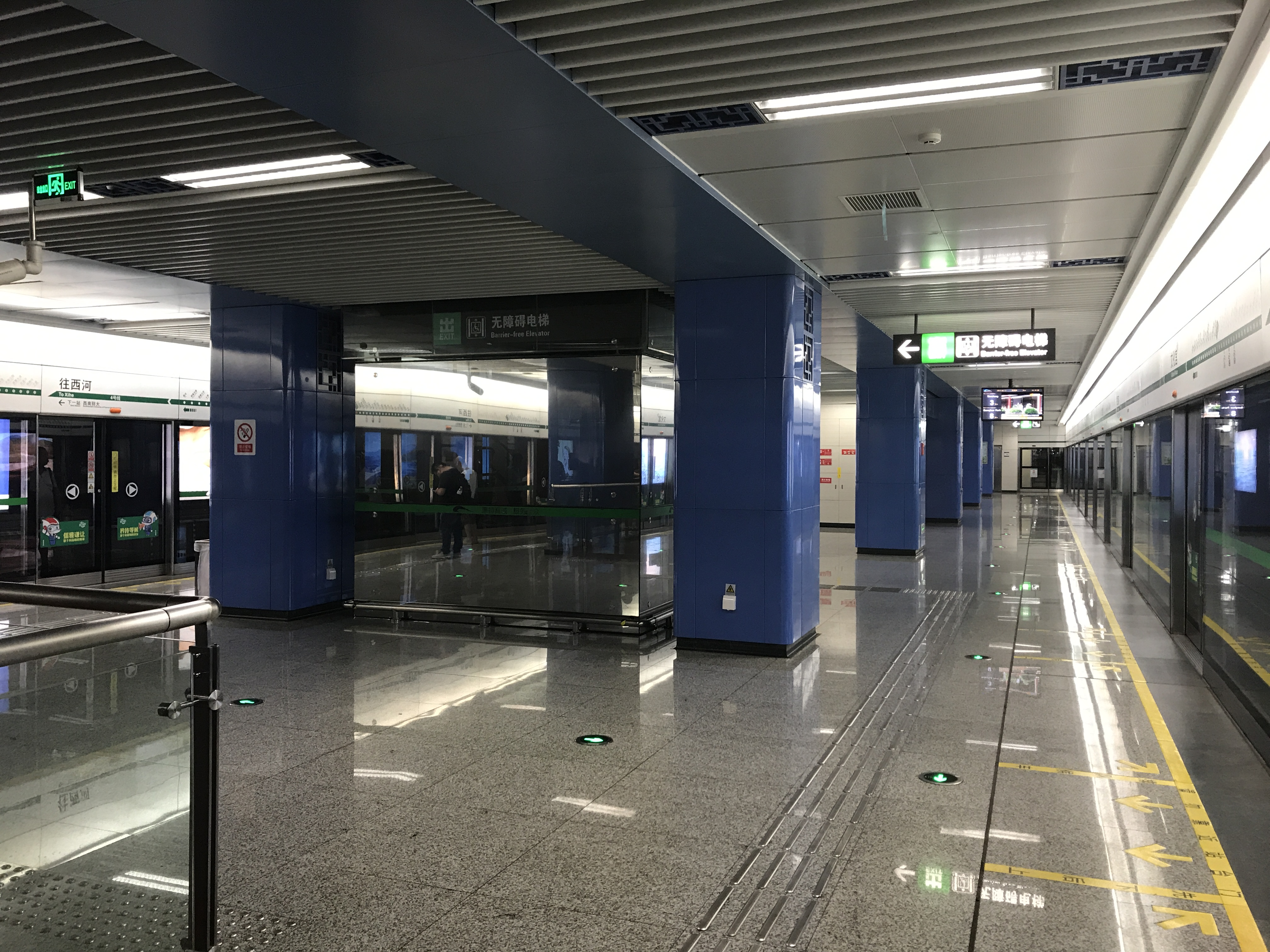
Line 4 platform

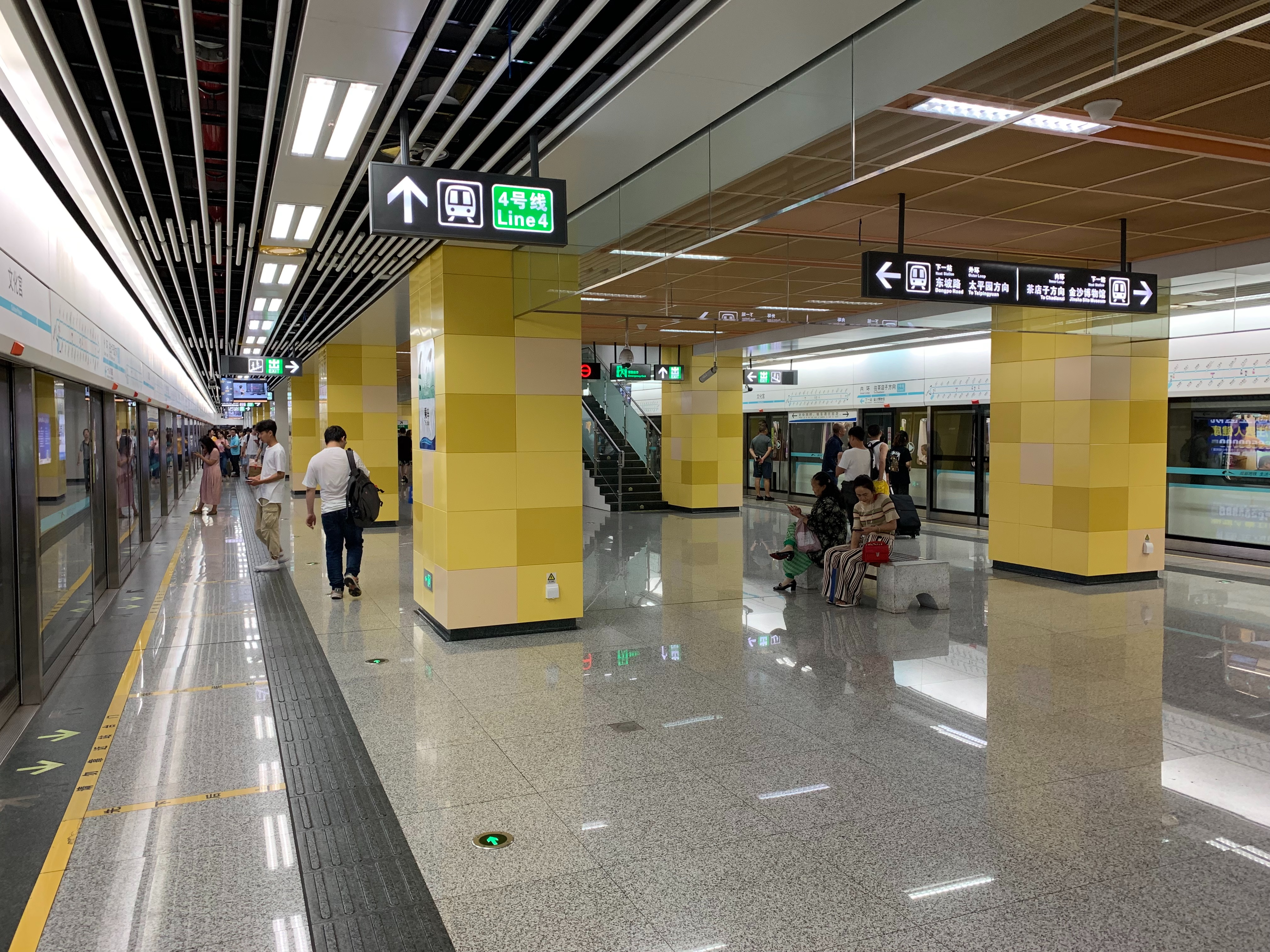
Line 7 platform
