= Dongpo Road station =

Chengdu Metro station

Dongpo Road 东坡路
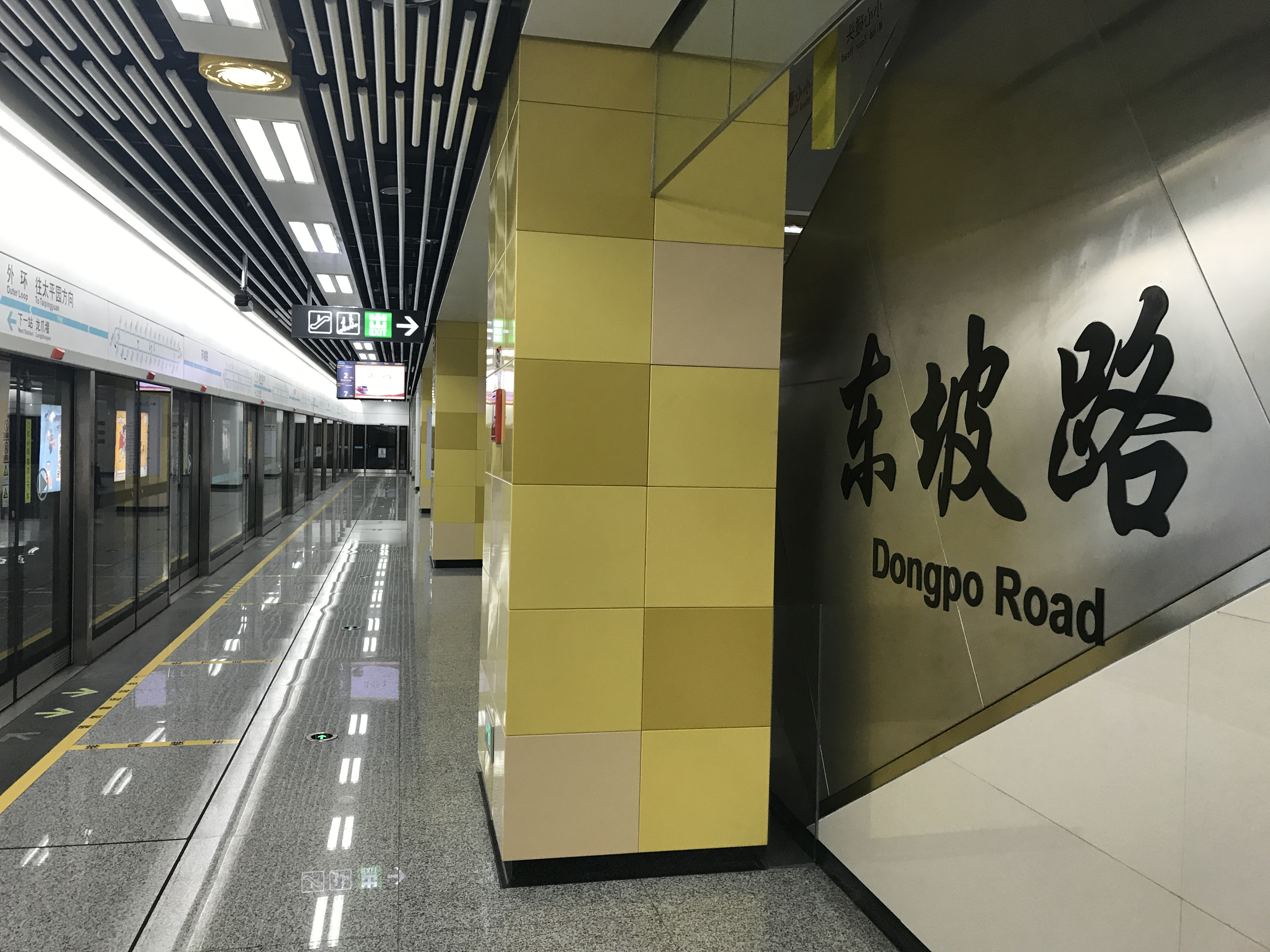

General information
- Location: Qingyang District, Chengdu, Sichuan; China
- Operator: Chengdu Metro Limited
- Lines: Line 7 Line 13
- Platforms: 4 (2 island platforms)

Other information
- Station code: 0710; 1317

History
- Opened: 6 December 2017 (Line 7); 16 December 2025 (Line 13)

Services
Preceding station	Chengdu Metro	Following station
Culture Palace Clockwise	Line 7	Longzhuayan Anticlockwise
Guanghuacun towards Long'an	Line 13	Wanshou Bridge towards Wayaotan
Location

Dongpo Road (Chinese: 东坡路) is a station on Line 7 and Line 13 of the Chengdu Metro in China. It was opened on 6 December 2017.

== Station layout ==
G	Entrances and Exits	Exits A-F, G1, G2
B1	Concourse	Faregates, Station Agent
B2	Clockwise	← Line 7 to Cuijiadian (Culture Palace)
B2	Island platform, doors open on the left
B2	Counterclockwise	Line 7 to Cuijiadian (Longzhuayan) →
B3	Eastbound	← Line 13 to Long'an (Guanghuacun)
B3	Island platform, doors open on the left
B3	Westbound	Line 13 to Wayaotan (Wanshou Bridge) →

== Gallery ==
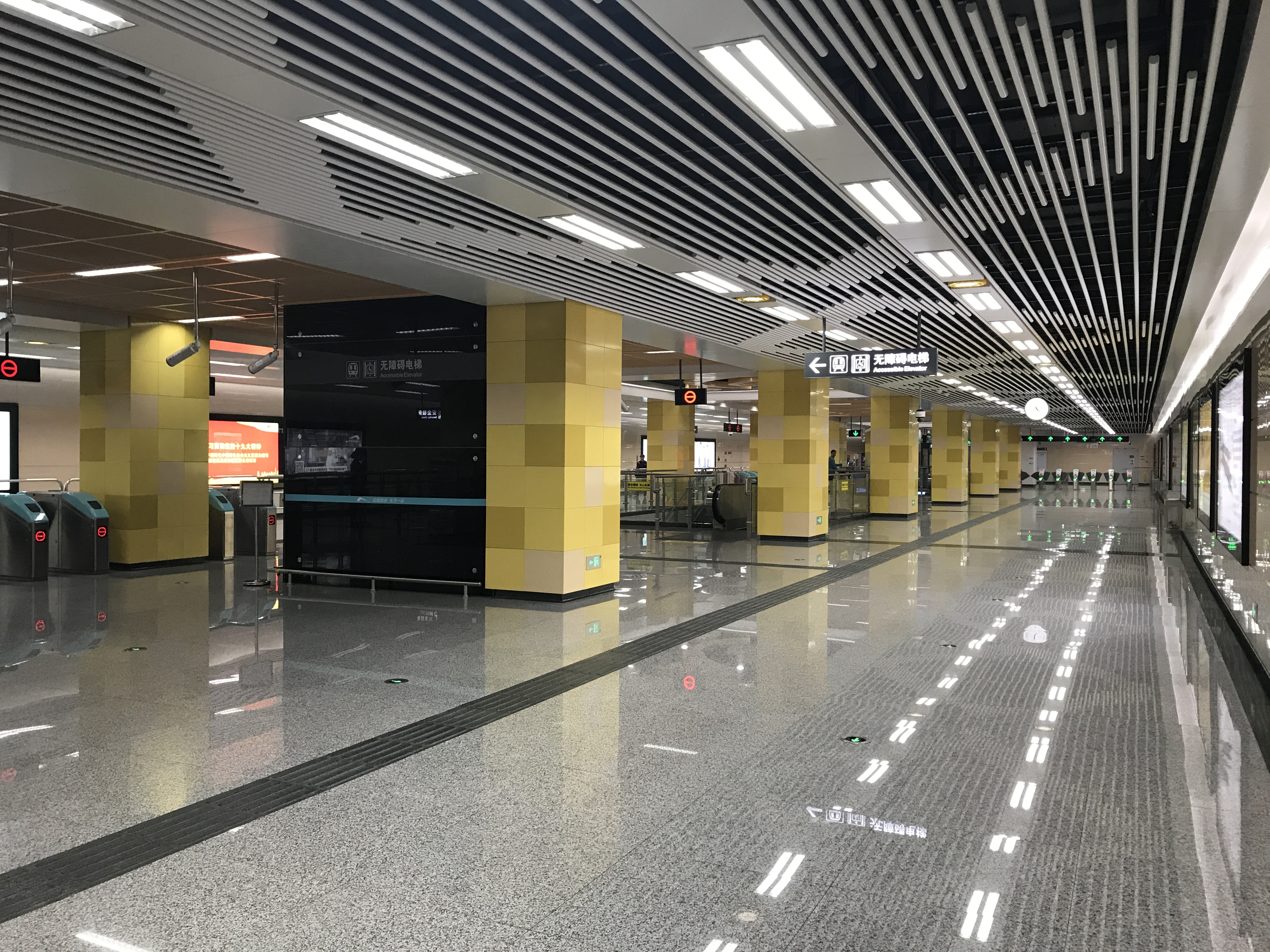
Line 7 Concourse

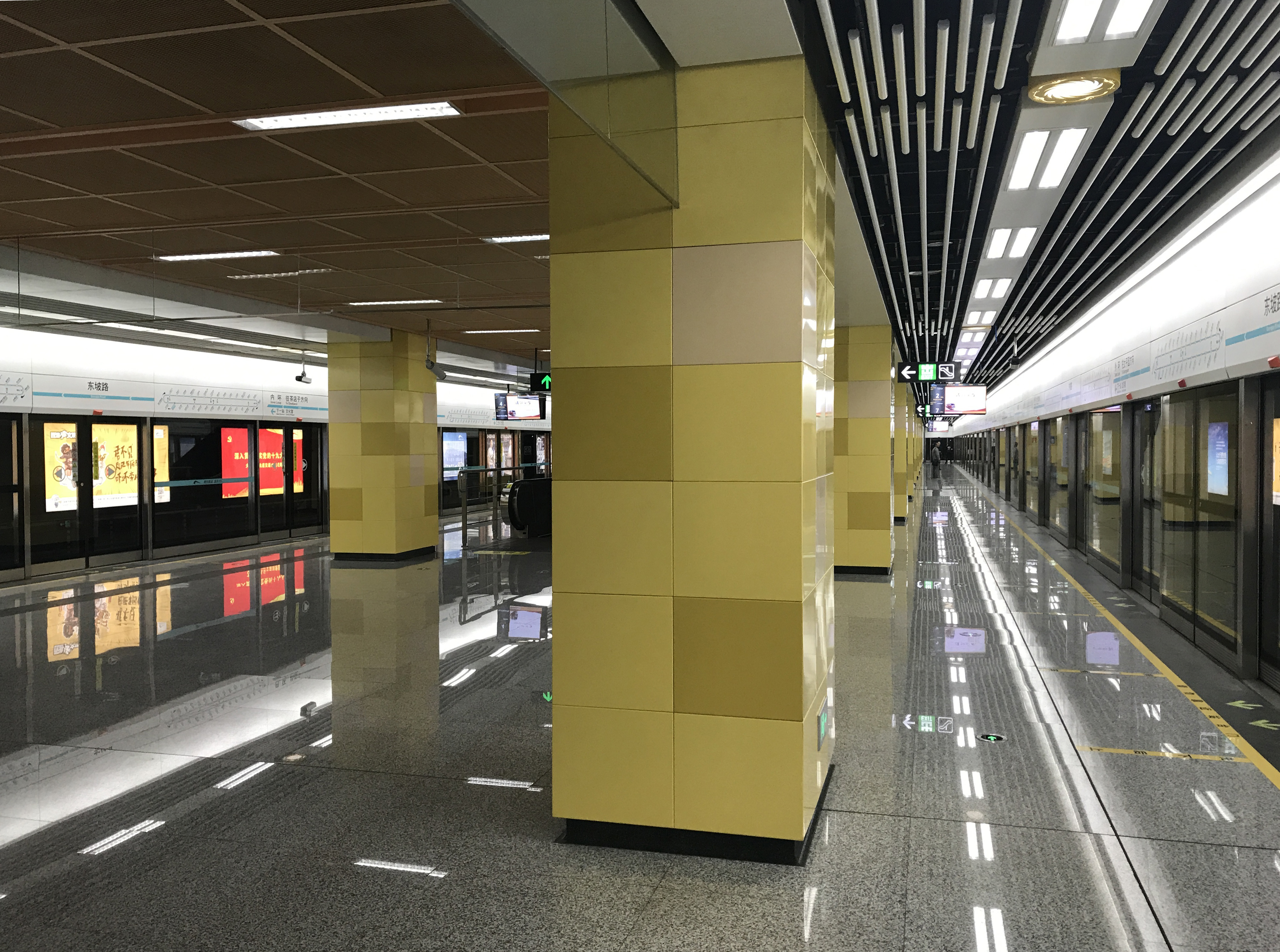
Line 7 Platform

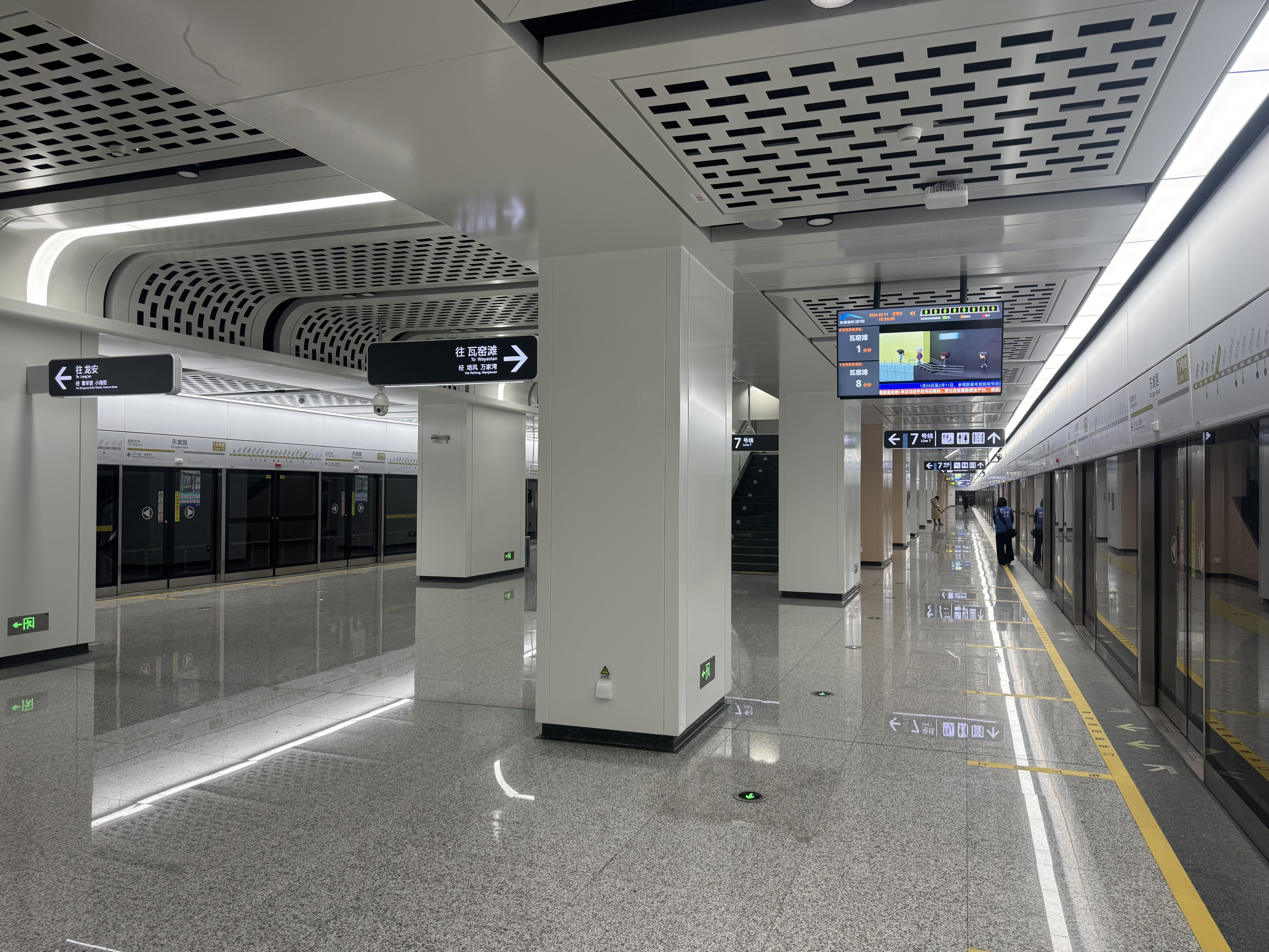
Line 13 Platform
