= Wuhou Avenue station =

Chengdu Metro station

Coordinates: 30.6398°N 104.0103°E

Wuhou Avenue 武侯大道
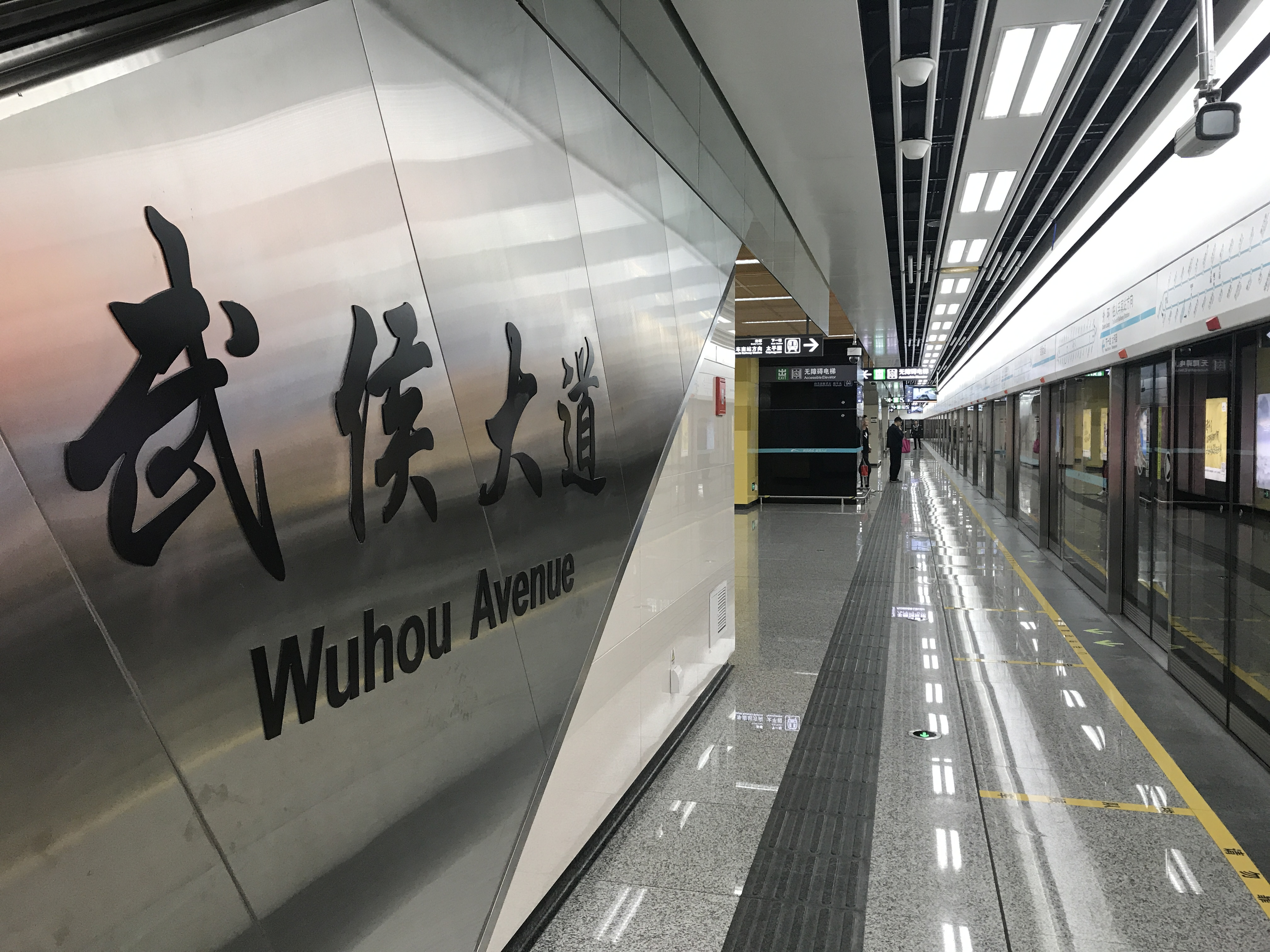

General information
- Location: Wuhou District, Chengdu, Sichuan; China
- Operator: Chengdu Metro Limited
- Line: Line 7
- Platforms: 2 (1 island platform)

Other information
- Station code: 0712

History
- Opened: 6 December 2017

Services
Preceding station	Chengdu Metro	Following station
Longzhuayan Clockwise	Line 7	Taipingyuan Anticlockwise
Location

Wuhou Avenue (Chinese: 武侯大道) is a station on Line 7 of the Chengdu Metro in China. It was opened on 6 December 2017.

== Station layout ==
G	Entrances and Exits	Exits A, B, H, J
B1	Concourse	Faregates, Station Agent
B2	Clockwise	← Line 7 to Cuijiadian (Longzhuayan)
B2	Island platform, doors open on the left
B2	Counterclockwise	Line 7 to Cuijiadian (Taipingyuan) →

== Gallery ==
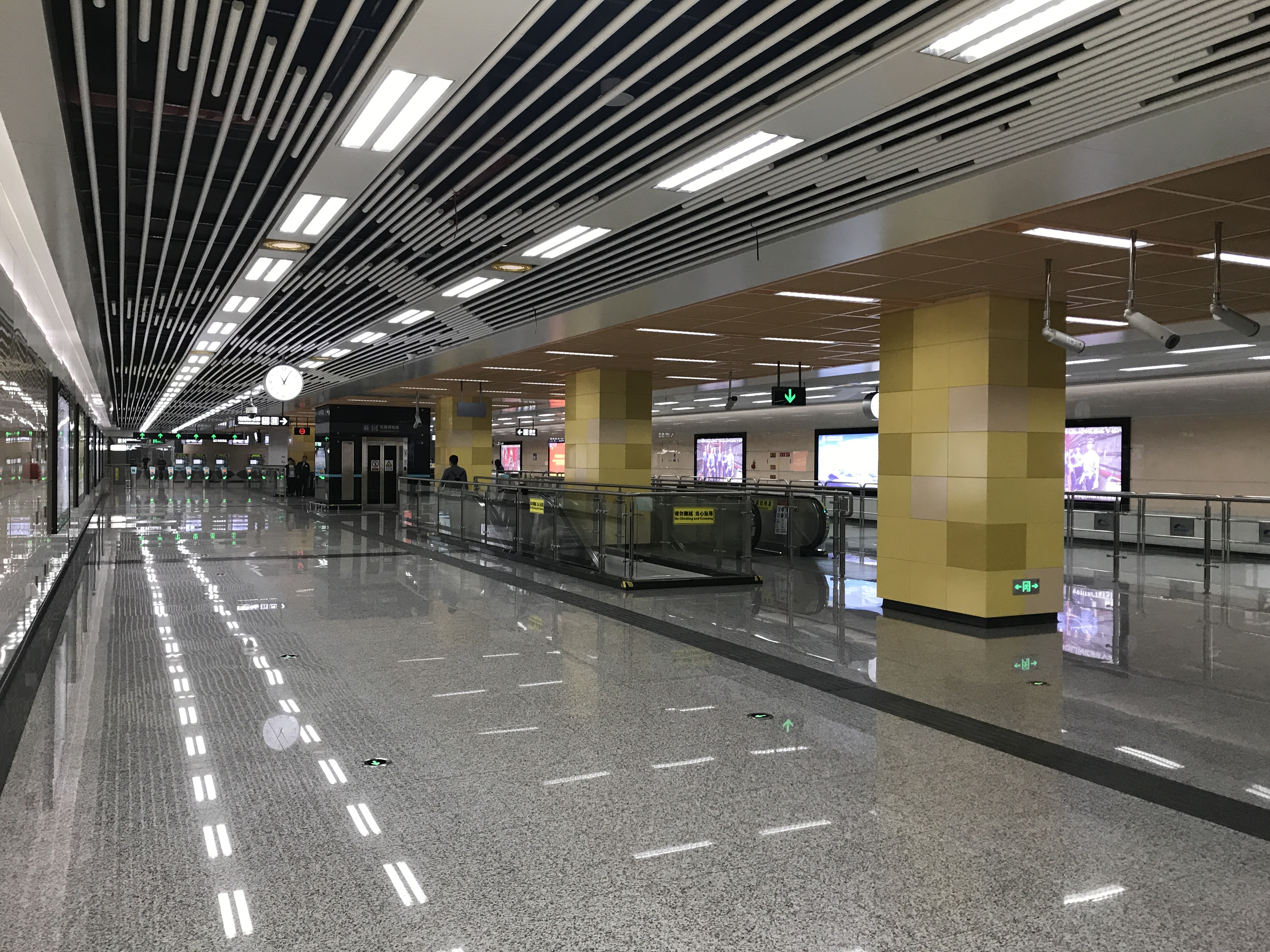
Concourse

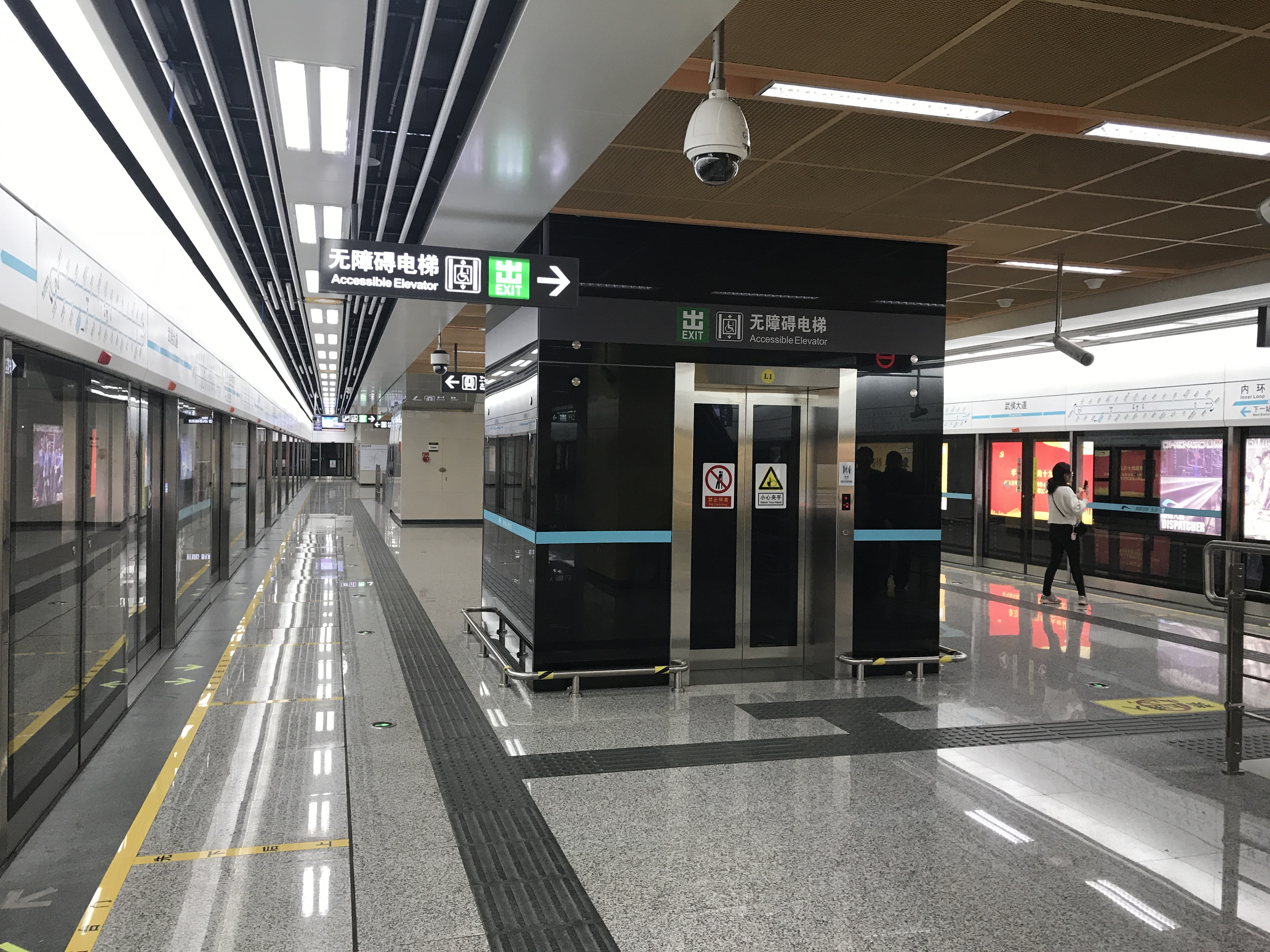
Platform
