= Caotang North Road station =

Metro station in Chengdu, China

Caotang North Road 草堂北路
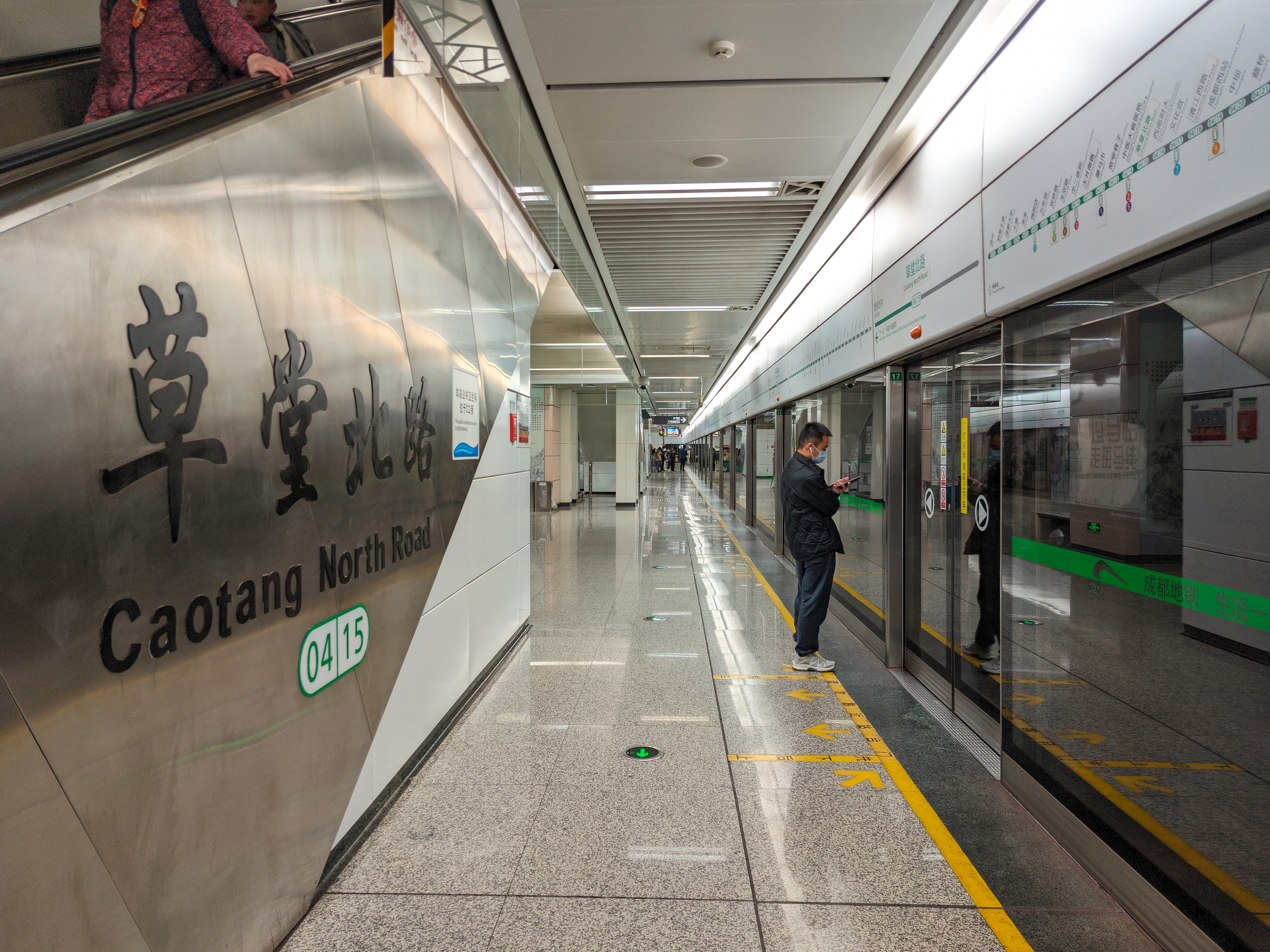
- Platform

General information
- Location: Qingjiang Road East (清江东路) × Caotang Road North (草堂北路); Qingyang District, Chengdu, Sichuan; China
- Coordinates: 30°40′18″N 104°01′34″E
- Operated by: Chengdu Metro Limited
- Line: Line 4
- Platforms: 2 (1 island platform)

Other information
- Station code: 0415

History
- Opened: 26 December 2015
- Previous names: Caotang Road North

Services
Preceding station	Chengdu Metro	Following station
Southwestern University of Finance and Economics towards Wansheng	Line 4	Chengdu University of TCM & Sichuan Provincial People's Hospital towards Xihe
Location

Caotang North Road (Chinese: 草堂北路), formerly known as Caotang Road North, is a station on Line 4 of the Chengdu Metro in China.

== Station layout ==
1F	Ground level	Exits
B1	Concourse	Self-Service Tickets, Customer Service Center
B2		← Line 4 towards Wansheng (Southwestern University of Finance and Economics) →
B2	Island Platform, doors will open on the left
B2		Line 4 towards Xihe (Chengdu University of TCM & Sichuan Provincial People's Hospital)

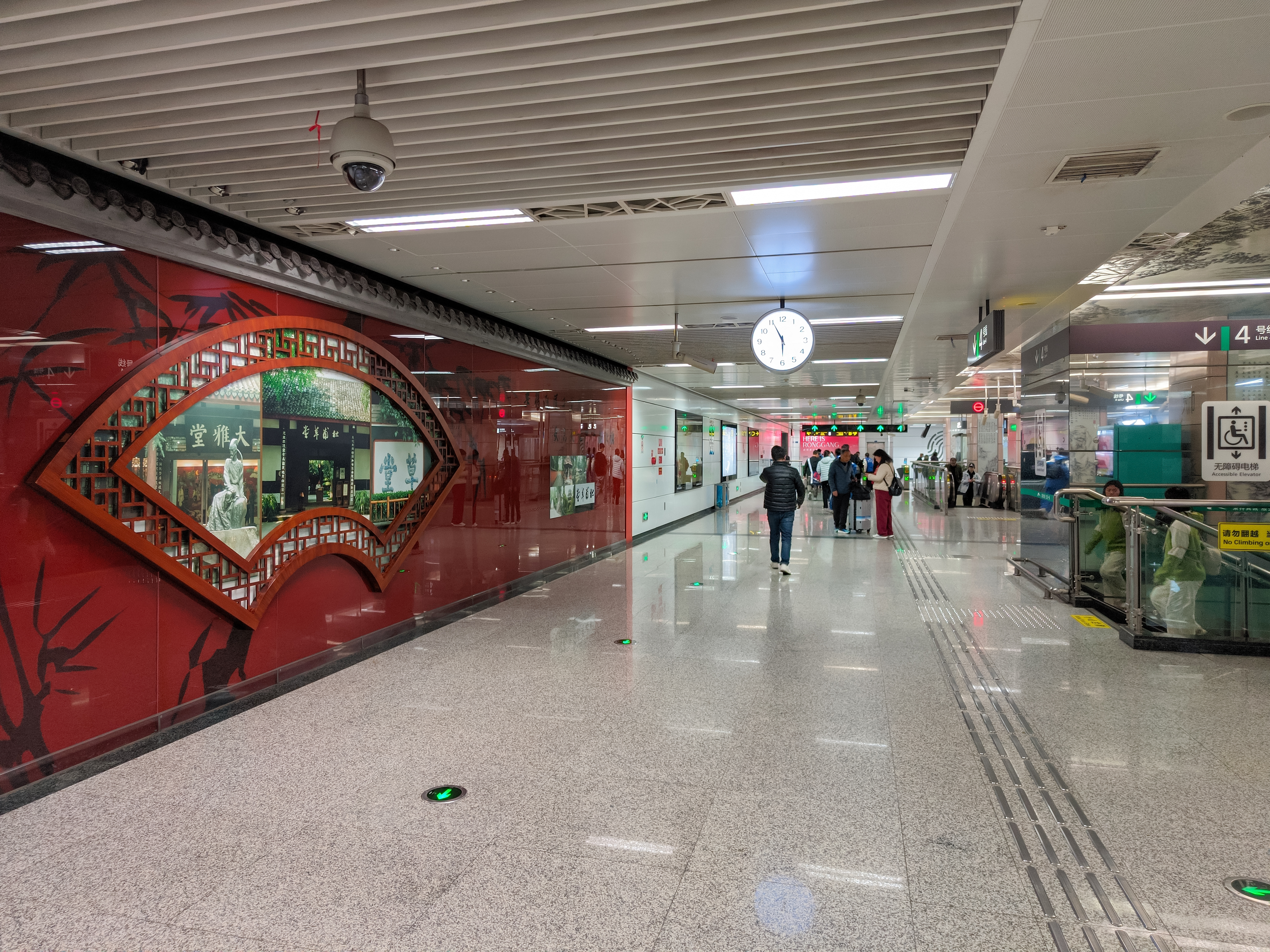
Concourse

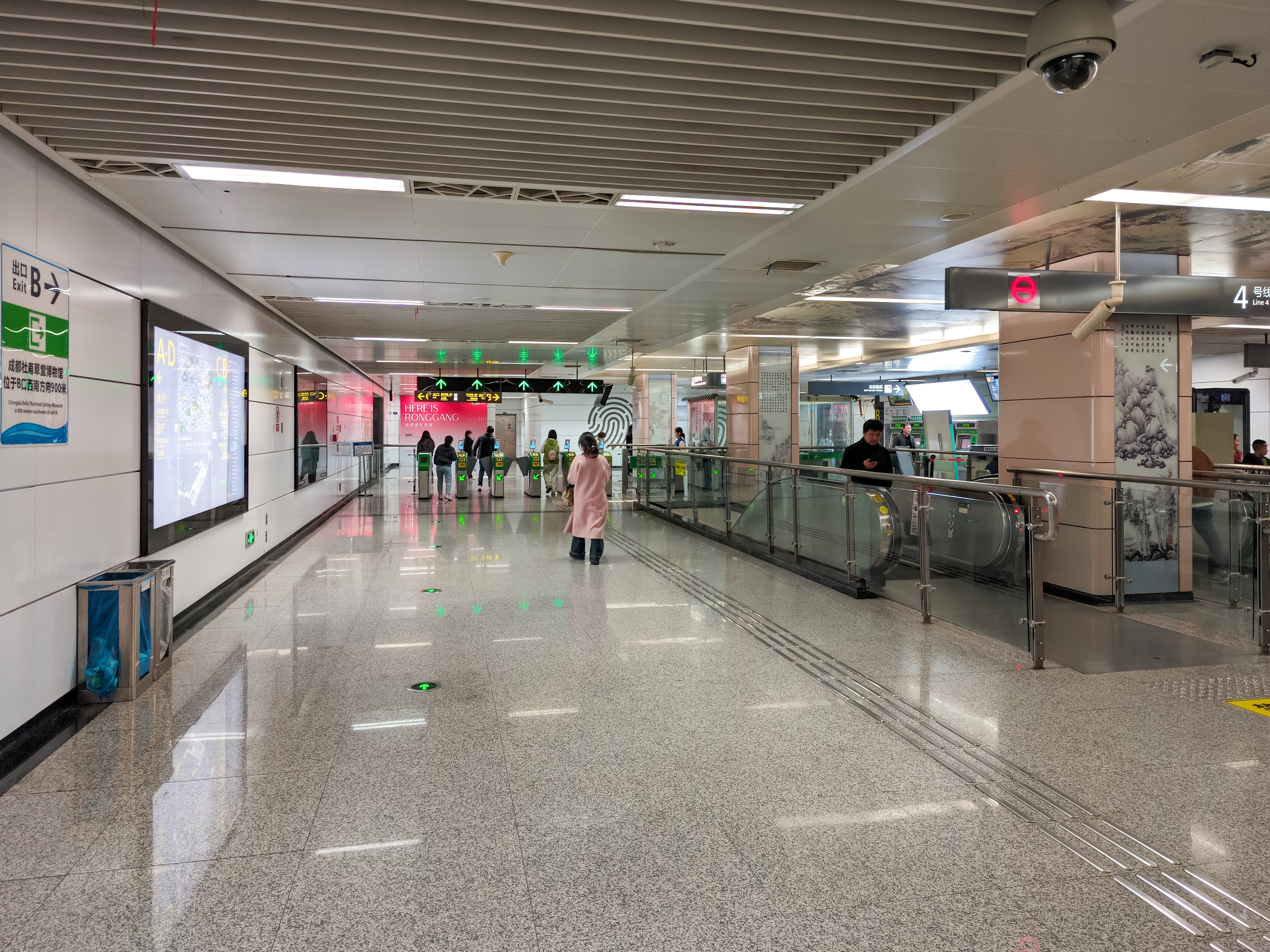
Concourse

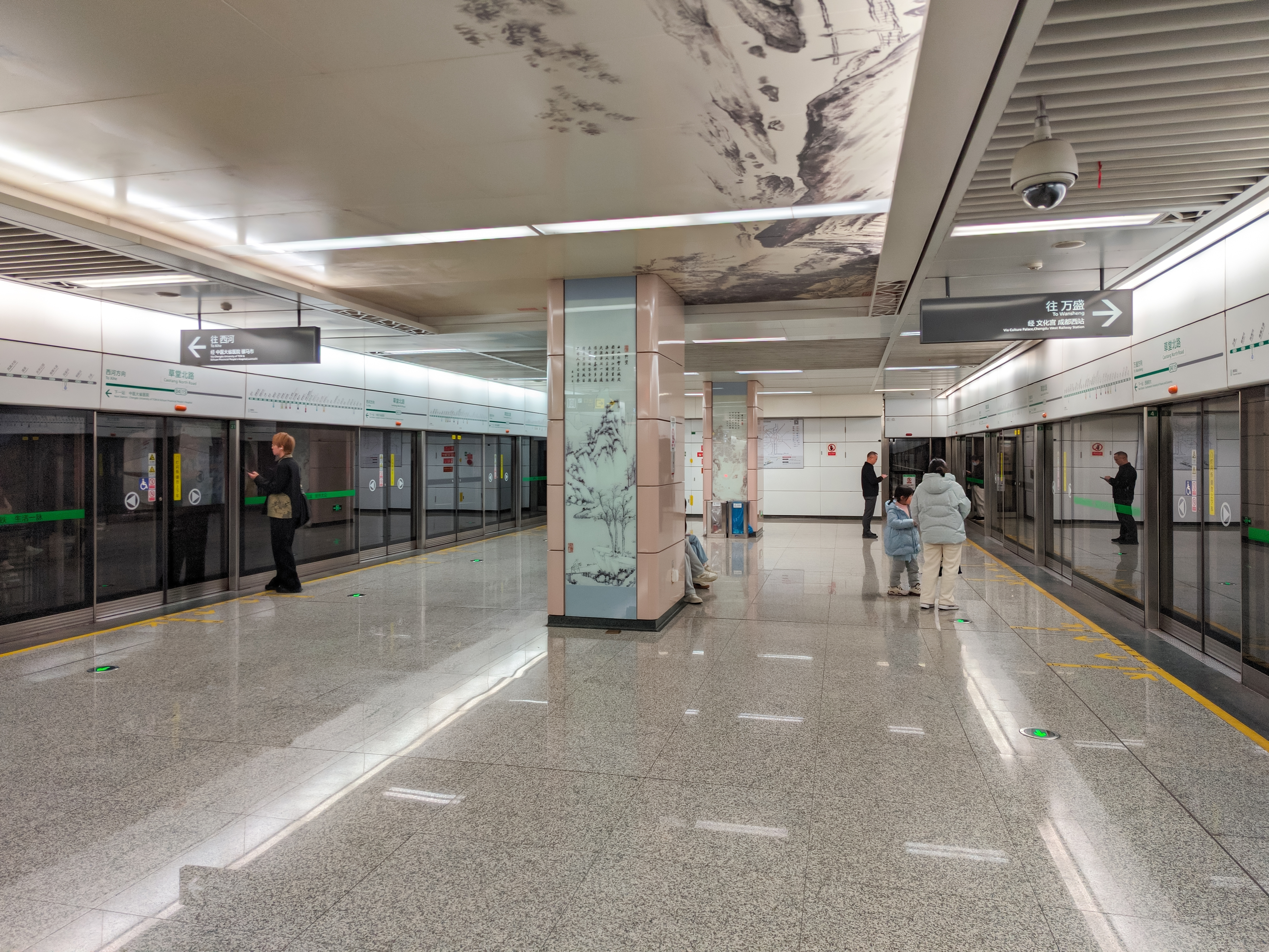
Platforms

== Entrances/exits ==
- A: Qingjiang Road East
- B: Qingjiang Road East. Caotang Road North, Qingjiang Street South (清江南街)
- C: Qingjiang Road East
- D: Qingjiang Road East, Shiren Road South (石人南路)
