= Qingjiang West Road station =

Metro station in Chengdu, China

Qingjiang West Road 清江西路
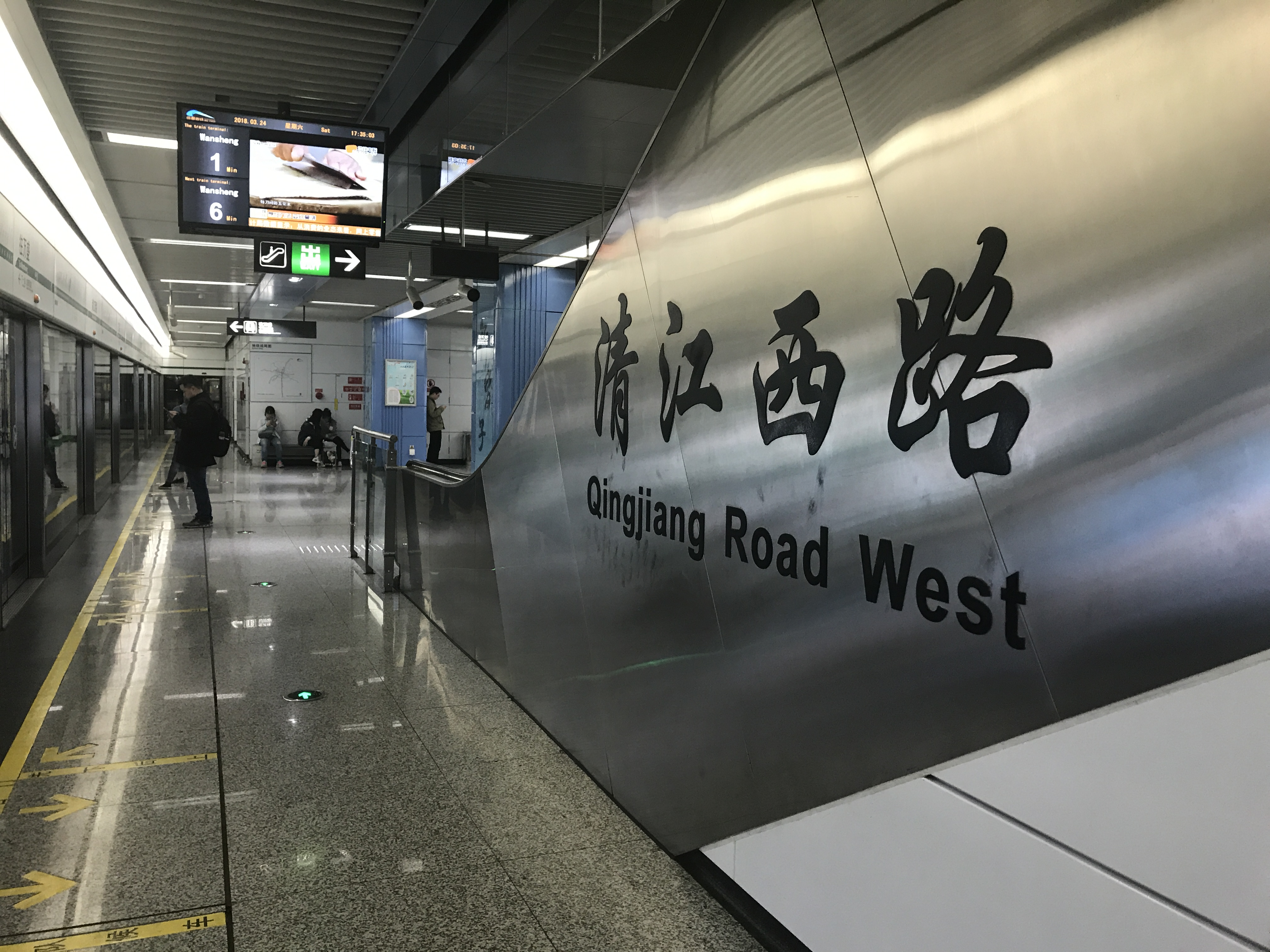

General information
- Location: Qingyang District, Chengdu, Sichuan; China
- Coordinates: 30.6775°N 103.9980°E
- Operated by: Chengdu Metro Limited
- Line(s): Line 4
- Platforms: 2 (1 island platform)

Other information
- Station code: 0418

History
- Opened: 26 December 2015
- Previous names: Qingjiang Road West

Services
| Preceding station | Chengdu Metro | Following station |
|---|---|---|
| Chengdu West Railway Station towards Wansheng | Line 4 | Culture Palace towards Xihe |

Qingjiang West Road (Chinese: 清江西路), formerly known as Qingjiang Road West, is a station on Line 4 of the Chengdu Metro in China.

== Station layout ==
| G | Entrances and Exits | Exits A, B, D, E |
| B1 | Concourse | Faregates, Station Agent |
| B2 | Westbound | ← Line 4 towards Wansheng (Chengdu West Railway Station) |
| B2 | Island platform, doors open on the left |
| B2 | Easthbound | Line 4 towards Xihe (Culture Palace) → |
