= Southwestern University of Finance and Economics station =

Metro station in Chengdu, China

Southwestern University of Finance and Economics 西南财大
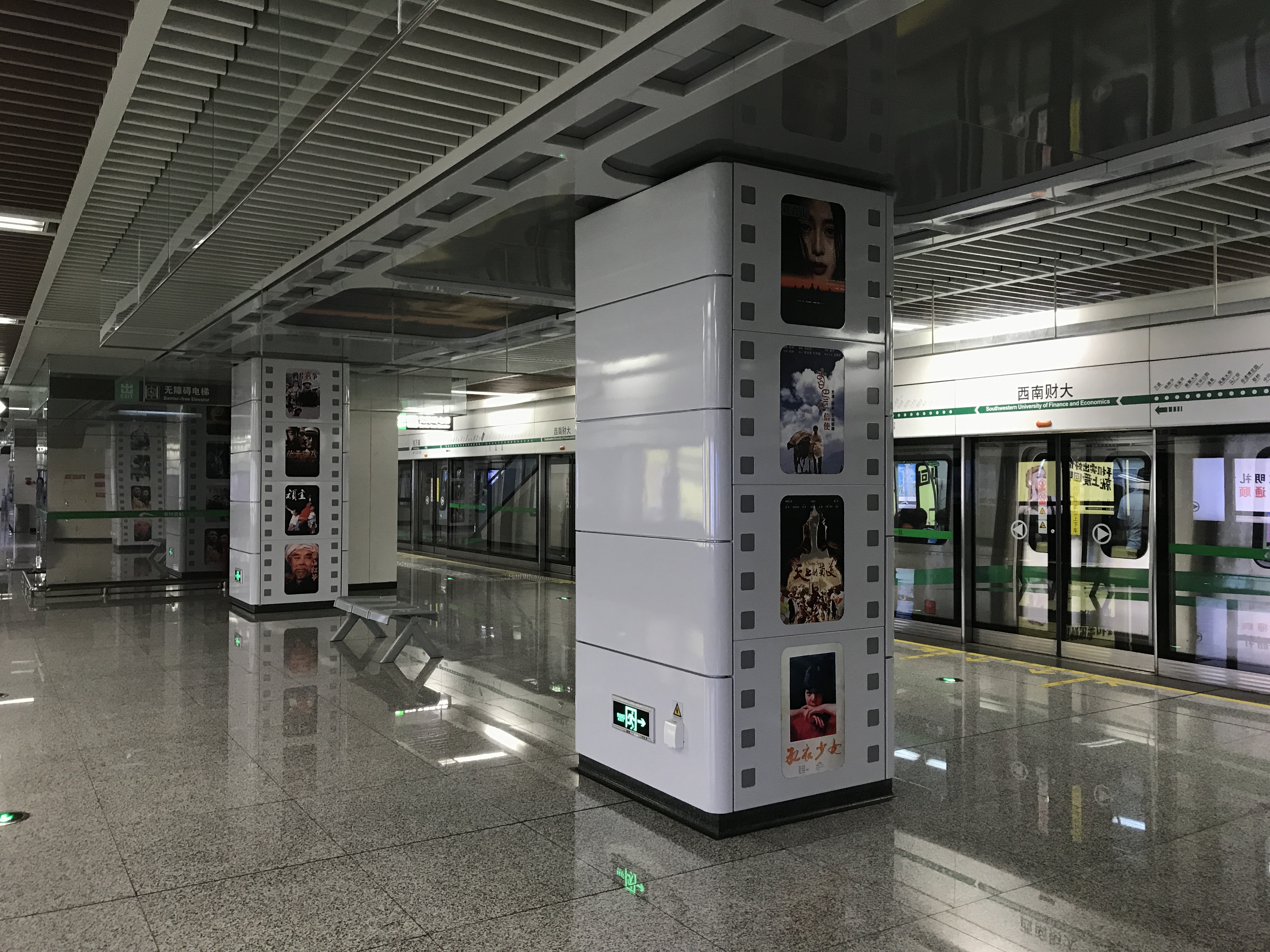

General information
- Location: Qingyang District, Chengdu, Sichuan; China
- Coordinates: 30.6729°N 104.0180°E
- Operated by: Chengdu Metro Limited
- Line: Line 4
- Platforms: 2 (1 island platform)

Other information
- Station code: 0416

History
- Opened: 26 December 2015

Services
| Preceding station | Chengdu Metro | Following station |
|---|---|---|
| Culture Palace towards Wansheng | Line 4 | Caotang North Road towards Xihe |
Location

Southwestern University of Finance and Economics (Chinese: 西南财大) is a station on Line 4 of the Chengdu Metro in China. The station serves the nearby Southwestern University of Finance and Economics.

== Station layout ==
| G | Entrances and Exits | Exits A, B, D |
| B1 | Concourse | Faregates, Station Agent |
| B2 | Westbound | ← Line 4 towards Wansheng (Culture Palace) |
| B2 | Island platform, doors open on the left |
| B2 | Easthbound | Line 4 towards Xihe (Caotang North Road) → |
