= Longzhuayan station =

Chengdu Metro station

Longzhuayan 龙爪堰
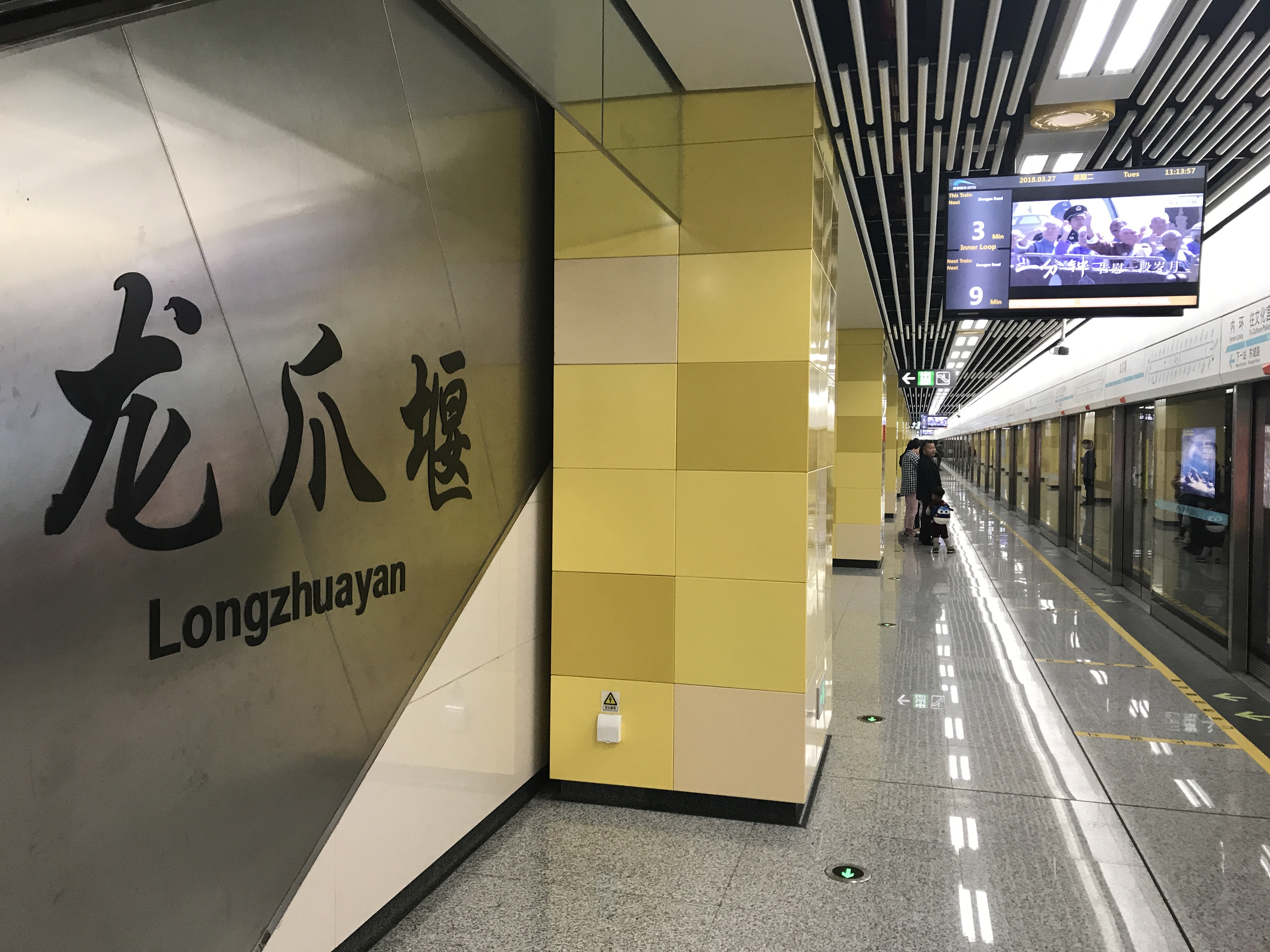

General information
- Location: Wuhou District, Chengdu, Sichuan; China
- Operator: Chengdu Metro Limited
- Lines: Line 7 Line 17
- Platforms: 4 (2 island platforms)

Other information
- Station code: 0711 1717

History
- Opened: 6 December 2017 (Line 7); 17 September 2025 (Line 17)

Services
Preceding station	Chengdu Metro	Following station
Dongpo Road Clockwise	Line 7	Wuhou Avenue Anticlockwise
Yanggongqiao towards Jiujiang North	Line 17	Qingshuihe Bridge towards Gaohong
Location

Longzhuayan (Chinese: 龙爪堰) is a station on Line 7 and Line 17 of the Chengdu Metro in China. It was opened on 6 December 2017 for Line 7, and 17 September 2025 for Line 17.

== Station layout ==
G	Entrances and Exits	Exits A-H
B1	Concourse	Faregates, Station Agent
B2	Westbound	← Line 17 to Jiujiang North (Yanggongqiao)
B2	Island platform, doors open on the left
B2	Eastbound	Line 17 to Gaohong (Qingshuihe Bridge) →
B3	Clockwise	← Line 7 to Cuijiadian (Dongpo Road)
B3	Island platform, doors open on the left
B3	Counterclockwise	Line 7 to Cuijiadian (Wuhou Avenue) →

== Gallery ==
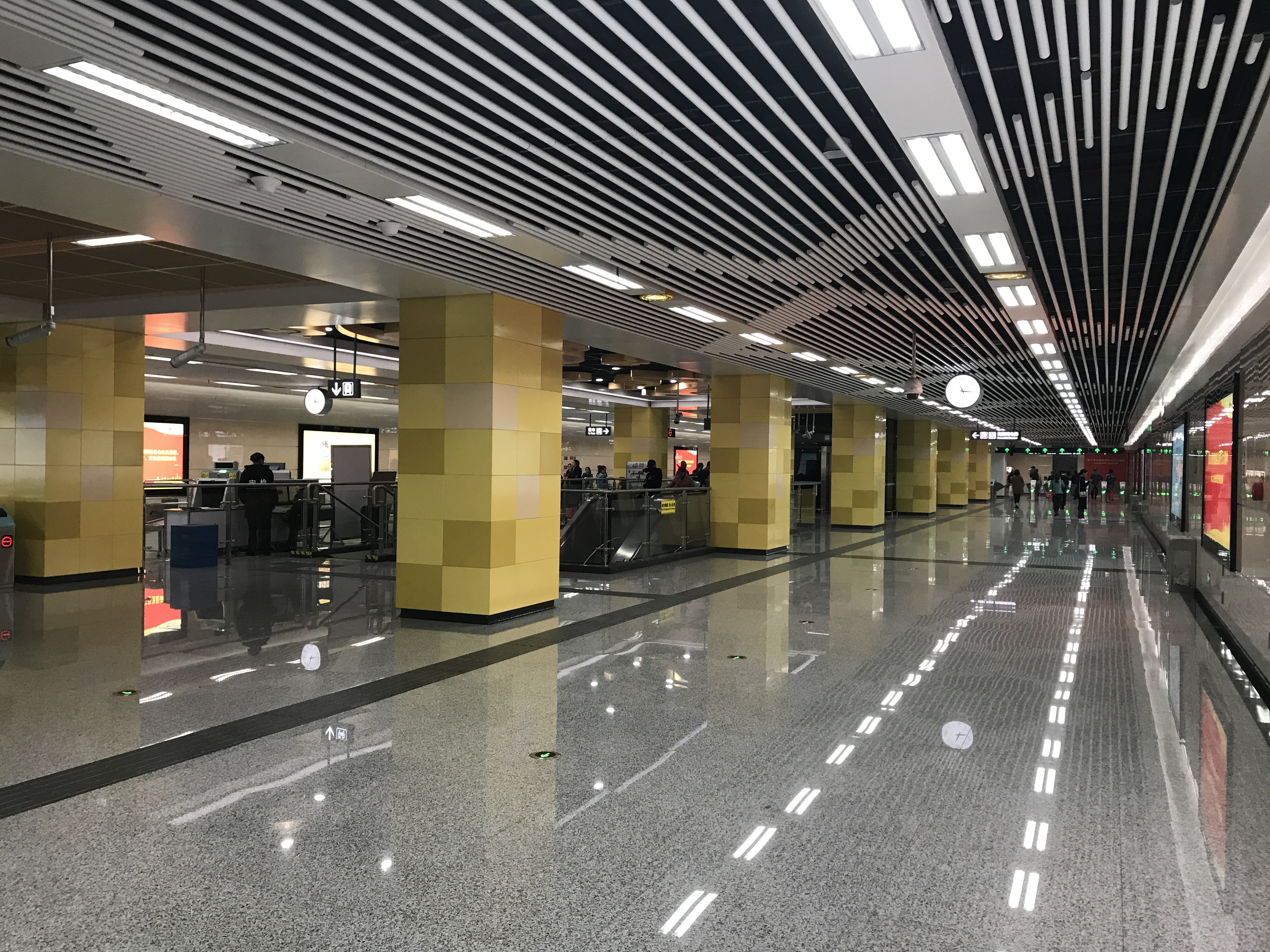
Line 7 Concourse

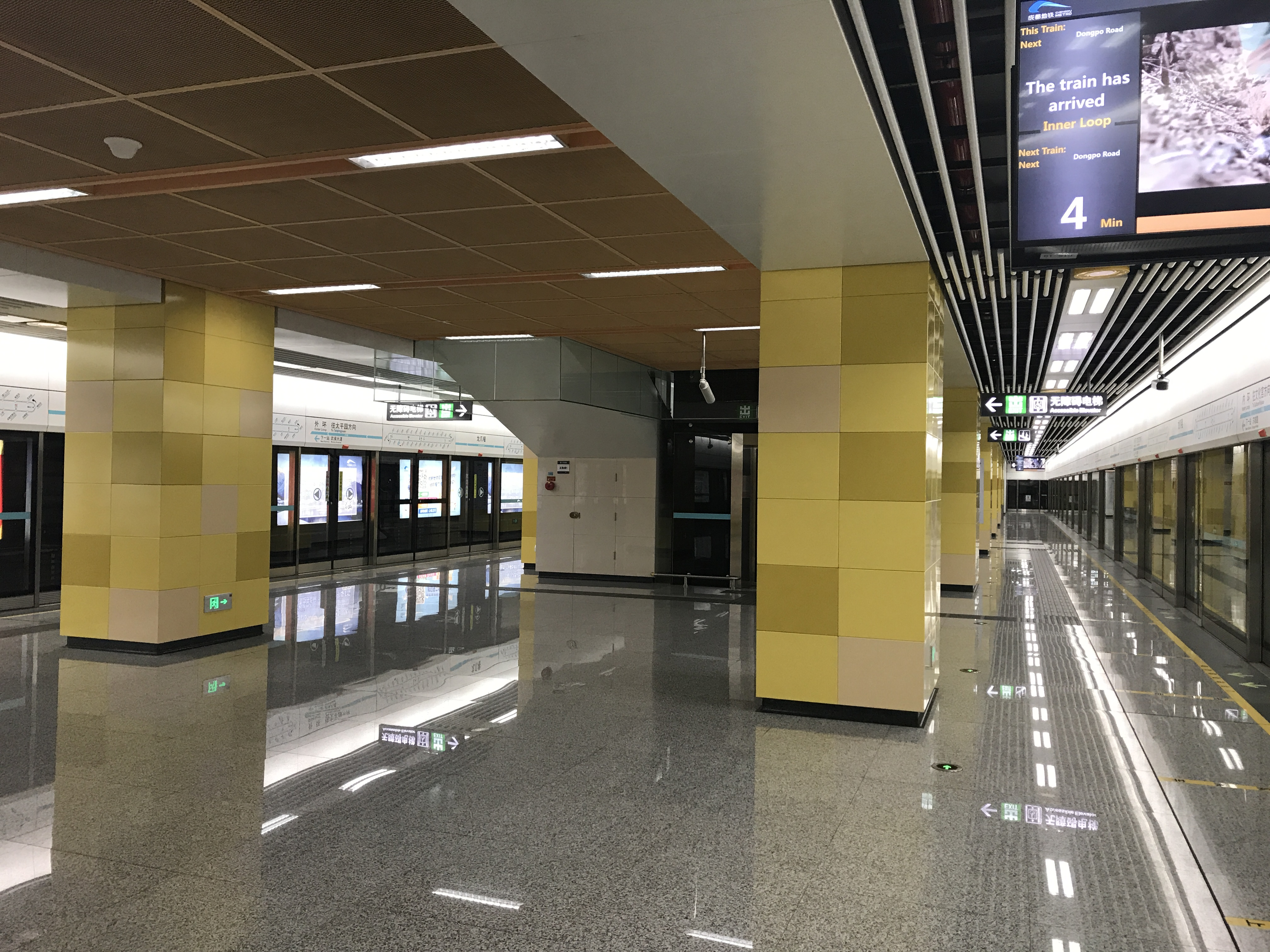
Line 7 Platform
