= Chengdu–Pujiang intercity railway =

Railway line in China

Chengdu–Pujiang intercity railway 成蒲铁路

Overview
- Status: Operating
- Locale: Sichuan
- Termini: Chengdu West; Chaoyanghu
- Stations: 12

Service
- Type: Higher-speed rail
- Operator(s): China Railway High-speed

Technical
- Line length: 99 km (62 mi)
- Track gauge: 1,435 mm (4 ft 8 1/2 in) standard gauge
- Operating speed: 200 km/h (124 mph)

Chengdu–Pujiang intercity railway
- Simplified Chinese: 成蒲铁路
- Traditional Chinese: 成蒲鐵路
Transcriptions
Standard Mandarin
- Hanyu Pinyin: Chéng-Pú Tiělù

Chengdu–Pujiang intercity railway, also known as the Cheng-Pu Express Railway, is a regional railway operated by China Railway High-speed within Sichuan province. It connects the provincial capital of Chengdu with south-western cities along the western edge of the Sichuan Basin to Pujiang. It starts at Chengdu West railway station and terminates and connect with the planned Chengdu–Ya'an railway at Chaoyanghu railway station. It is a National Railways Class I, double tracked electrified line with a design speed of 200 km/h (120 mph) and a total length of 99 km (62 mi). Construction and management of this line was conducted by a joint venture limited liability company between Chengdu Metro and China Railway Chengdu Group.

The railway opened for traffic in Dec 2018.

== Profile ==
Chengdu–Pujiang intercity railway begins in Chengdu at Chengdu West railway station, branching off the Chengdu Ring Railway to travel westwards via Wenjiang, Chongzhou, Dayi County, Qionglai and Pujiang County. Preliminary land acquisition and demolition work was carried out by the end of 2012, allowing for construction to begin. There is a total of 12 railway stations, Chengdu West, Shuangliu North, Wenjiang (elevated), Yangma, Chongzhou (elevated), Longxing, Dayi (elevated), Wangsizhen, Qionglai (elevated), Xilai, Pujiang and Chaoyanghu. The line started to operate on December 28, 2018.

Chaoyanghu will also be served by the planned Chengdu–Ya'an railway.
