= Chengdu West railway station =

Railway station in Chengdu, China

Chengdu West 成都西
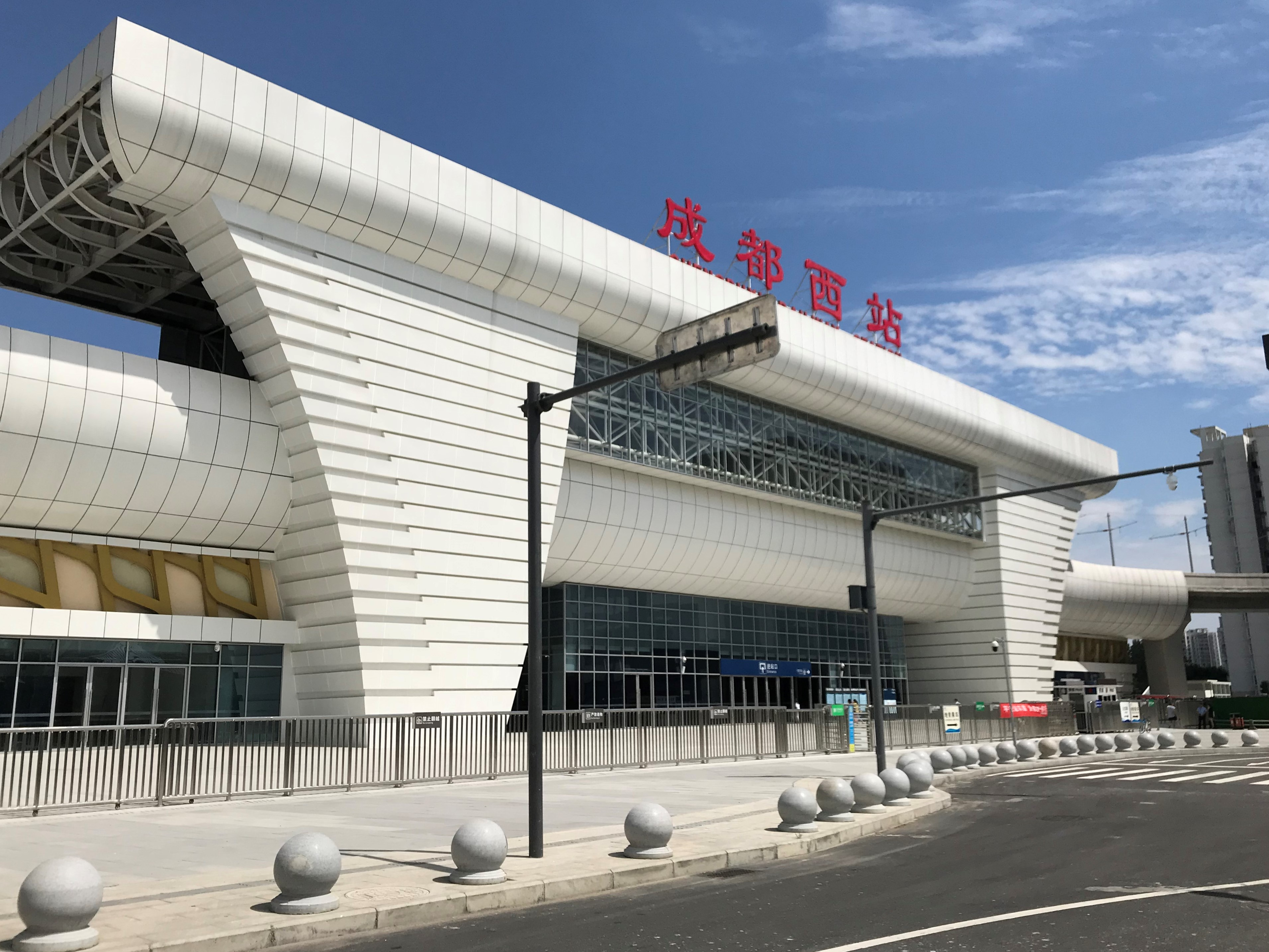

General information
- Other names: Chengduxi railway station
- Location: Qingyang District, Chengdu, Sichuan; China
- Coordinates: 30.68786°N 103.97673°E
- Operator: Chengdu Railway Bureau, China Railway Corporation
- Lines: Chengdu–Pujiang intercity railway Chengdu–Ya'an railway

Other information
- Station code: Telegraph code: CMW; Pinyin code: CDX

History
- Opened: 28 December 2018
Location

Chengdu West (Chinese: 成都西) is a railway station located in Qingyang District, Chengdu, Sichuan Province, China. It also serves as a transfer station between Line 4 and Line 9 of the Chengdu Metro and Line T2 of the Chengdu Tram.

== Gallery ==
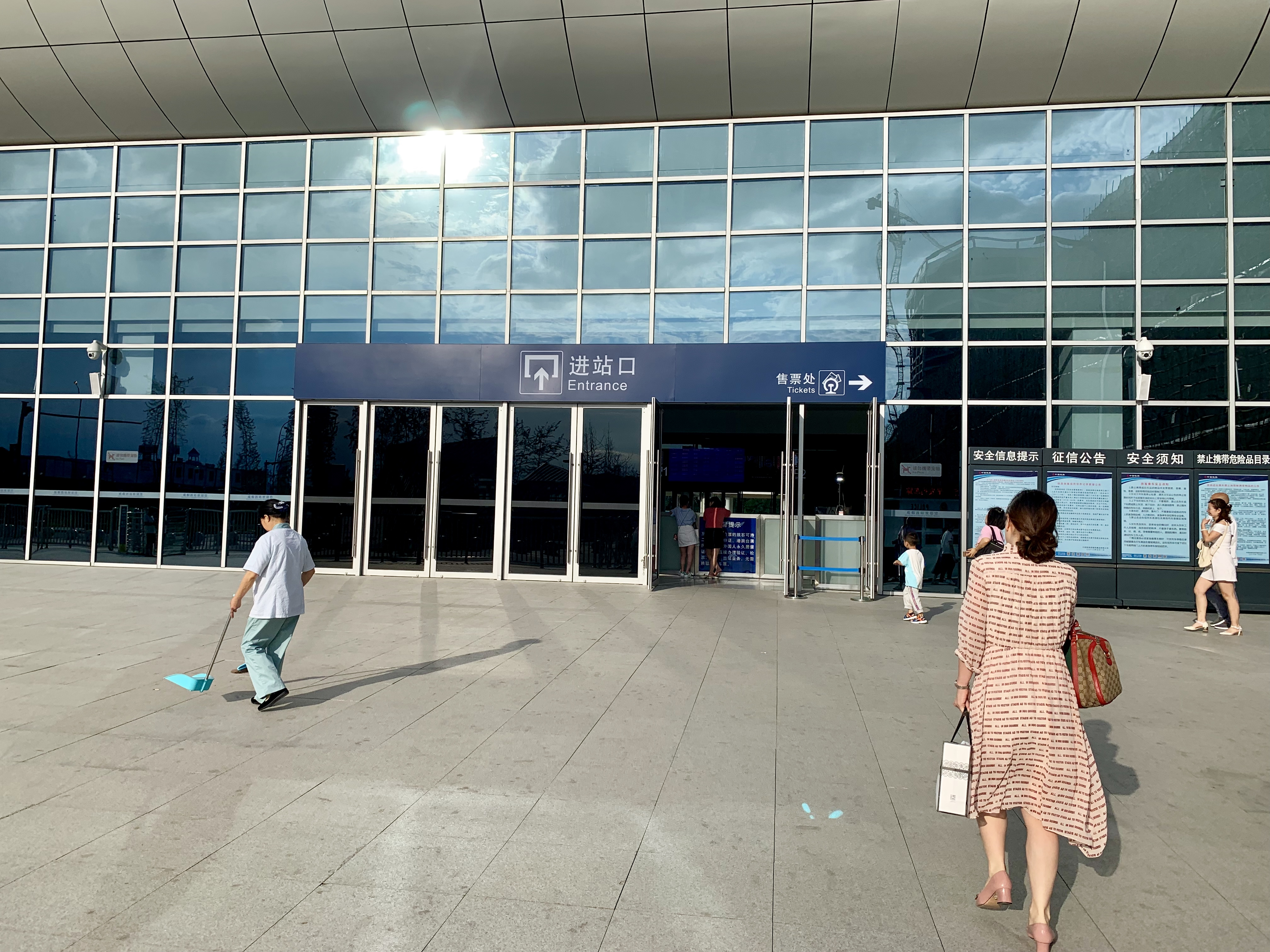
Entrance

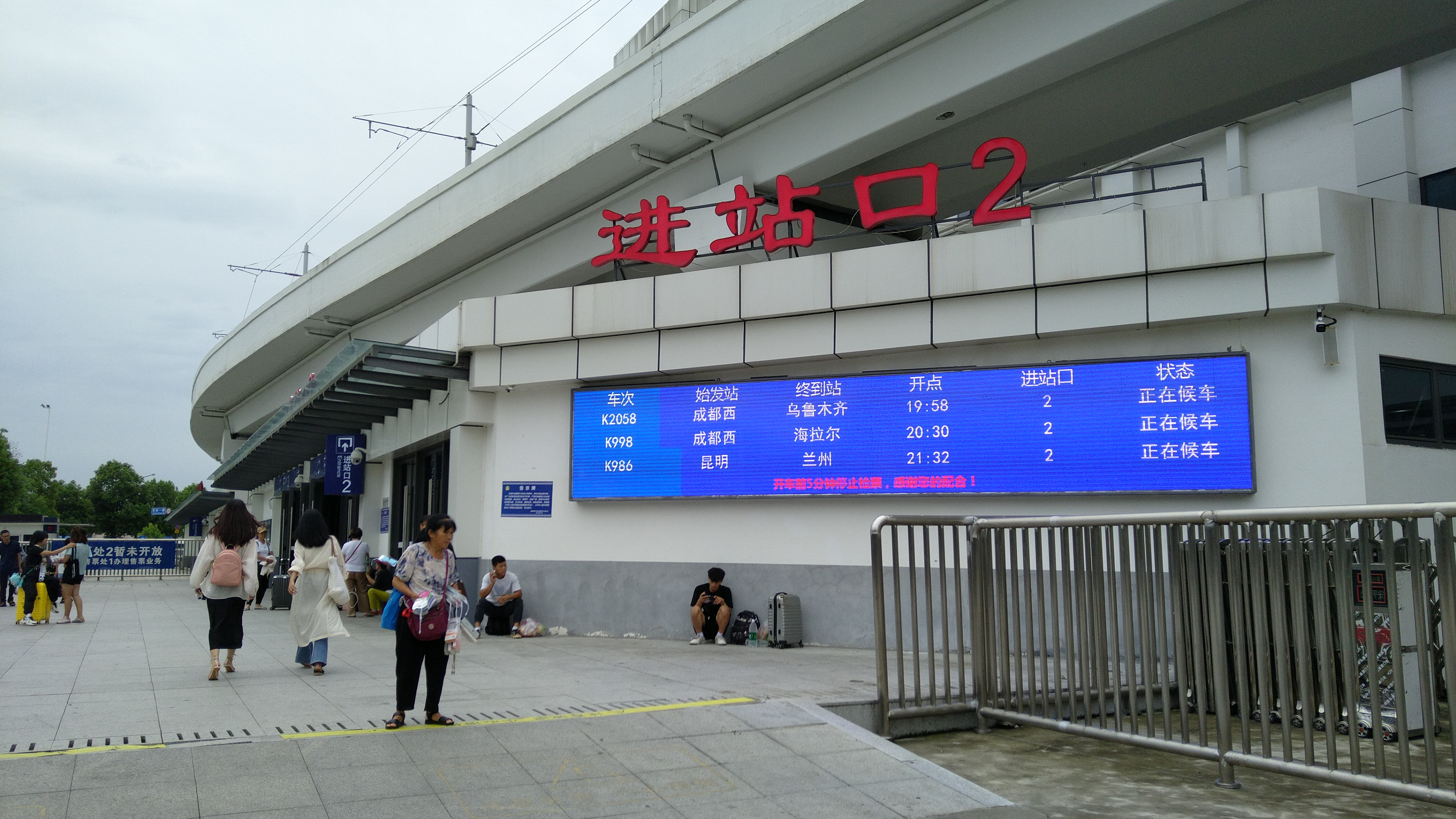
Entrance no.2

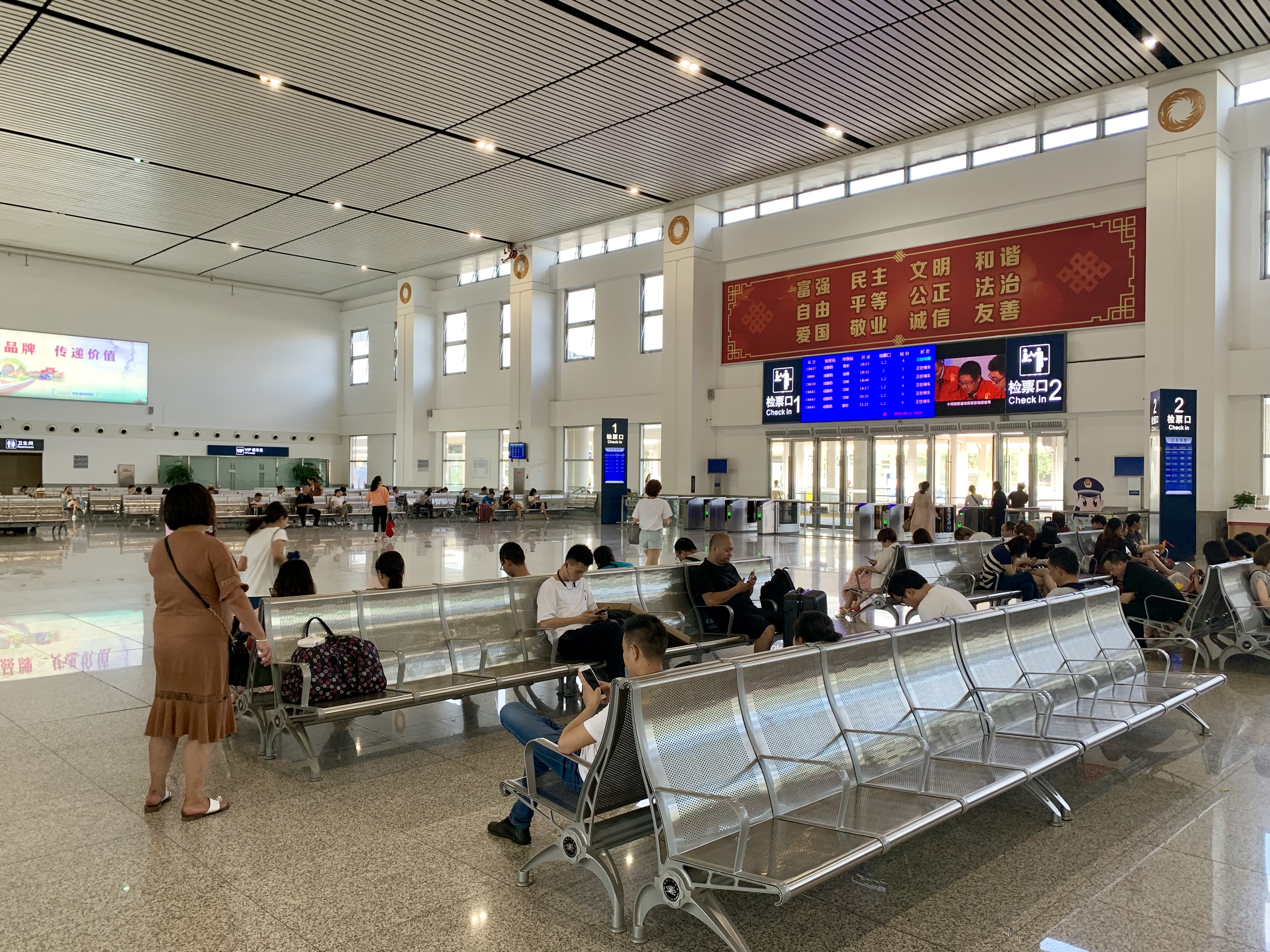
Concourse

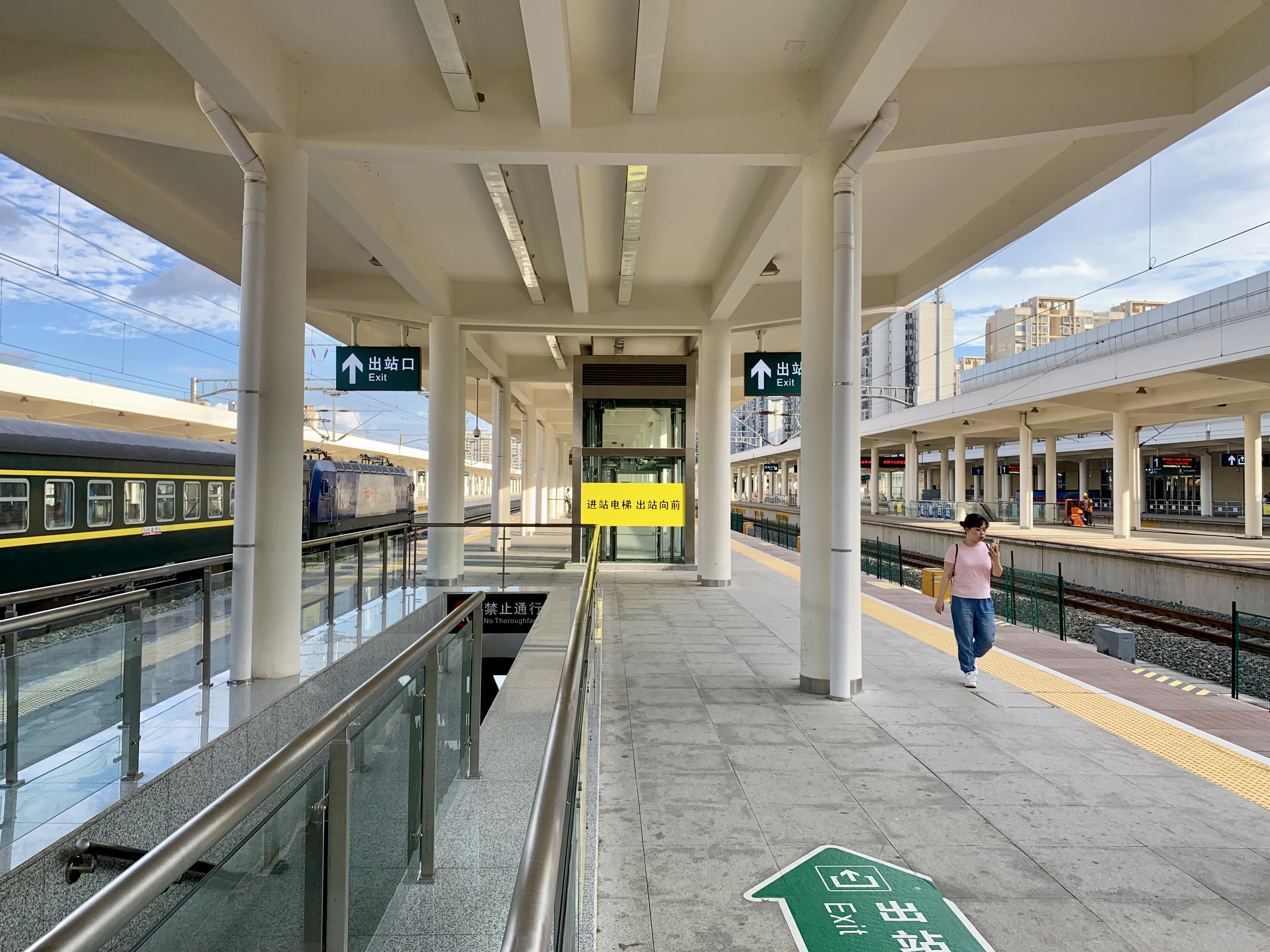
Platforms

== Chengdu Metro ==
Chengdu West Railway Station 成都西站
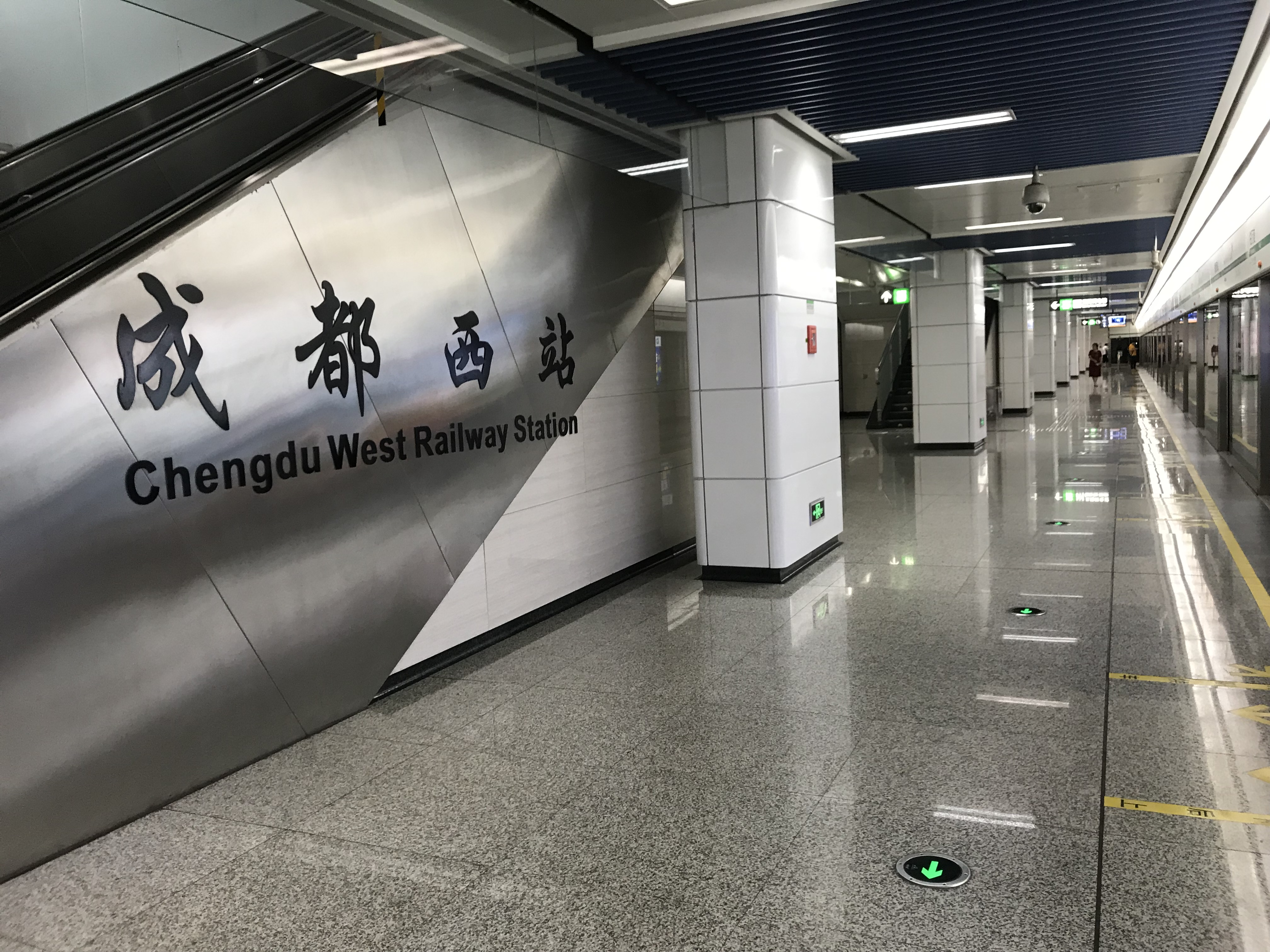

General information
- Location: Qingyang District, Chengdu, Sichuan; China
- Operator: Chengdu Metro Limited
- Lines: Line 4 Line 9
- Platforms: 4 (2 island platforms)

Other information
- Station code: 0419 0912

History
- Opened: 26 December 2015

Services
Preceding station	Chengdu Metro	Following station
Zhongba towards Wansheng	Line 4	Qingjiang West Road towards Xihe
Peifeng towards Financial City East	Line 9	Huangtianba Terminus
Location

Chengdu West Railway Station (Chinese: 成都西站) is a station on Line 4 and Line 9 of the Chengdu Metro. It serves the nearby Chengdu West railway station.

=== Station layout ===
G	Ground level	Exits
B1	Concourse	Faregates, Station Agent
B2	Westbound	← Line 4 towards Wansheng (Zhongba)
B2	Island platform, doors open on the left
B2	Eastbound	Line 4 towards Xihe (Qingjiang West Road) →
B3	Northbound	← Line 9 towards Huangtianba (Terminus)
B3	Island platform, doors open on the left
B3	Southbound	Line 9 towards Financial City East (Peifeng) →

=== Gallery ===
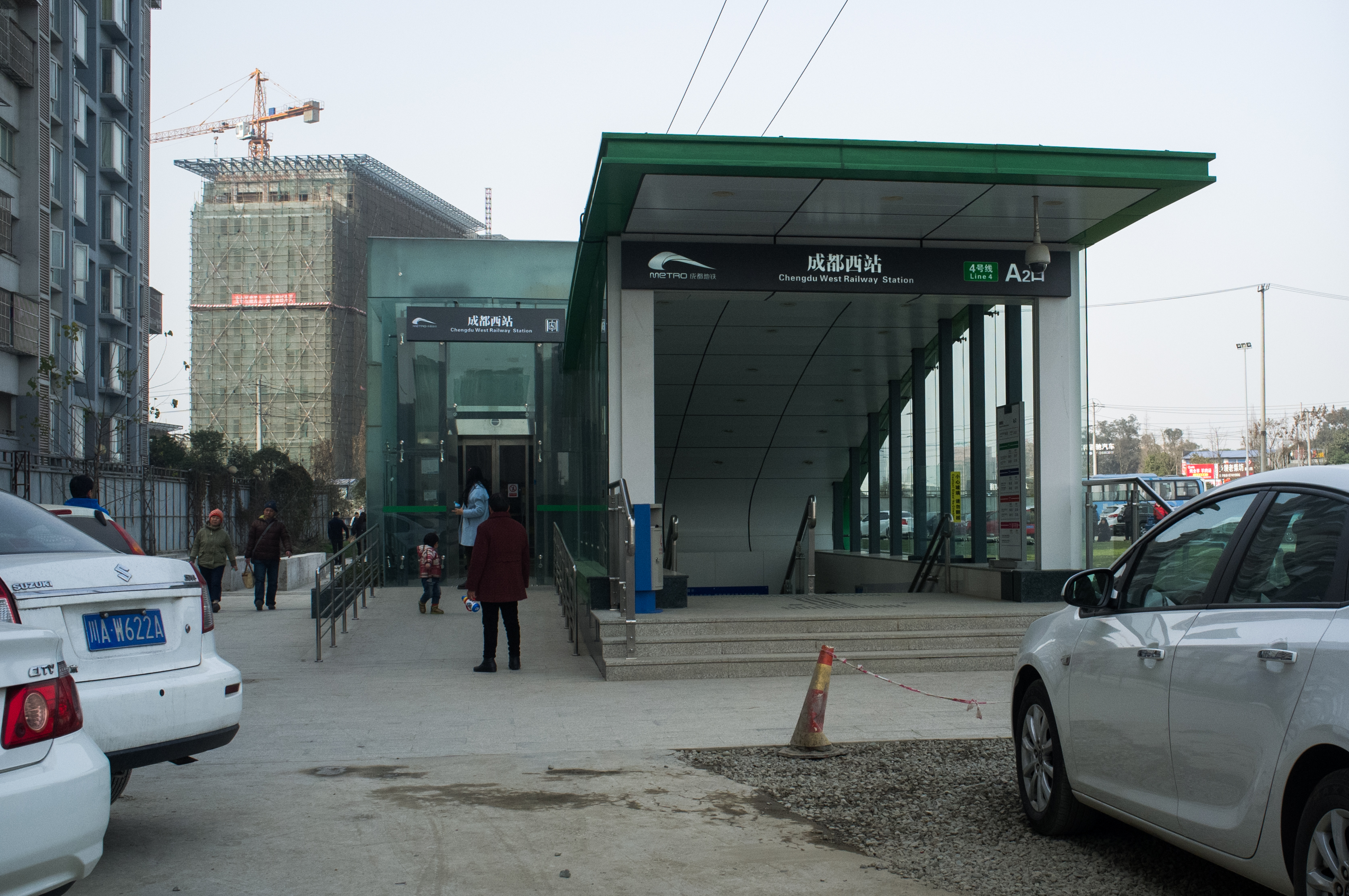
Entrance A2

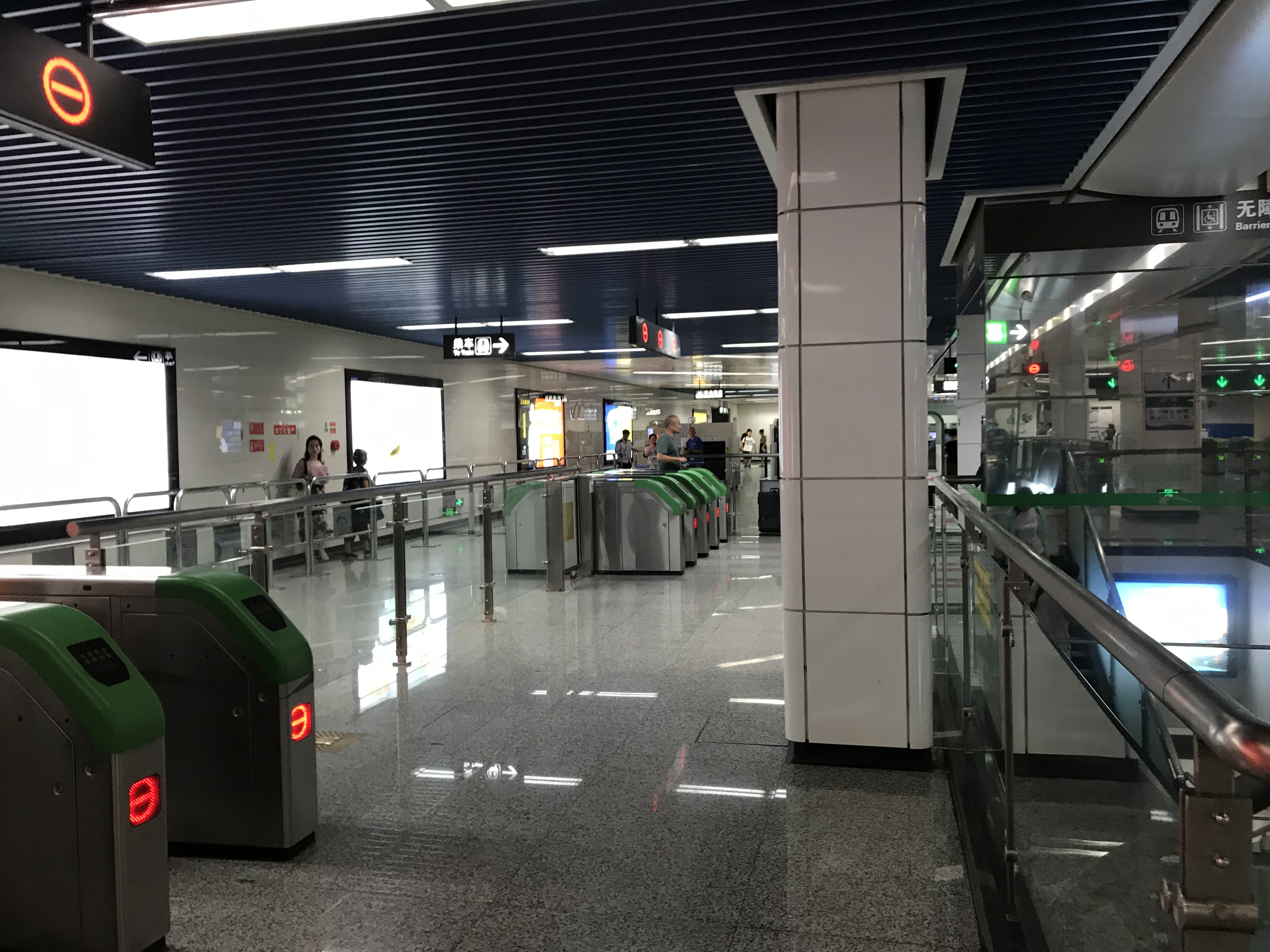
Concourse

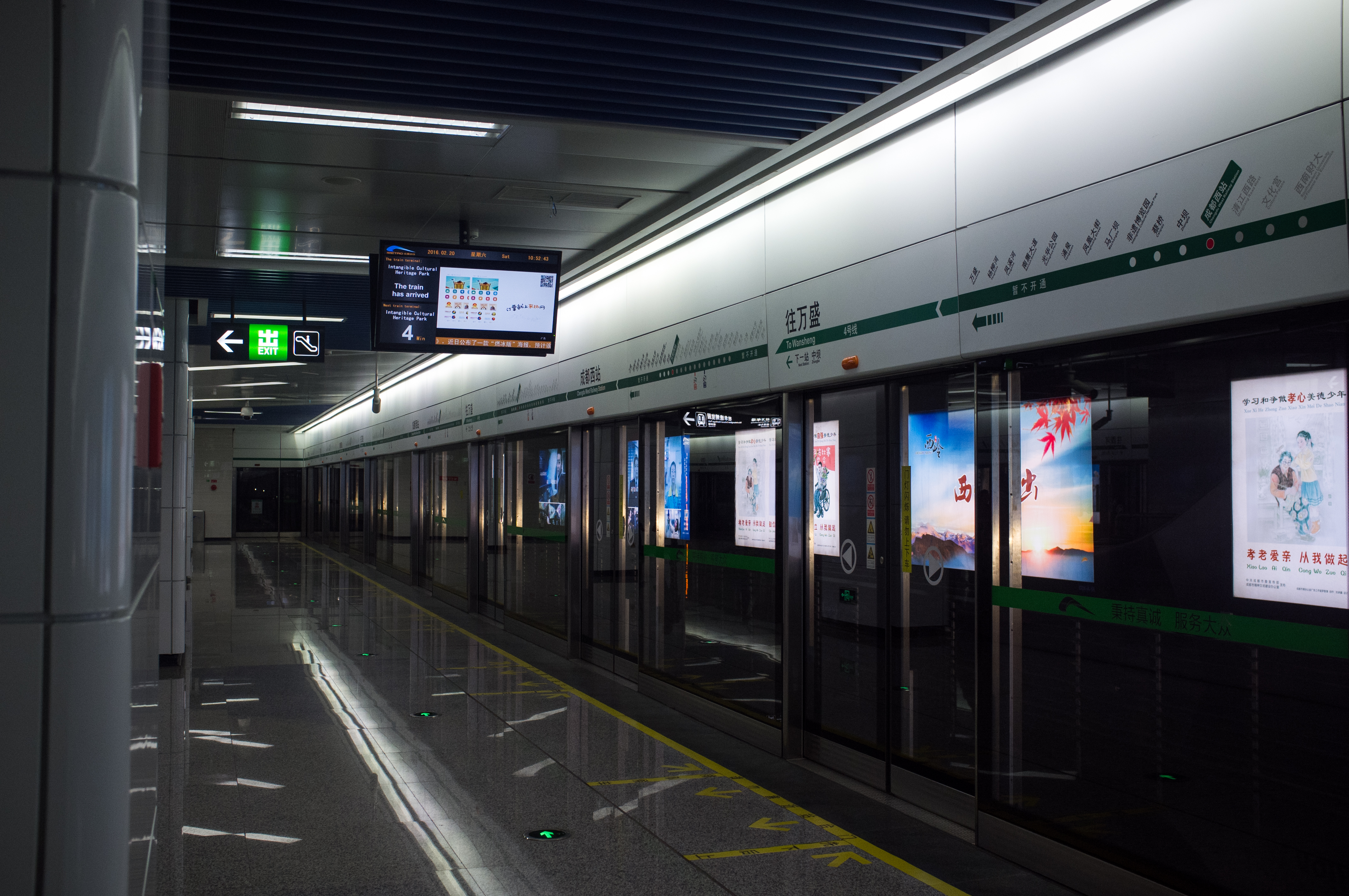
Line 4 platform
