= Kuanzhaixiangzi Alleys station =

Metro station in Chengdu, China

Kuanzhaixiangzi Alleys 宽窄巷子
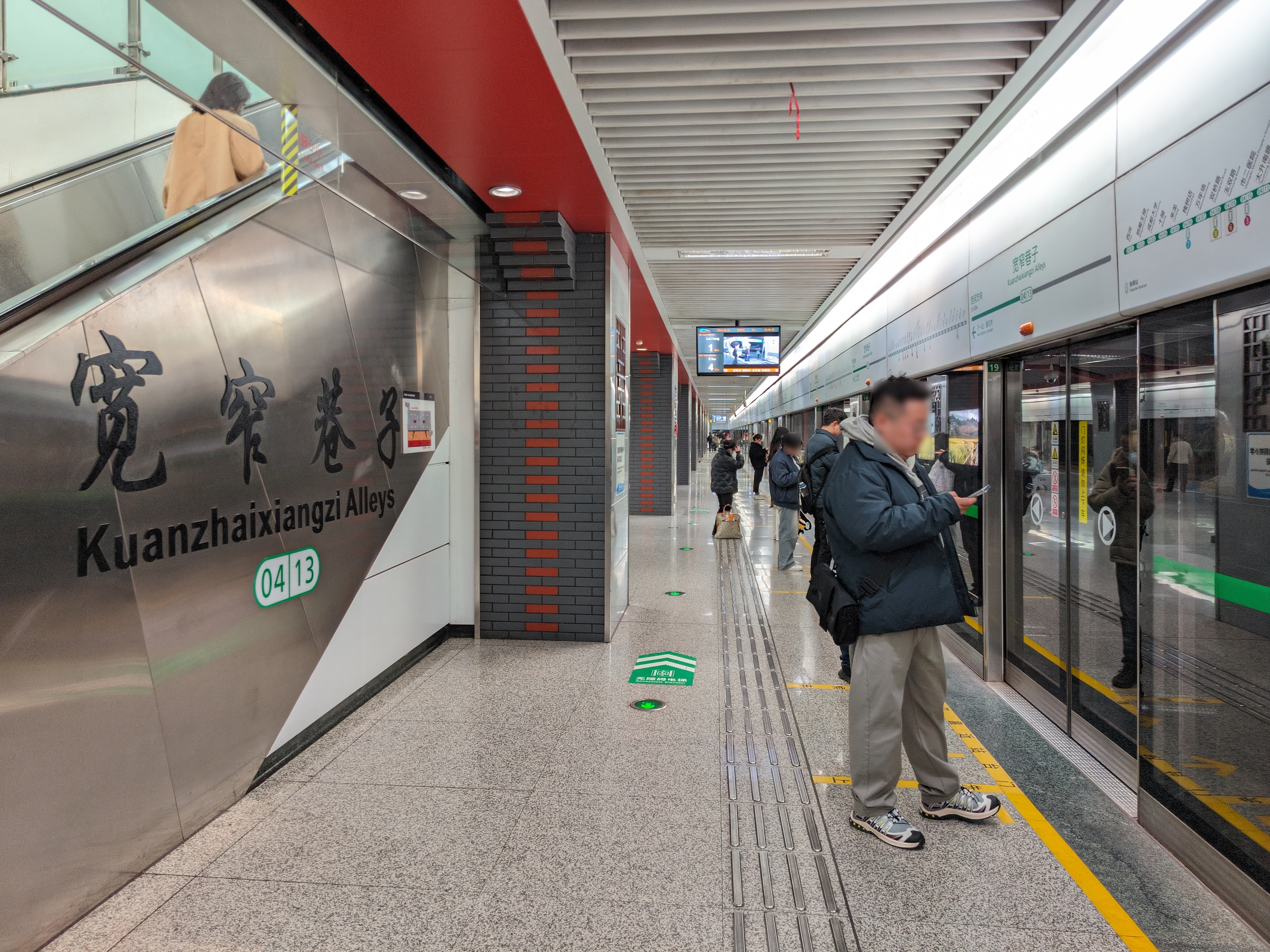

General information
- Location: Minshengli (民生里); Qingyang District, Chengdu, Sichuan; China
- Coordinates: 30°40′04″N 104°02′53″E
- Operated by: Chengdu Metro Limited
- Line: Line 4
- Platforms: 2 (1 island platform)

Other information
- Station code: 0413

History
- Opened: 26 December 2015

Services
Preceding station	Chengdu Metro	Following station
Chengdu University of TCM & Sichuan Provincial People's Hospital towards Wansheng	Line 4	Luomashi towards Xihe
Location

Kuanzhaixiangzi Alleys (simplified Chinese: 宽窄巷子; traditional Chinese: 寬窄巷子) is a station on Line 4 of the Chengdu Metro in China.

== Station layout ==
1F	Ground level	Exits
B1	Concourse	Self-Service Tickets, Customer Service Center
B2		← Line 4 towards Wansheng (Chengdu University of TCM & Sichuan Provincial People's Hospital) →
B2	Island Platform, doors will open on the left
B2		Line 4 towards Xihe (Luomashi)

=== Entrances/exits ===
- B: Xiatongren Road (下同仁路), Minshengli, Kuan Zhai Alleys
- D: Minshengli, Tonghuimen Road (通惠门路)

== Gallery ==
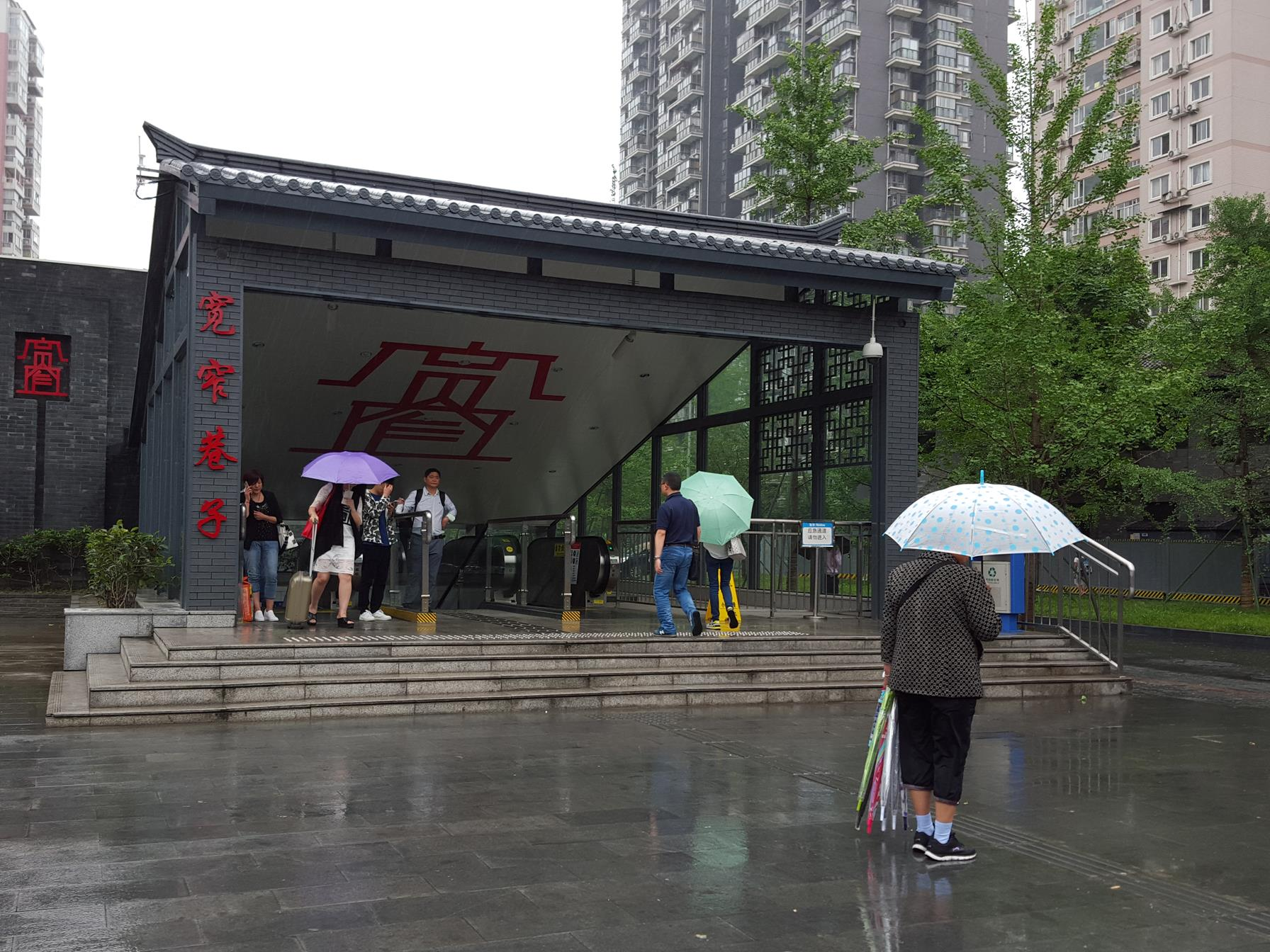
Entrance B

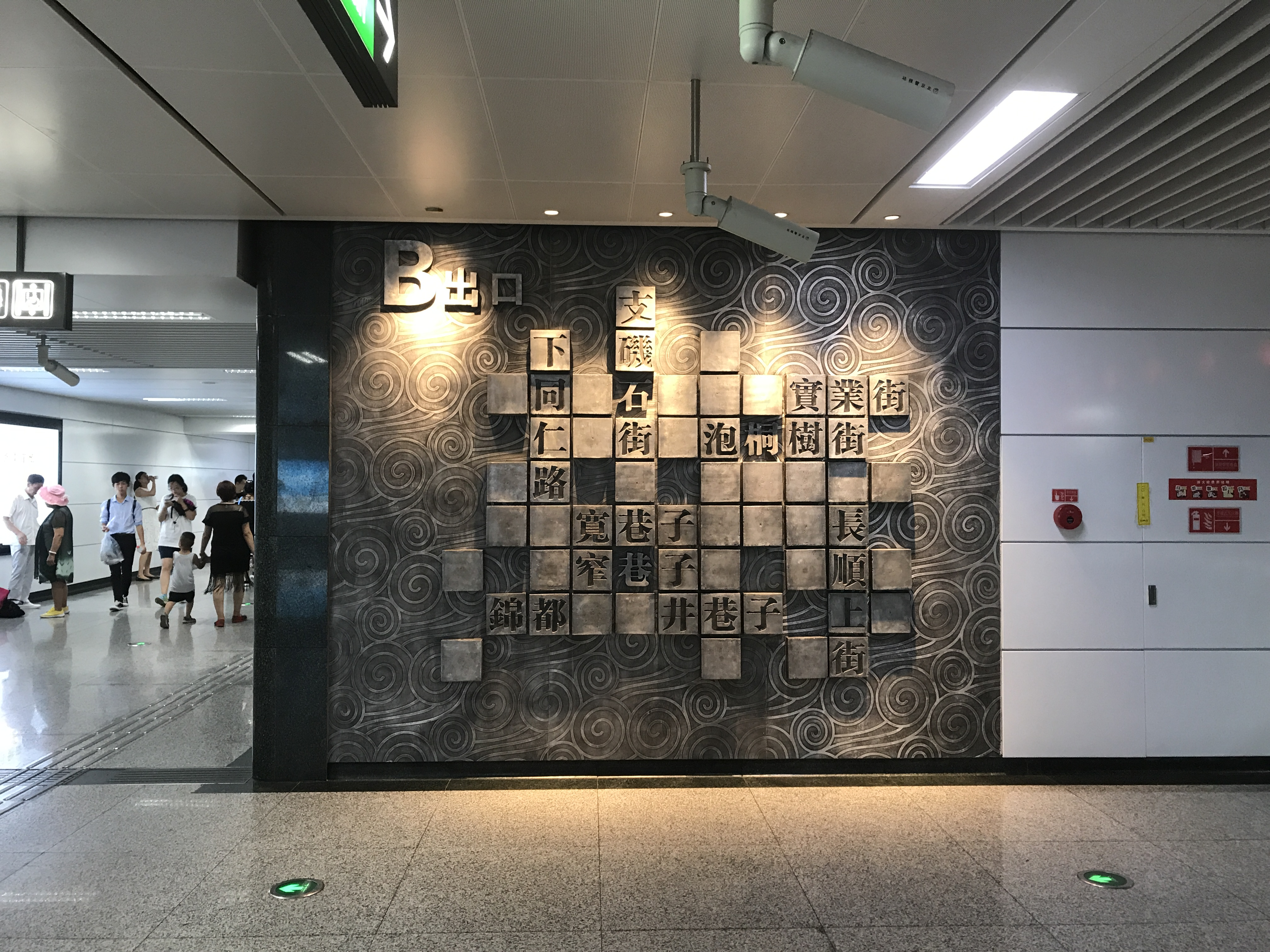
Artwall

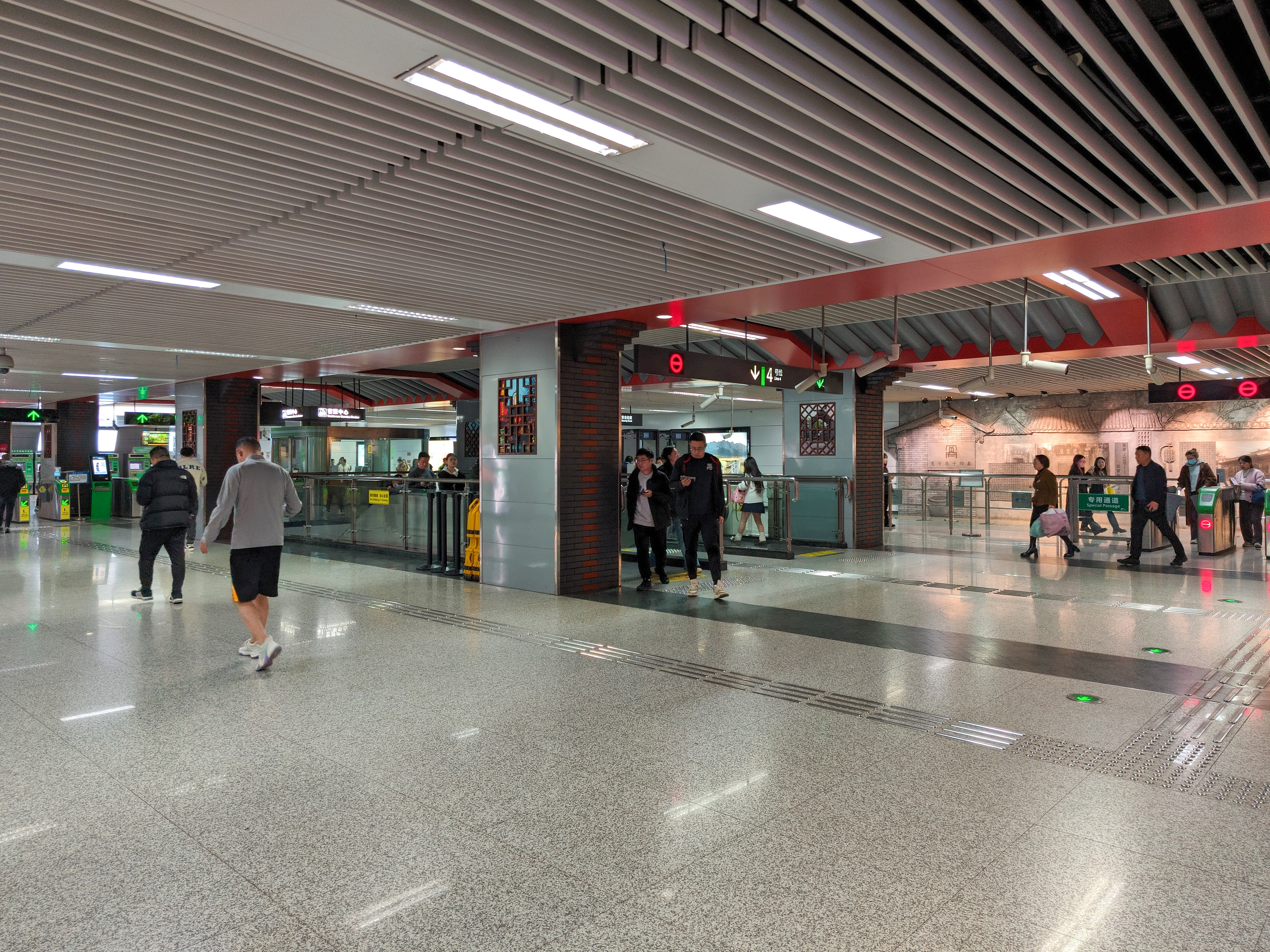
Concourse

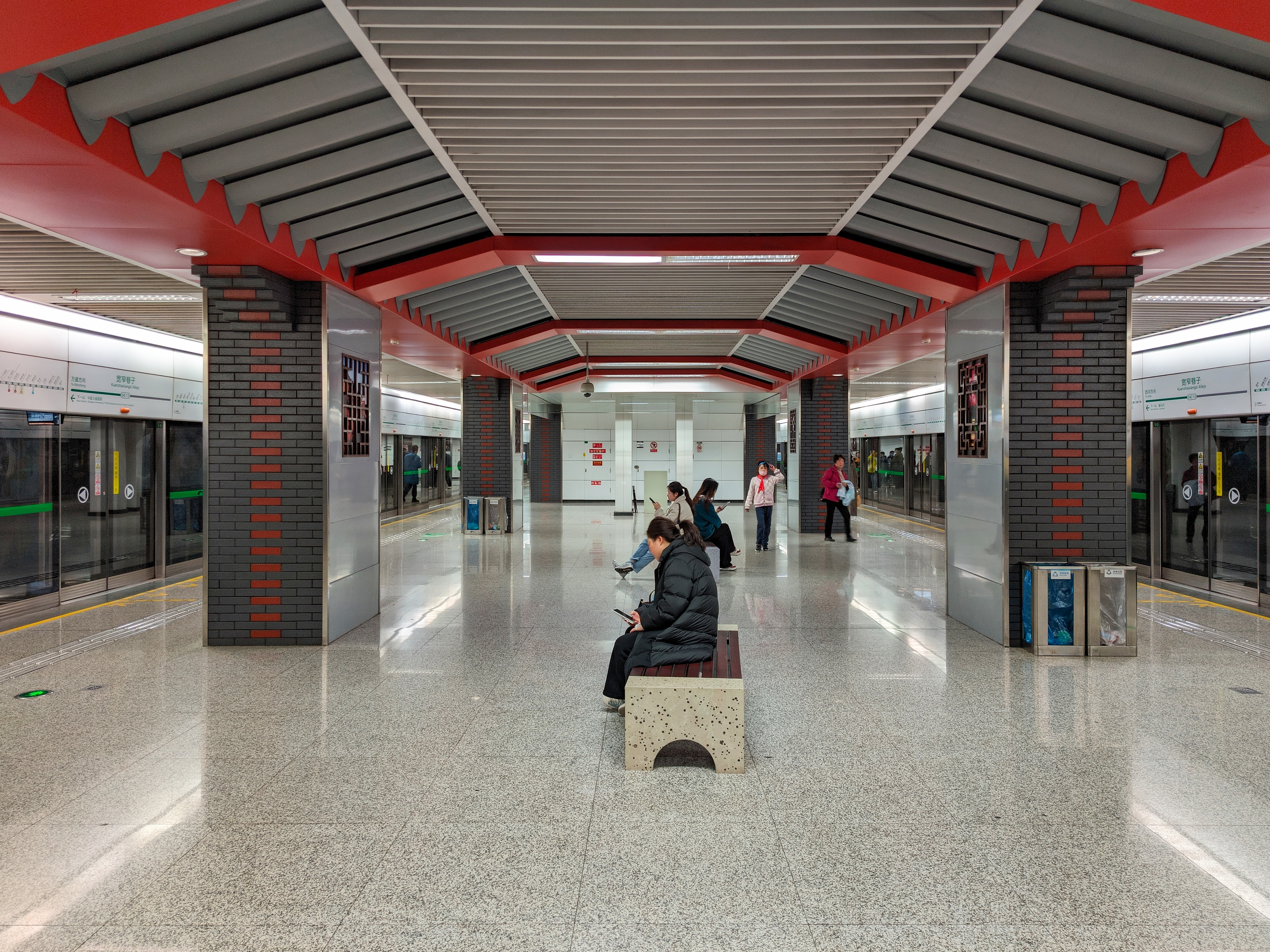
Platform
