= Renmin North Road station =

Metro station in Chengdu, China

Renmin North Road 人民北路
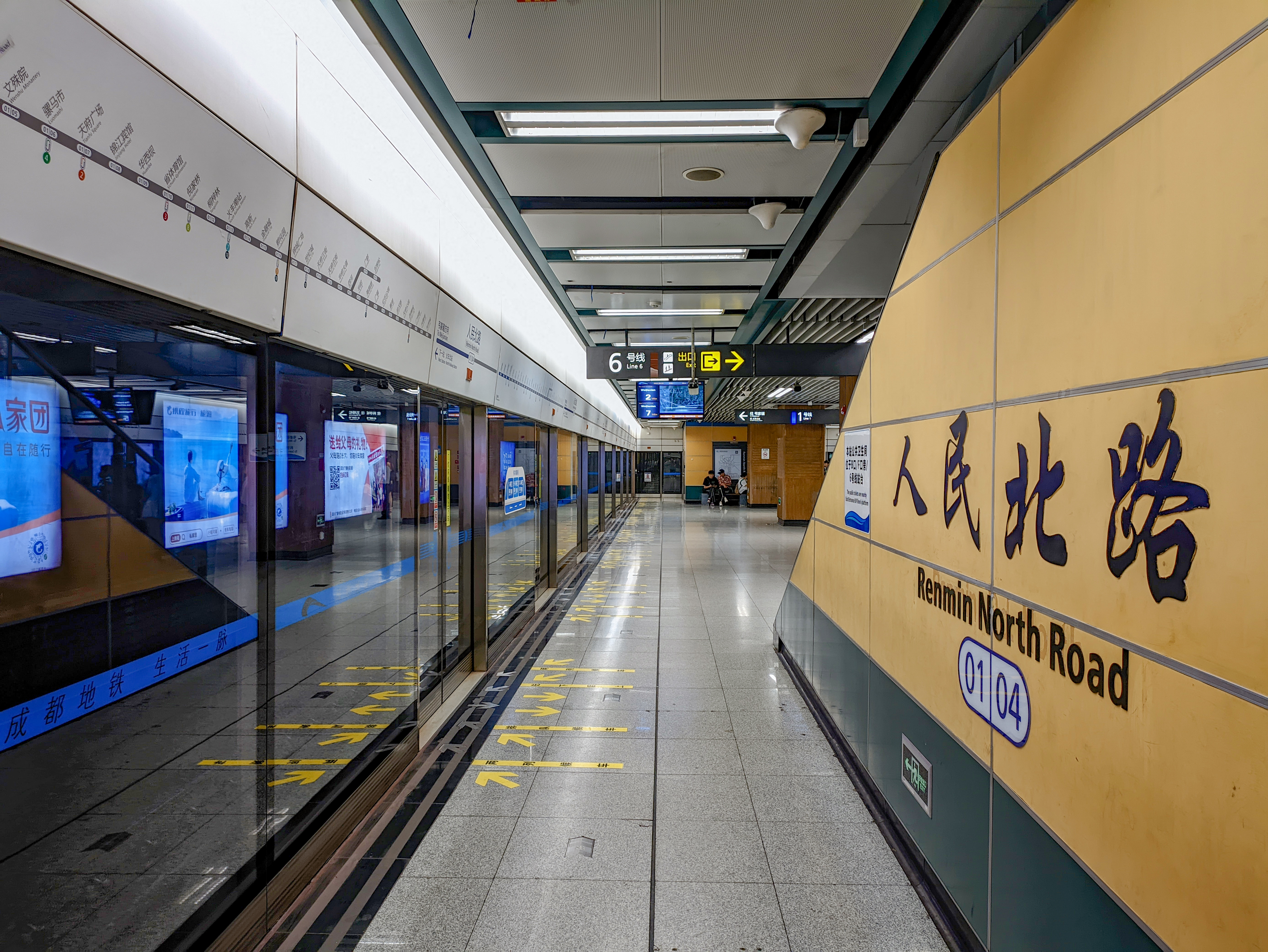
- Line 1 platform

General information
- Location: Jinniu District, Chengdu, Sichuan; China
- Coordinates: 30.6764°N 104.0692°E
- Operator: Chengdu Metro Limited
- Lines: Line 1 Line 6
- Platforms: 4 (2 island platforms)

Other information
- Station code: 0104 0621

History
- Opened: 27 September 2010
- Former names: Renmin Rd. North

Services
Preceding station	Chengdu Metro	Following station
North Railway Station towards Weijianian	Line 1	Wenshu Monastery towards Science City or Wugensong
Xibei Bridge towards Wangcong Temple	Line 6	Liangjiaxiang towards Lanjiagou
Location

Renmin North Road (Chinese: 人民北路; formerly known as Renmin Rd. North) is a metro station on Line 1 and Line 6 of the Chengdu Metro in China.

== Station layout ==
G	Ground level	Exits B, D-G
B1	Concourse	Faregates, Station Agent
B2	Northbound	← Line 1 towards Weijianian (North Railway Station)
B2	Island platform, doors open on the left
B2	Southbound	Line 1 towards Science City (Wenshu Monastery) →
B3	Northbound	← Line 6 to Wangcong Temple (Xibei Bridge)
B3	Island platform, doors open on the left
B3	Southbound	Line 6 to Lanjiagou (Liangjiaxiang) →

== Gallery ==
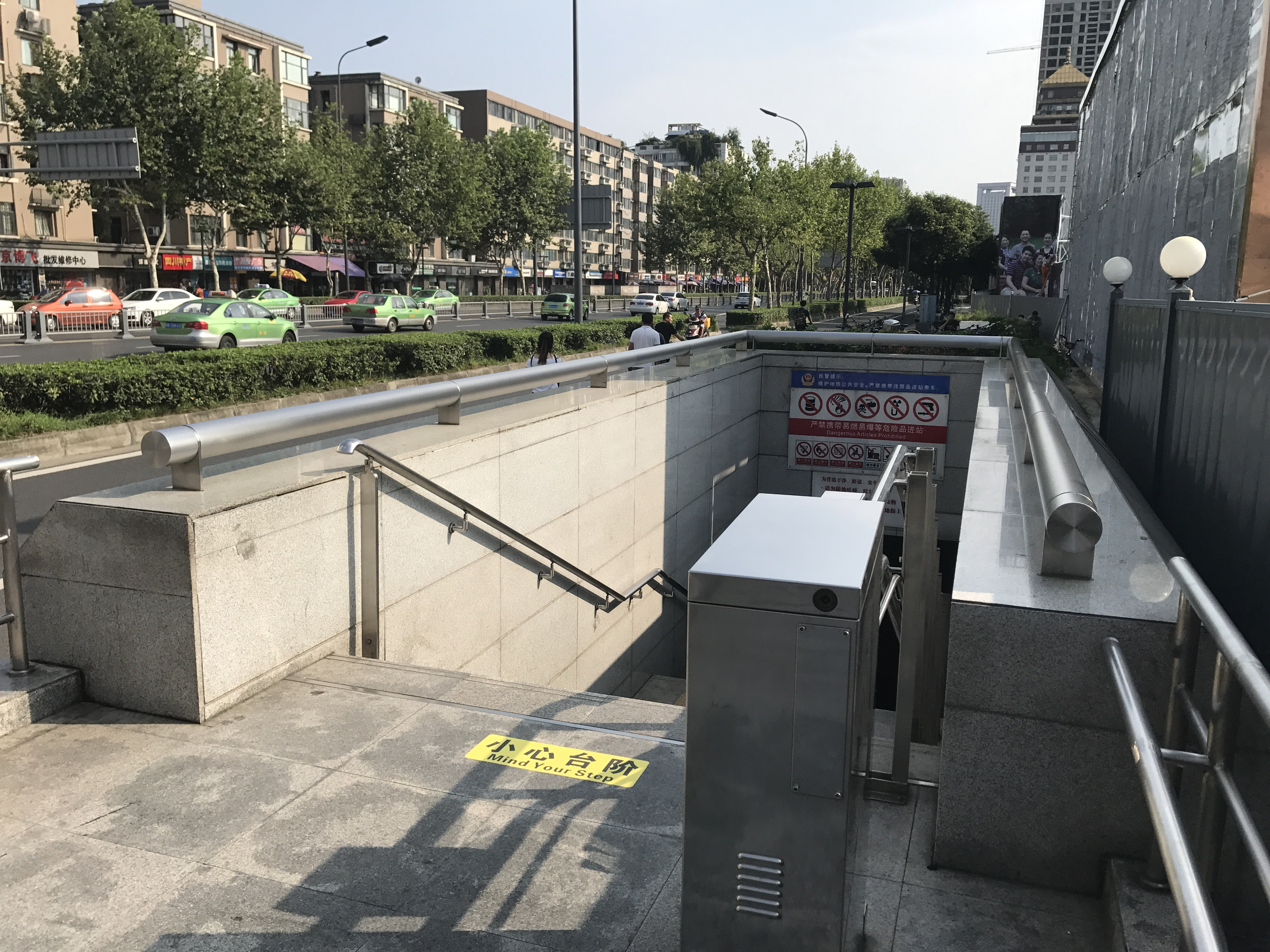
Entrance B

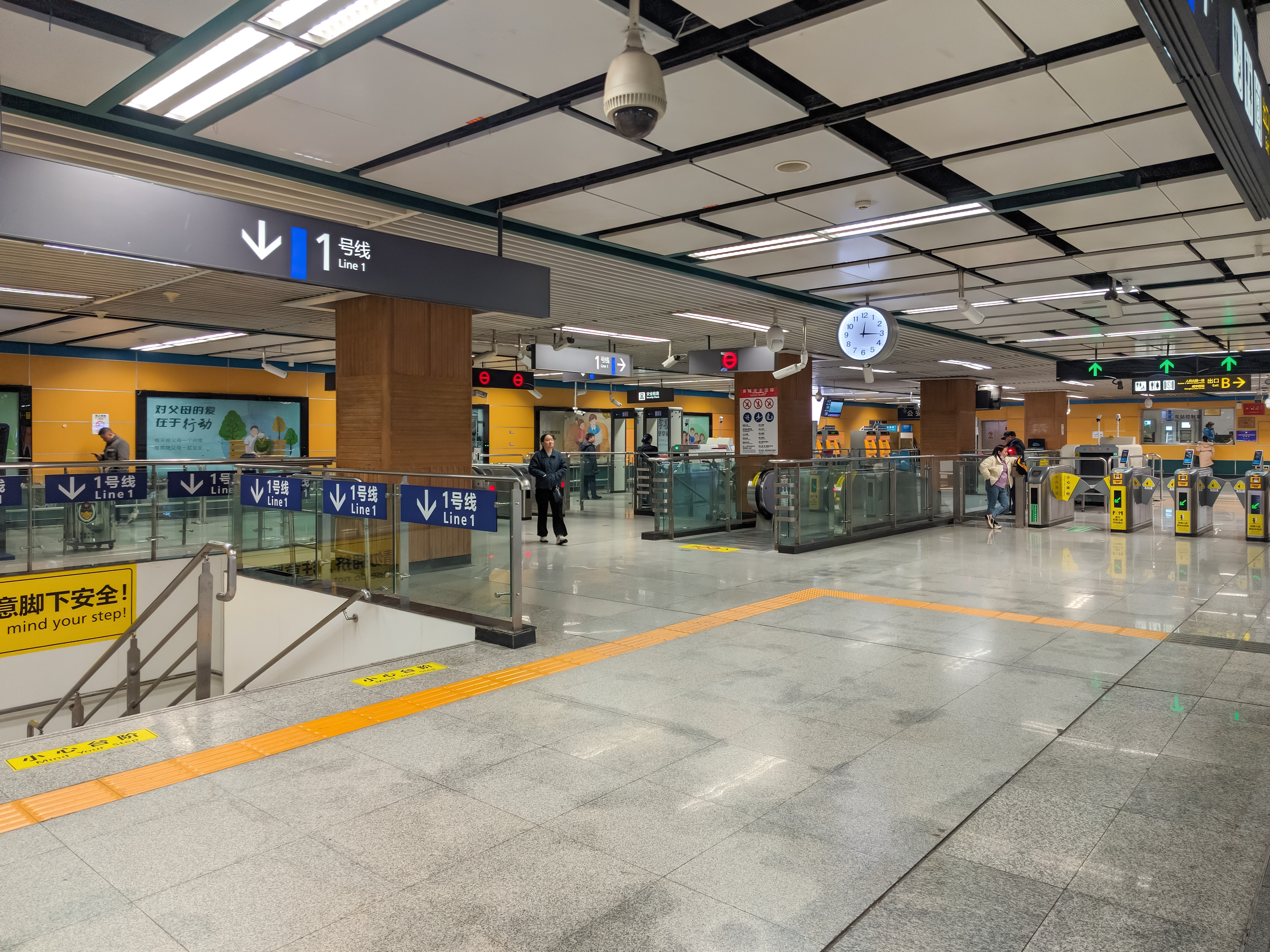
Line 1 concourse

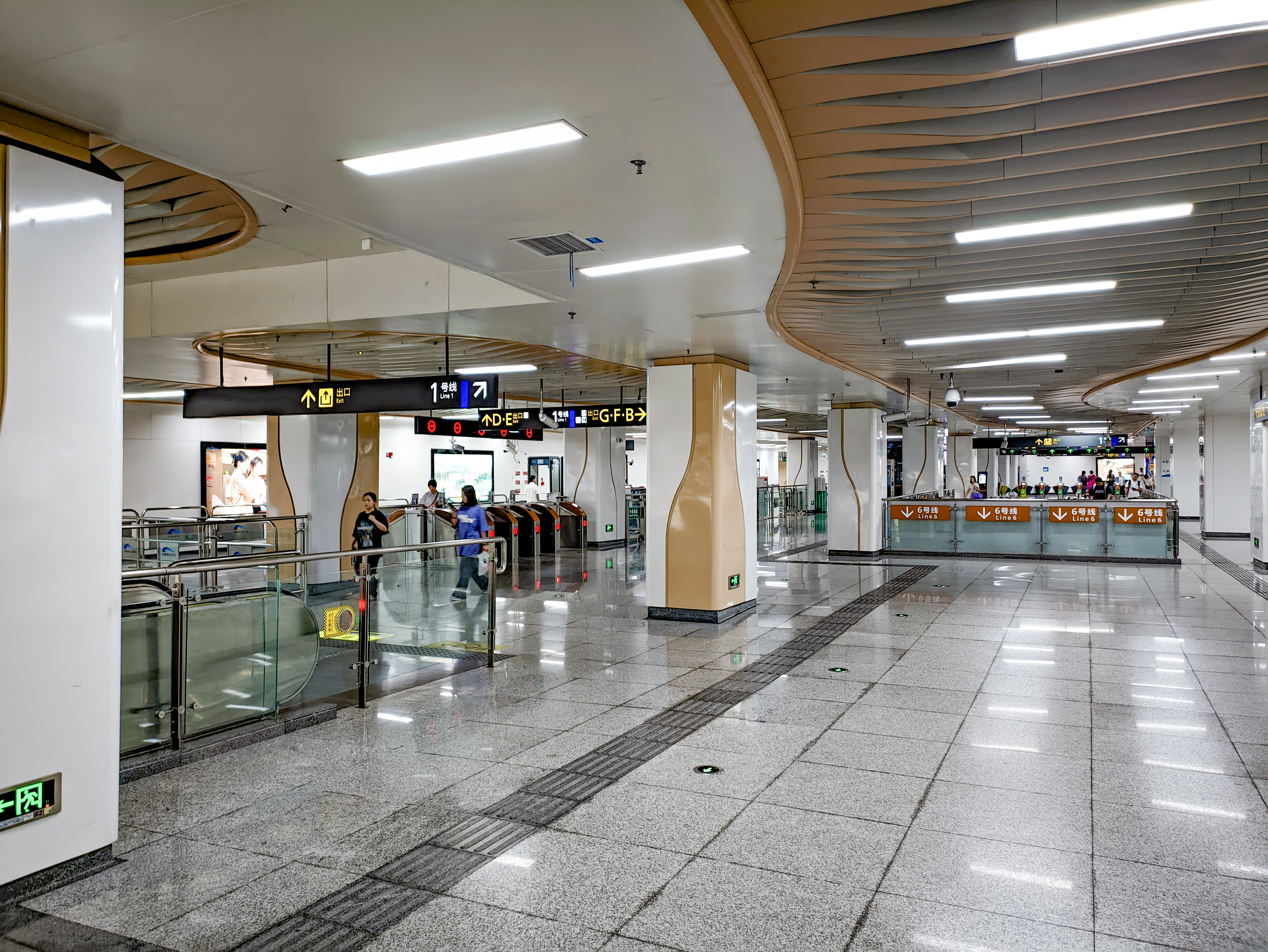
Line 6 concourse

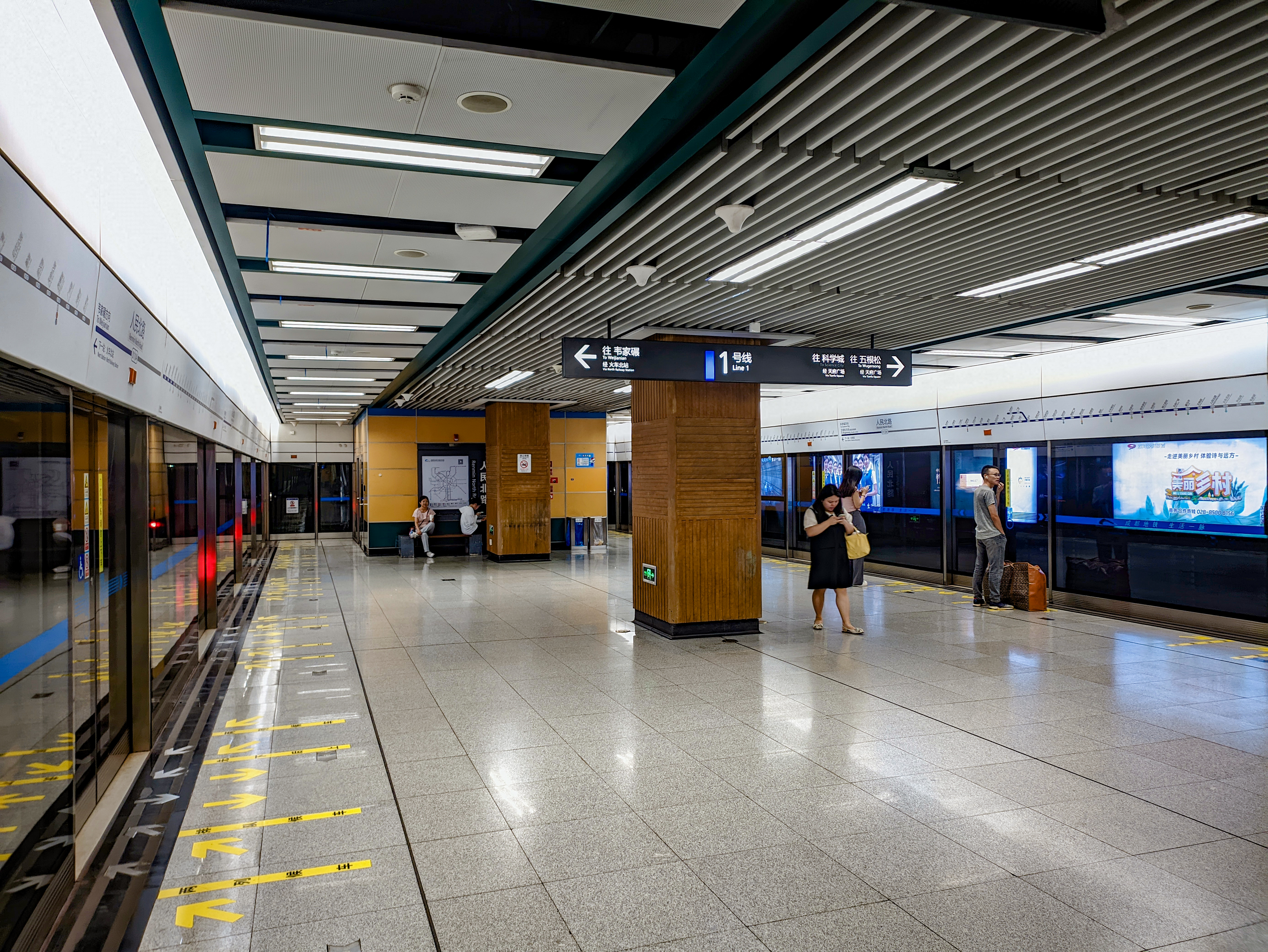
Line 1 platform

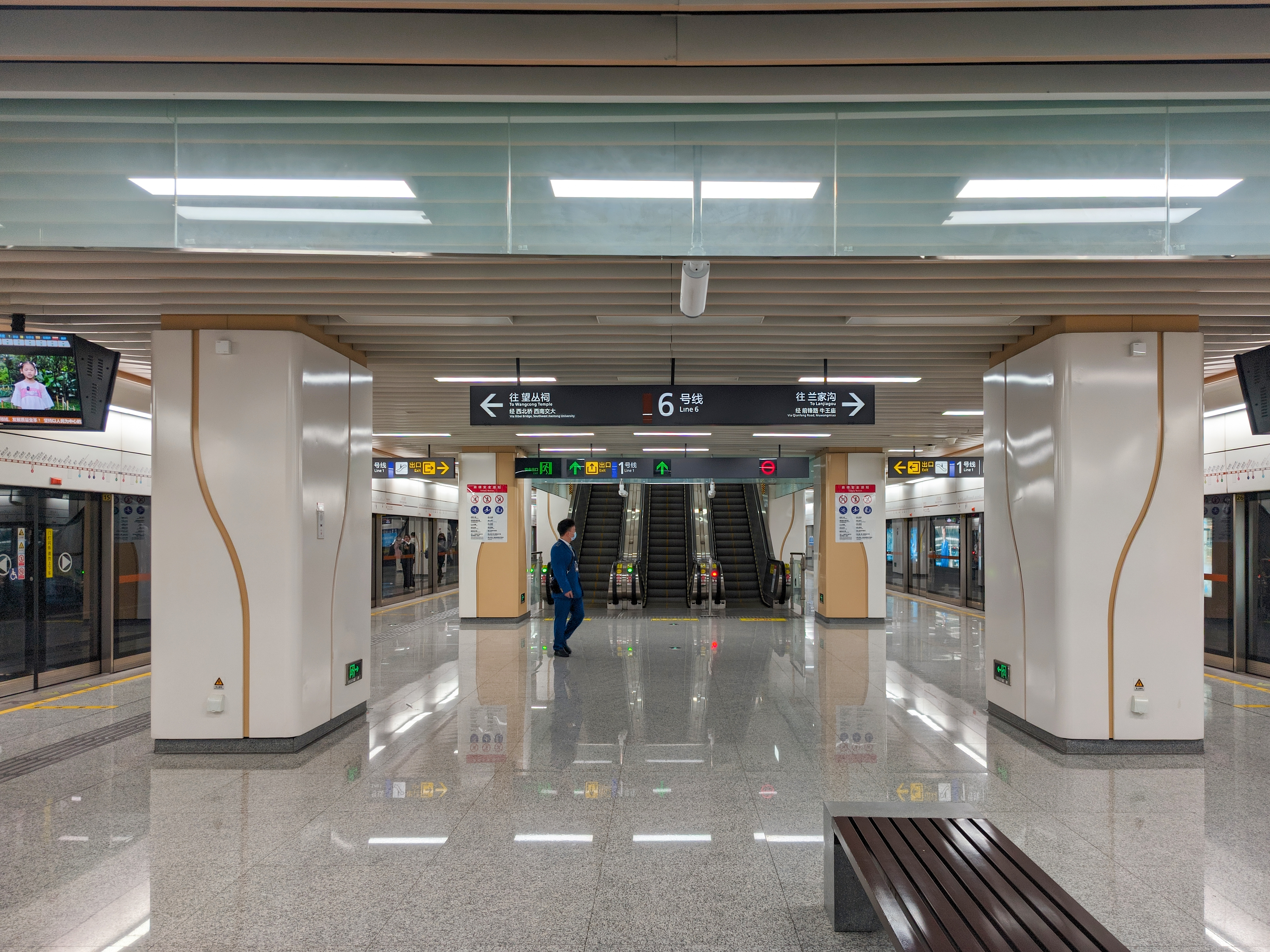
Line 6 platform
