= Wenshu Monastery station =

Metro station in Chengdu, China

Wenshu Monastery 文殊院
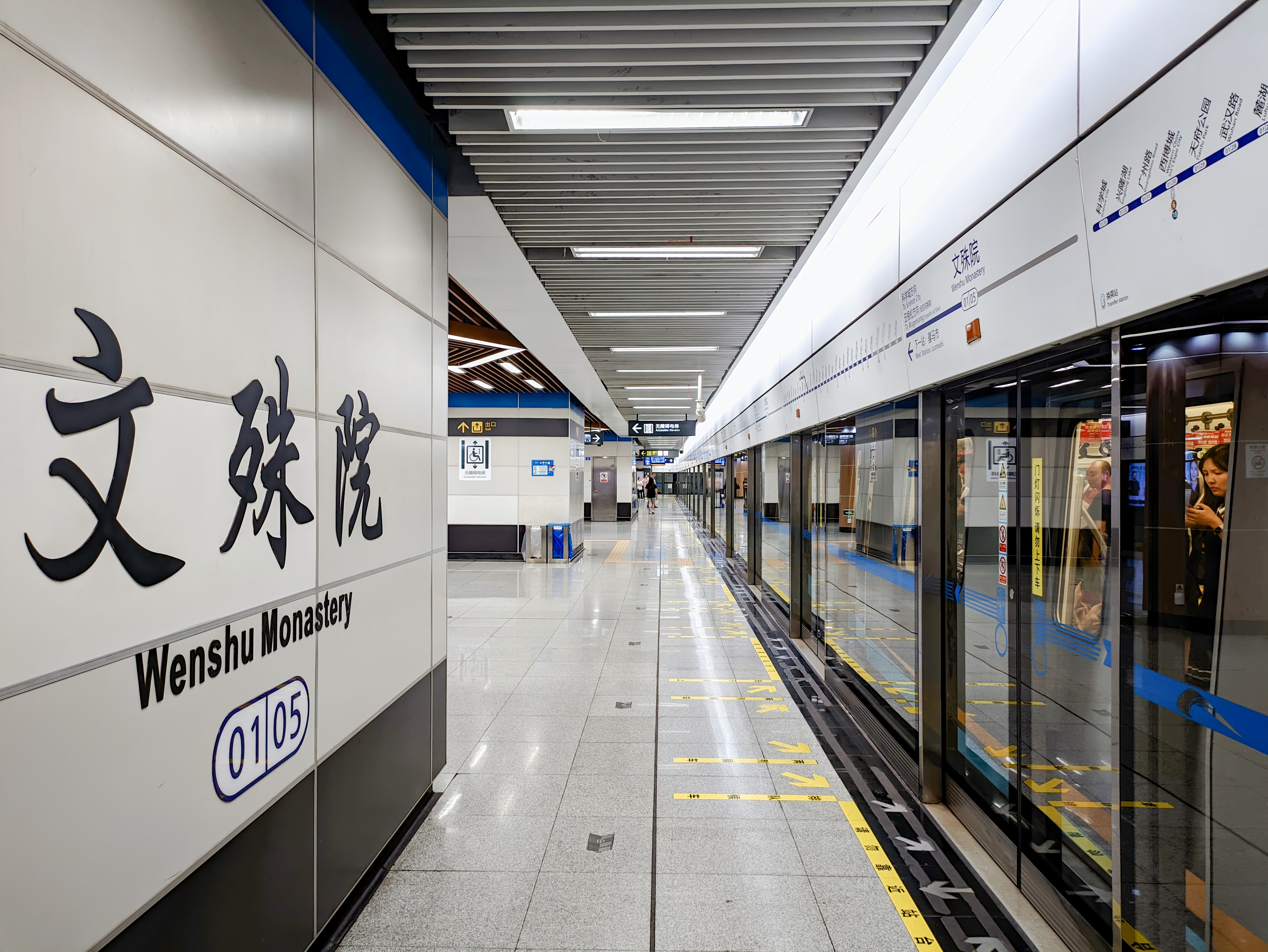
- Platform

General information
- Location: Renmin Road North Section 3 Qingyang District, Chengdu, Sichuan; China
- Coordinates: 30.6769°N 104.0686°E
- Operator: Chengdu Metro Limited
- Line: Line 1
- Platforms: 2 (1 island platform)

Other information
- Station code: 0105

History
- Opened: 27 September 2010

Services
Preceding station	Chengdu Metro	Following station
Renmin North Road towards Weijianian	Line 1	Luomashi towards Science City or Wugensong
Location

Wenshu Monastery (Chinese: 文殊院) is a metro station on Line 1 of the Chengdu Metro in China. It serves the nearby Wenshu Monastery.

== Station layout ==
G	Ground level	Exits
B1	Concourse	Faregates, Station Agent
B2	Northbound	← Line 1 towards Weijianian (Renmin North Road)
B2	Island platform, doors open on the left
B2	Southbound	Line 1 towards Science City (Luomashi) →

== Gallery ==
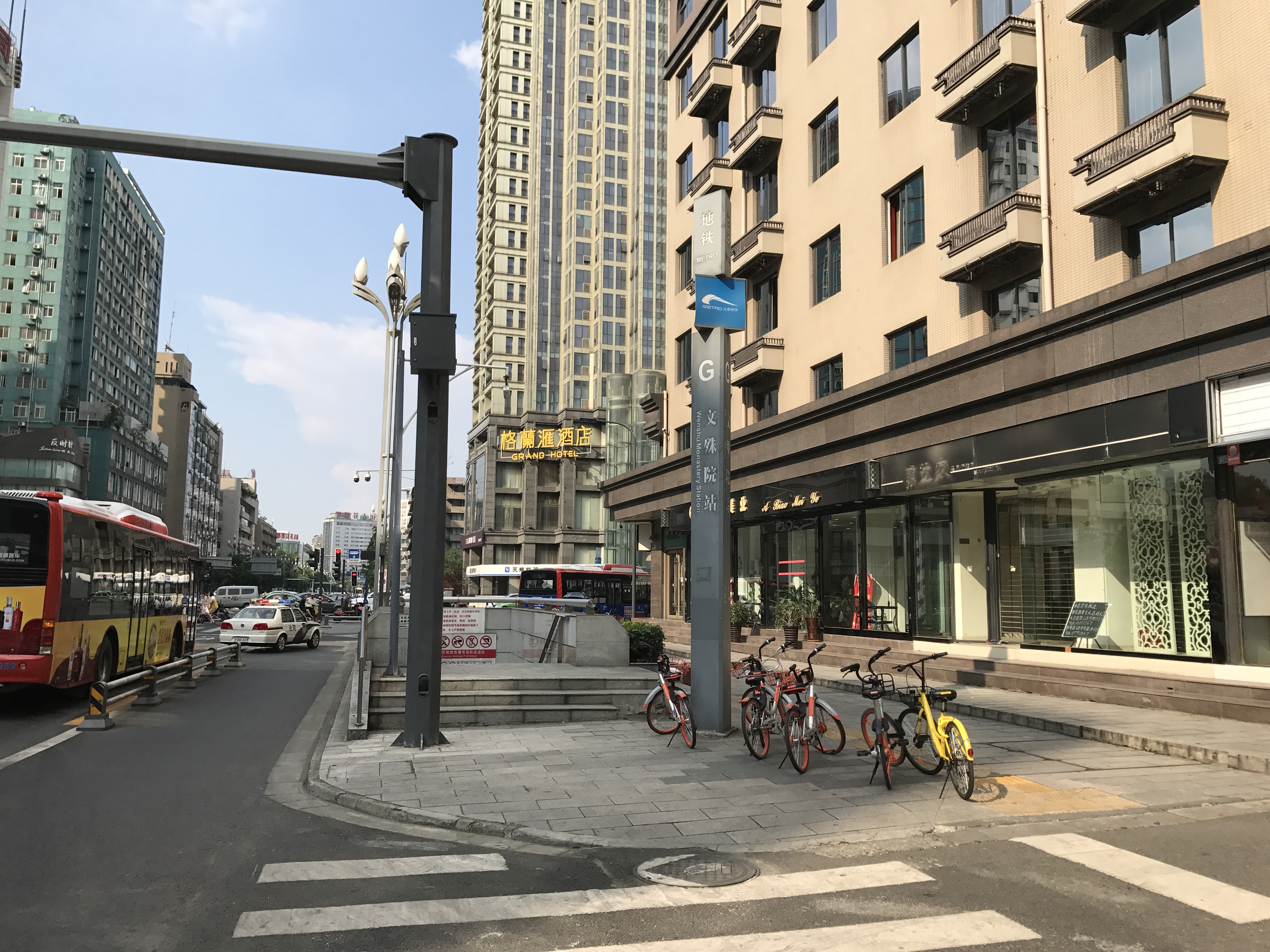
Entrance G

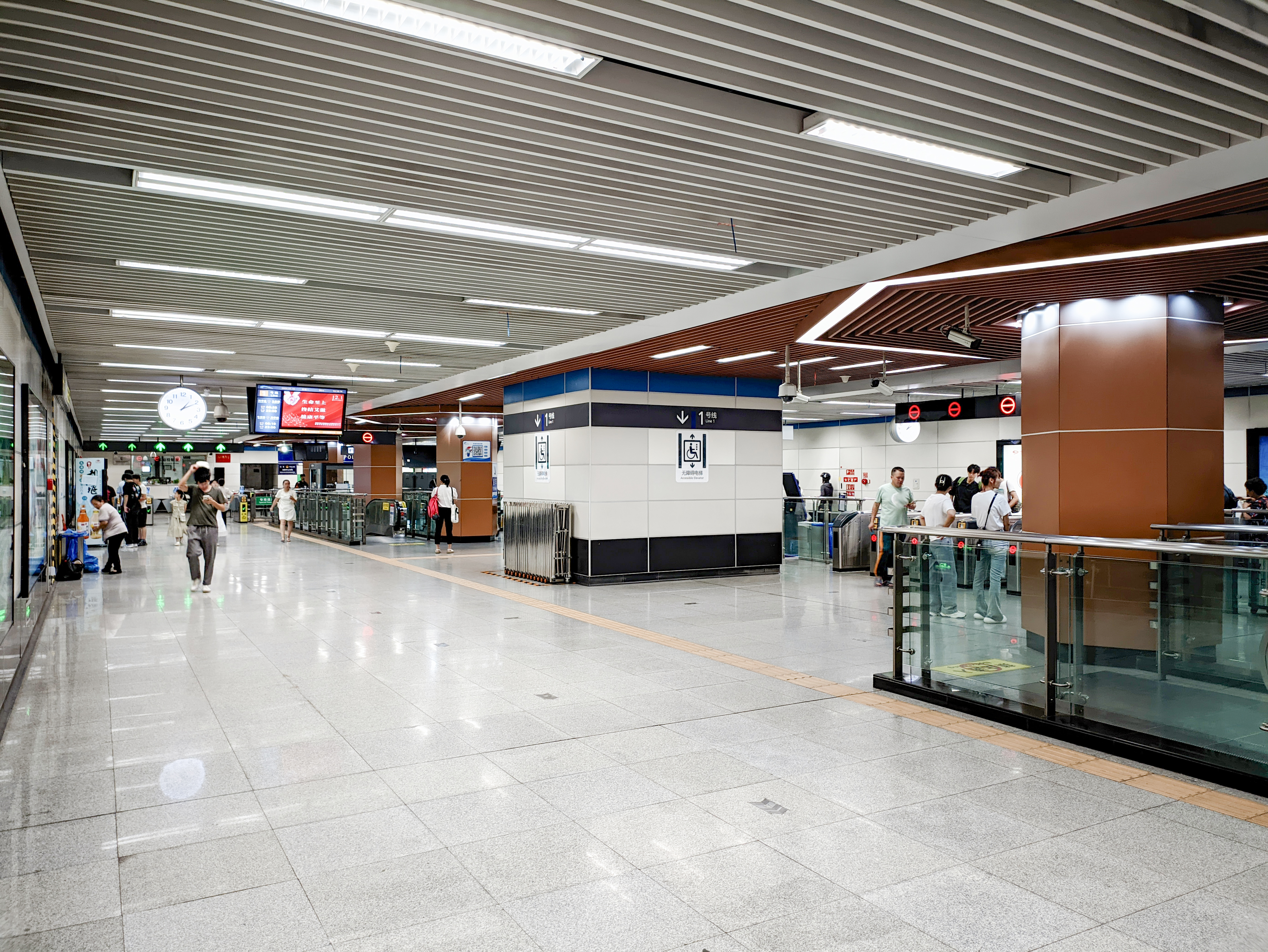
Concourse

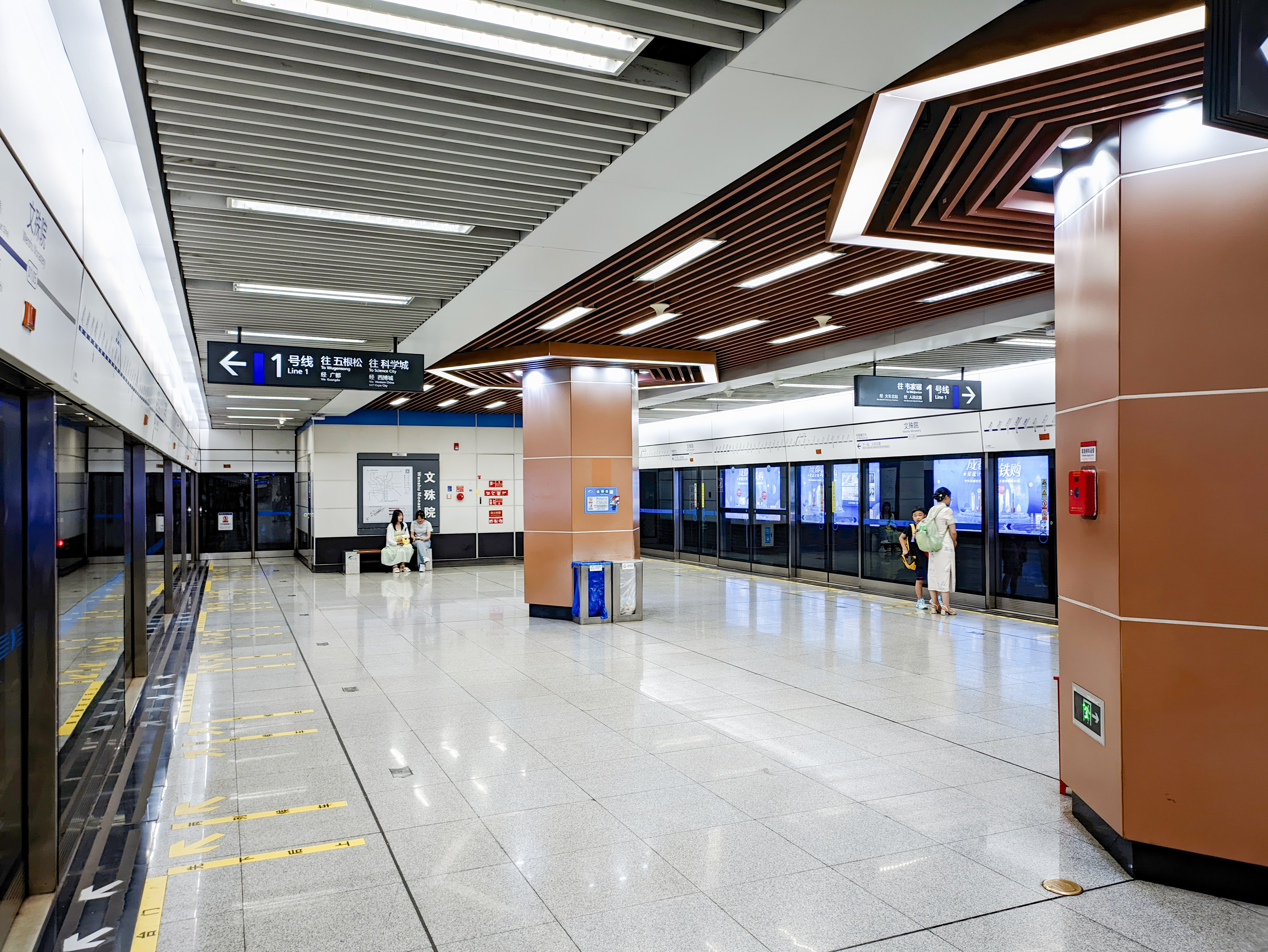
Platform
