= Luomashi station =

Metro station in Chengdu, China

Luomashi 骡马市
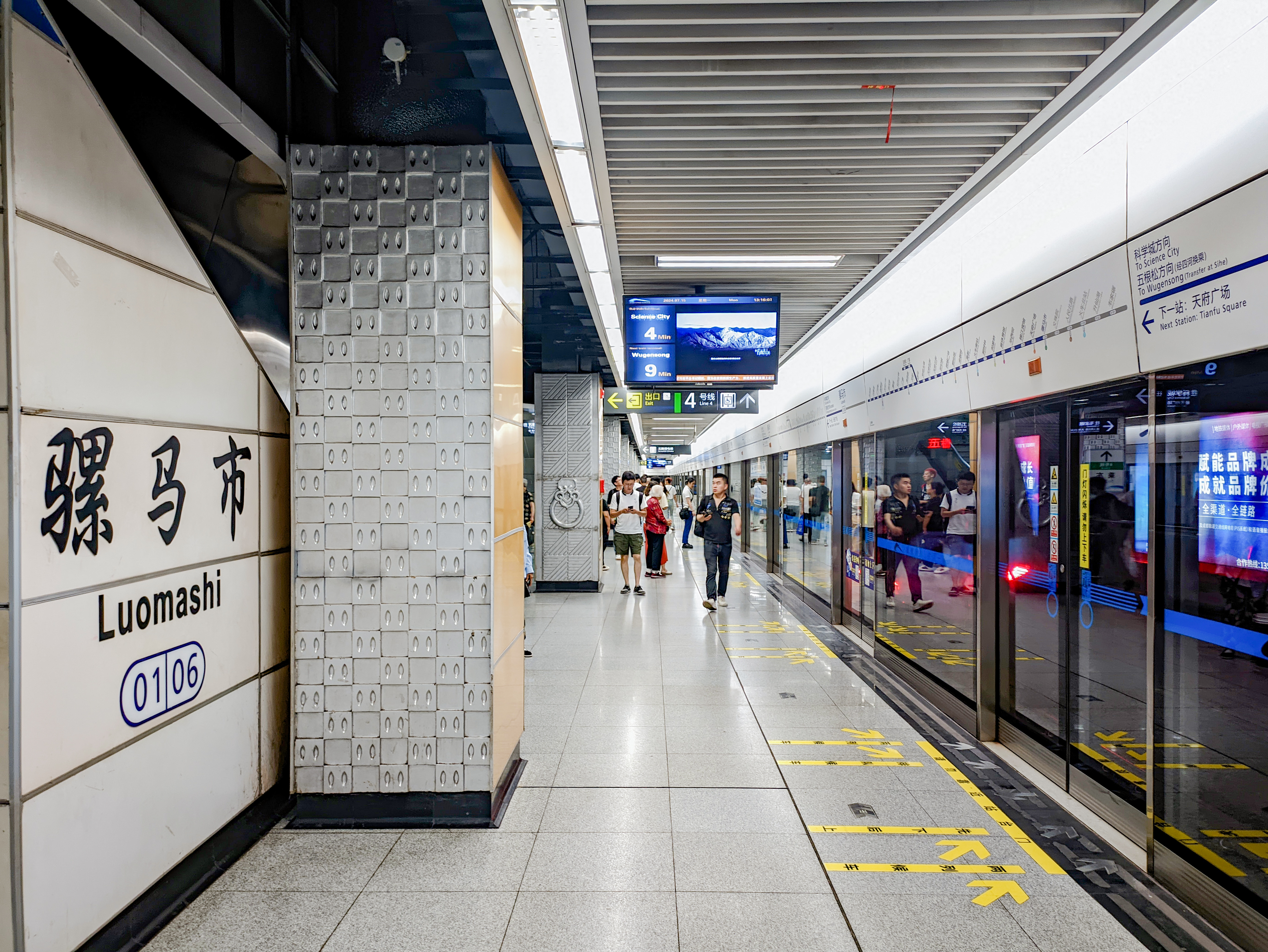
- Platform of Line 1

General information
- Location: Qingyang District, Chengdu, Sichuan; China
- Coordinates: 30.6685°N 104.0608°E
- Operator: Chengdu Metro Limited
- Lines: Line 1 Line 4
- Platforms: 4 (2 island platforms)

Other information
- Station code: 0106 0412

History
- Opened: 27 September 2010 (Line 1); 26 December 2015 (Line 4)

Services
Preceding station	Chengdu Metro	Following station
Wenshu Monastery towards Weijianian	Line 1	Tianfu Square towards Science City or Wugensong
Kuanzhaixiangzi Alleys towards Wansheng	Line 4	Taisheng South Road towards Xihe
Location

Luomashi (Chinese: 骡马市) is an interchange station on Line 1 and Line 4 of the Chengdu Metro in China.

== Station layout ==
G	Entrances and Exits	Exits A, D-G
B1	Concourse	Faregates, Station Agent
B2	Northbound	← Line 1 towards Weijianian (Wenshu Monastery)
B2	Island platform, doors open on the left
B2	Southbound	Line 1 towards Science City (Tianfu Square) →
B3	Westbound	← Line 4 to Wansheng (Kuanzhaixiangzi Alleys)
B3	Island platform, doors open on the left
B3	Eastbound	Line 4 to Xihe (Taisheng South Road) →

== Gallery ==
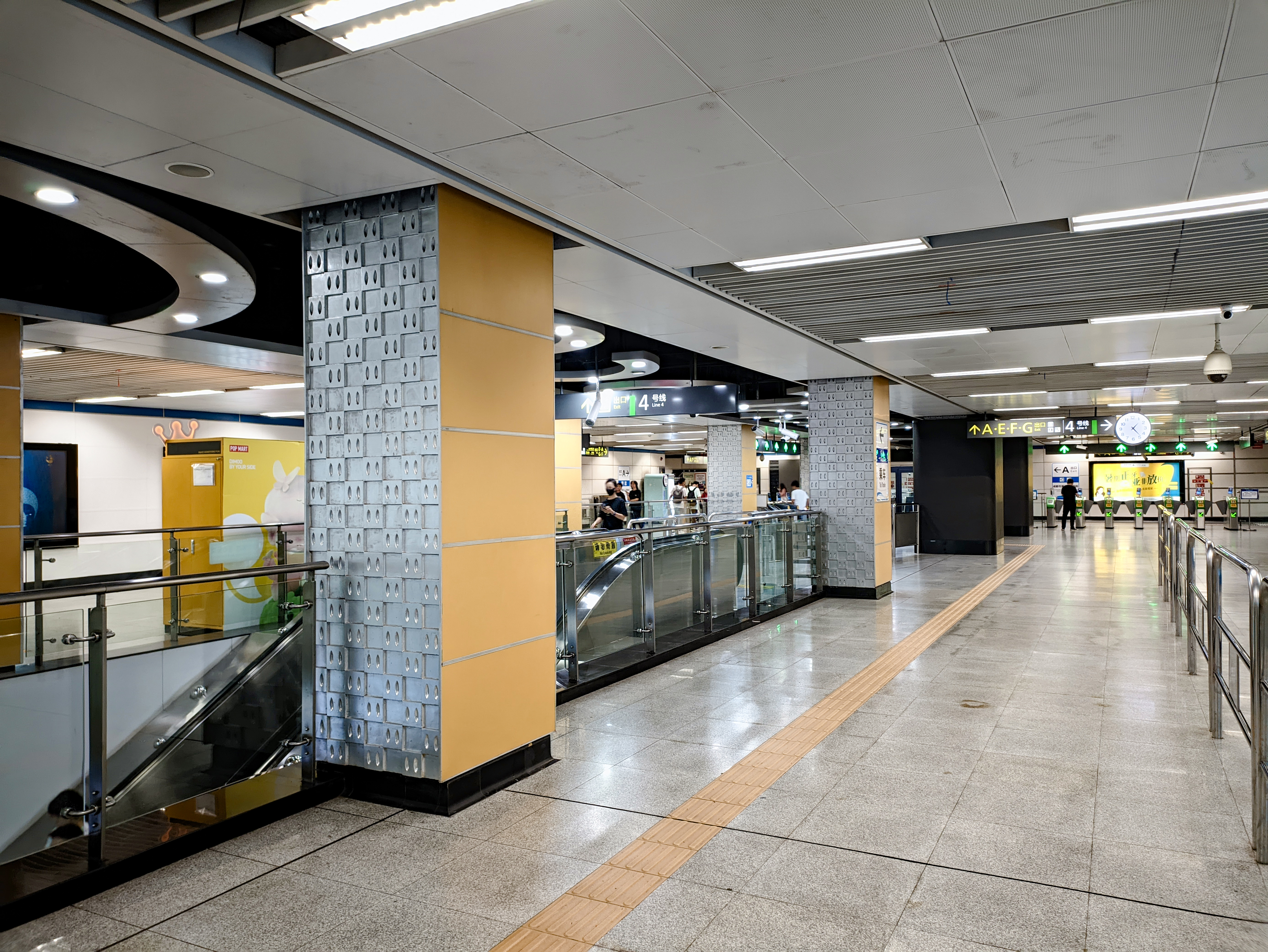
Concourse

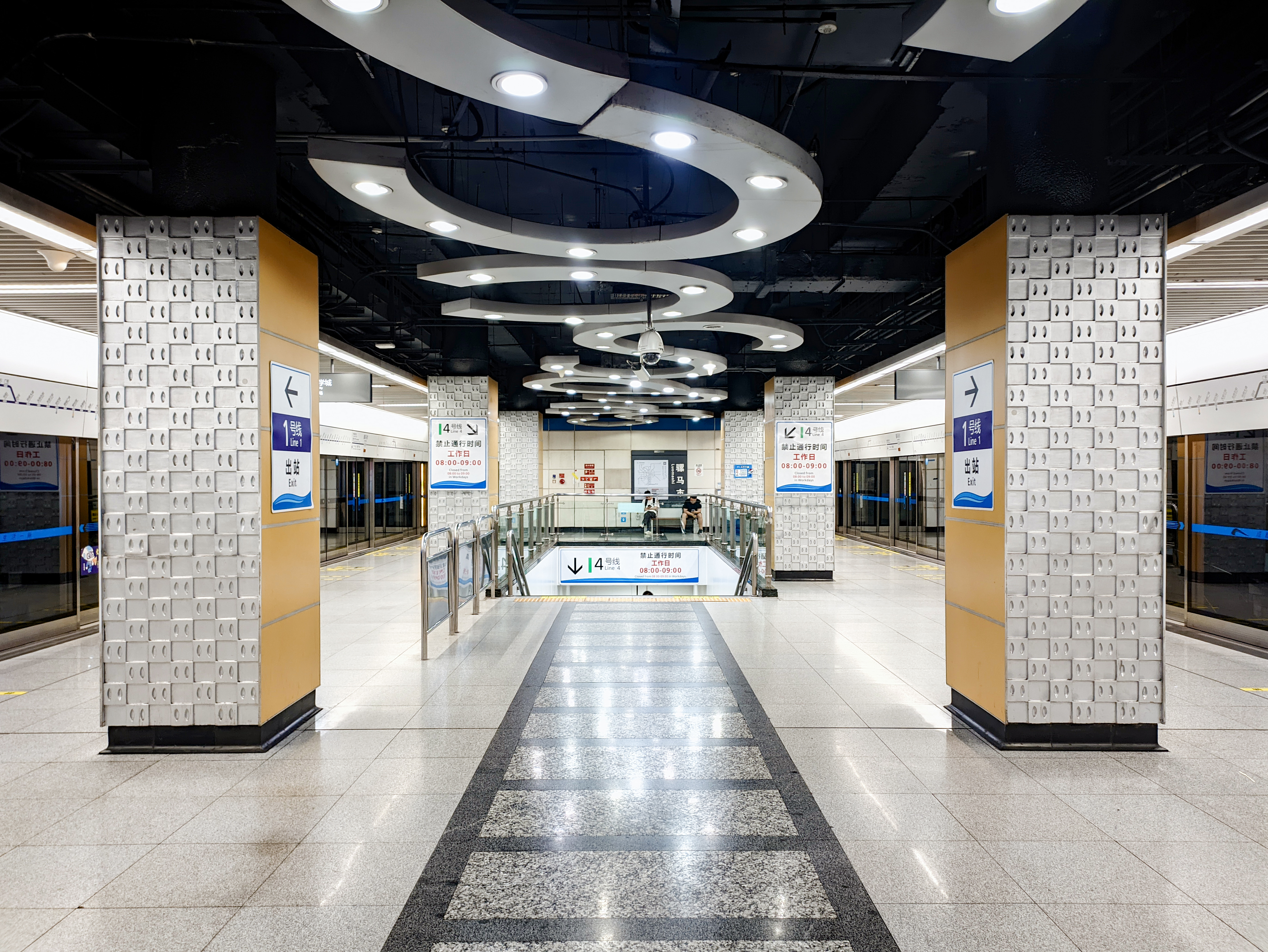
Platform of Line 1

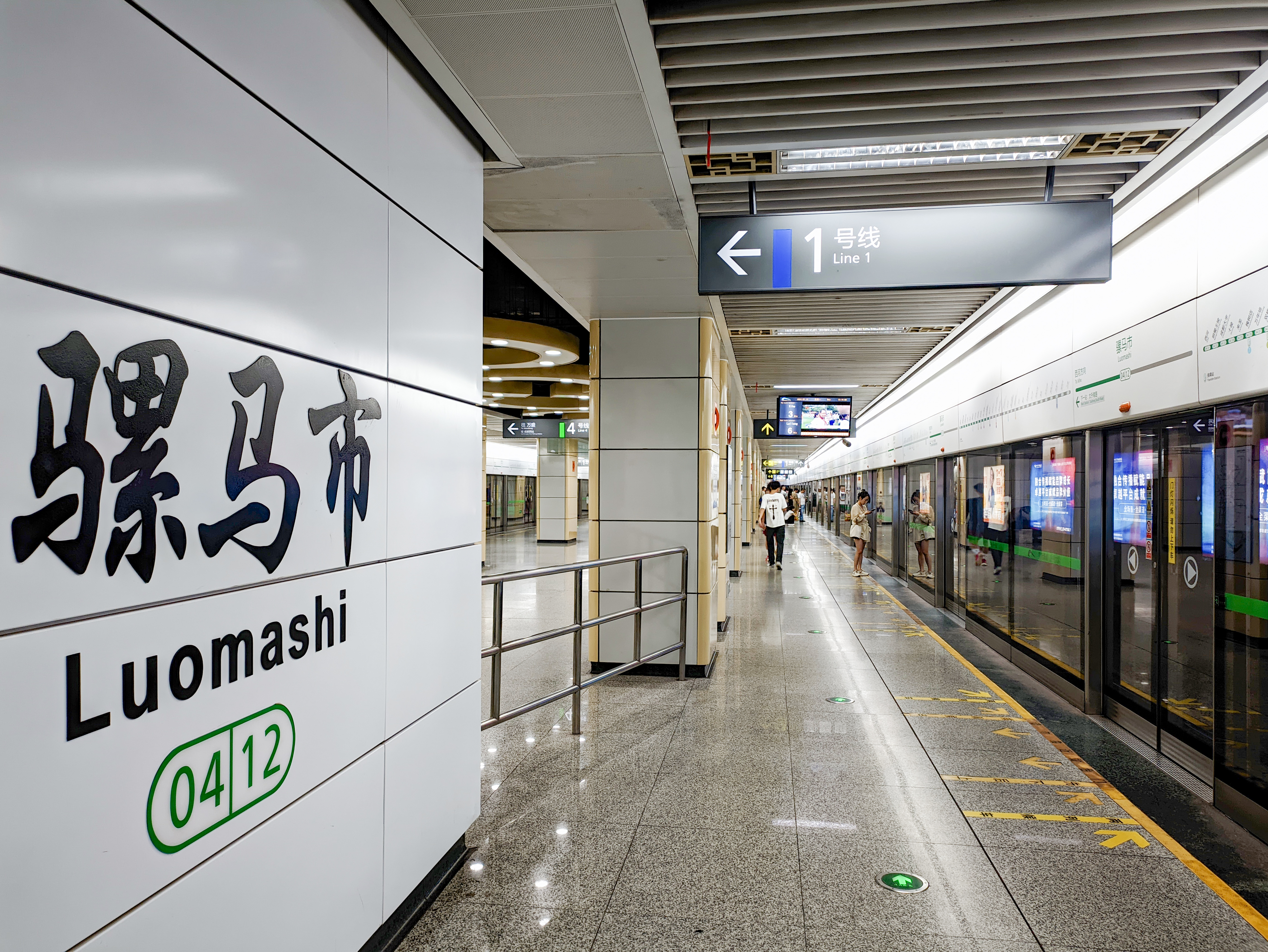
Platform of Line 4

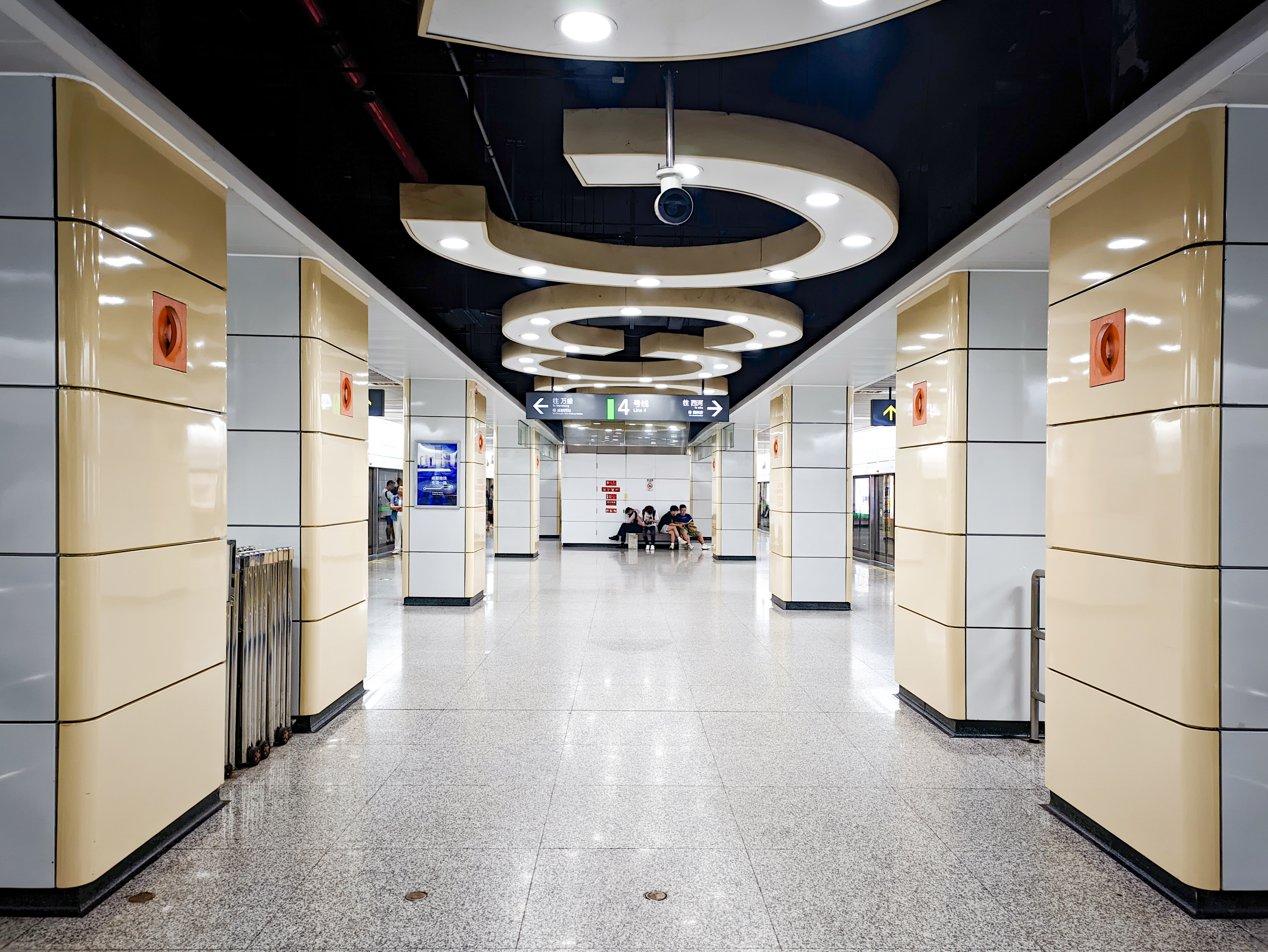
Platform of Line 4
