= Yinggui Lake =

Artificial lake in Chengdu, China

- 营桂湖
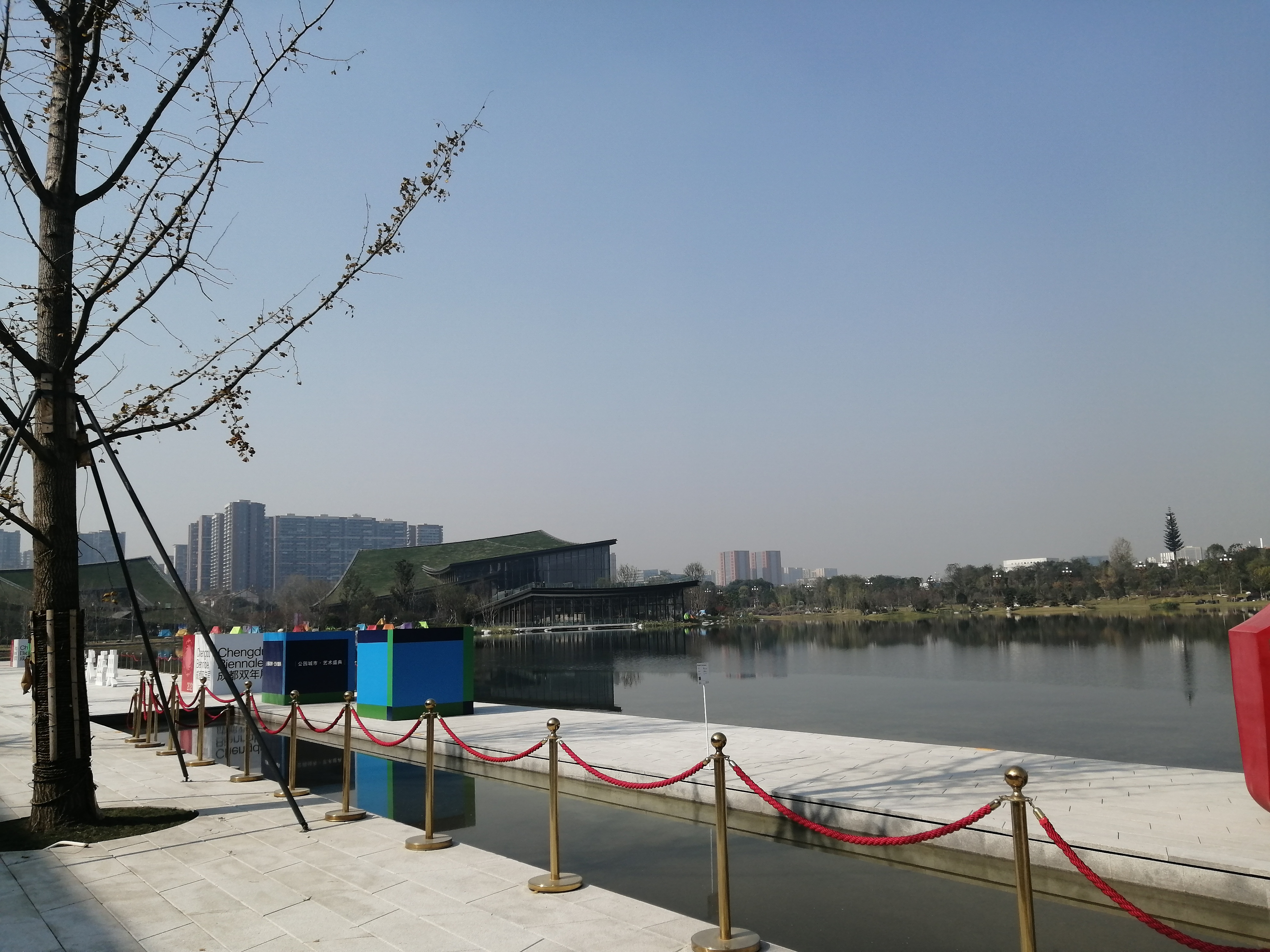
- A view of Yinggui Lake with the Chengdu Museum of Contemporary Art in the distance
- Interactive map of Yinggui Lake
- Type: Artificial lake
- Location: Tianfu Art Park, Jinniu District, Chengdu, Sichuan, China
- Coordinates: 30°42′47.83″N 104°01′10.97″E
- Area: 200 acres (81 ha)
- Opened: 2021
- Status: Public open space
- Facilities: Chengdu Tianfu Art Museum; Museum of Contemporary Art

Yinggui Lake (Chinese: 营桂湖) is an artificial lake in the Tianfu Art Park, surrounded by two art museums in the Jinniu District, northwest of central Chengdu, Sichuan, China.

== Overview ==
Yinggui Lake is the main lake in the Tianfu Art Park and covers more than 200 acres. There are three lakes in total, Fangfei Lake, Hehua Lake, and Yinggui Lake. The park itself covers an area of 3,033 acres, with scenic views.

The official launch of the Tianfu Art Park was held on 6 November 2021, with the opening of two new museum buildings by the lake, as a main focus of the 2021 Chengdu Biennale, and operated by the Chengdu Art Academy. The two museum buildings are the Chengdu Museum of Contemporary Art and Chengdu Tianfu Art Museum, forming a new part of the Chengdu Art Museum.

== See also ==
- Chengdu Museum of Contemporary Art
- Chengdu Tianfu Art Museum
- Tianfu Art Park
