= Chengdu Art Museum =

- 成都美术馆
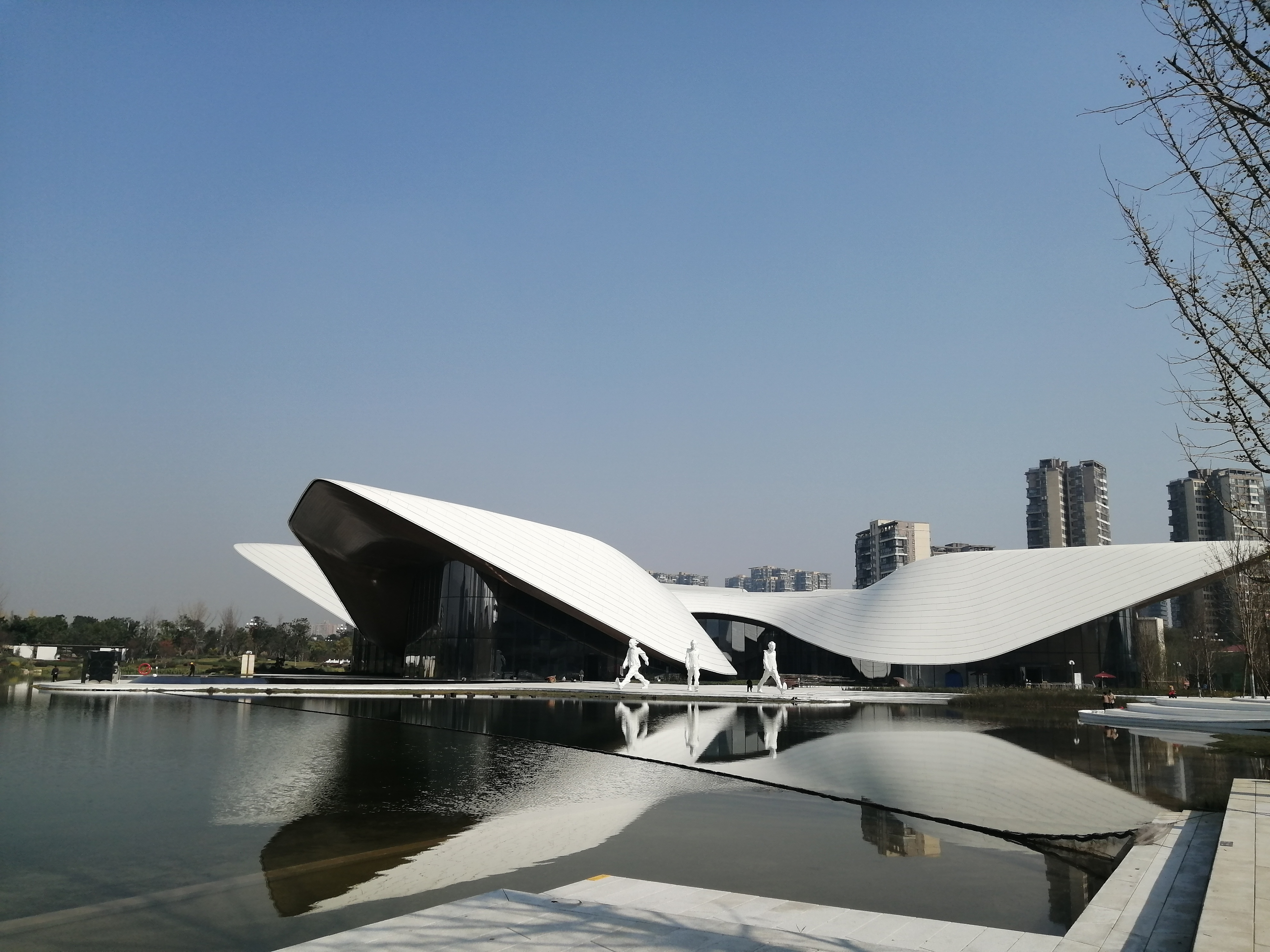
- View of the Chengdu Tianfu Art Museum building, part of the Chengda Art Museum from 2021
- Location: 59 Zhijishi Street; Tianfu Art Park (2021–); Chengdu, Sichuan, China
- Coordinates: 30.66537°N 104.05202°E
- Type: Art museum
- Founder: Chengdu Art Academy

The Chengdu Art Museum (Chinese: 成都美术馆) is an art museum with a collection of artworks, based in the city of Chengdu, Sichuan, China. It is run by the Chengdu Art Academy.

== History ==
The Chengdu Art Academy was founded in 1980 within the Chengdu Culture Park. In 1983, it moved to historic buildings at 59 Zhijishi Street. The style of the buildings is a typical quadrangle of western Sichuan historic houses dating from the late Qing dynasty. In 2007, the premises were approved as a Sichuan Provincial Heritage Conservation Site. A project to protect and maintain the buildings was completed in 2008. The buildings were opened by the academy as the Chengdu Art Museum. During October to December 2020, the historic museum buildings were closed to the public for maintenance.

On 6 November 2021, at the Tianfu Art Park and at the start of the 2021 Chengdu Biennale, the Chengdu Art Academy launched two new contemporary art museum buildings in the park, namely the Chengdu Tianfu Art Museum and the Chengdu Museum of Contemporary Art, forming a new focus for the Chengdu Art Museum.

== See also ==
- Chengdu Art Academy
- Chengdu Museum of Contemporary Art
- Chengdu Tianfu Art Museum
- Tianfu Art Park
