= Lü Peng =

Lü Peng is the name of:

- Lü Peng (critic) (born 1956), Chinese curator and art historian
- Lü Peng (footballer) (born 1989), Chinese footballer
