= Chengdu Biennale =

Chinese contemporary art festival

Chengdu Biennale 成都双年展
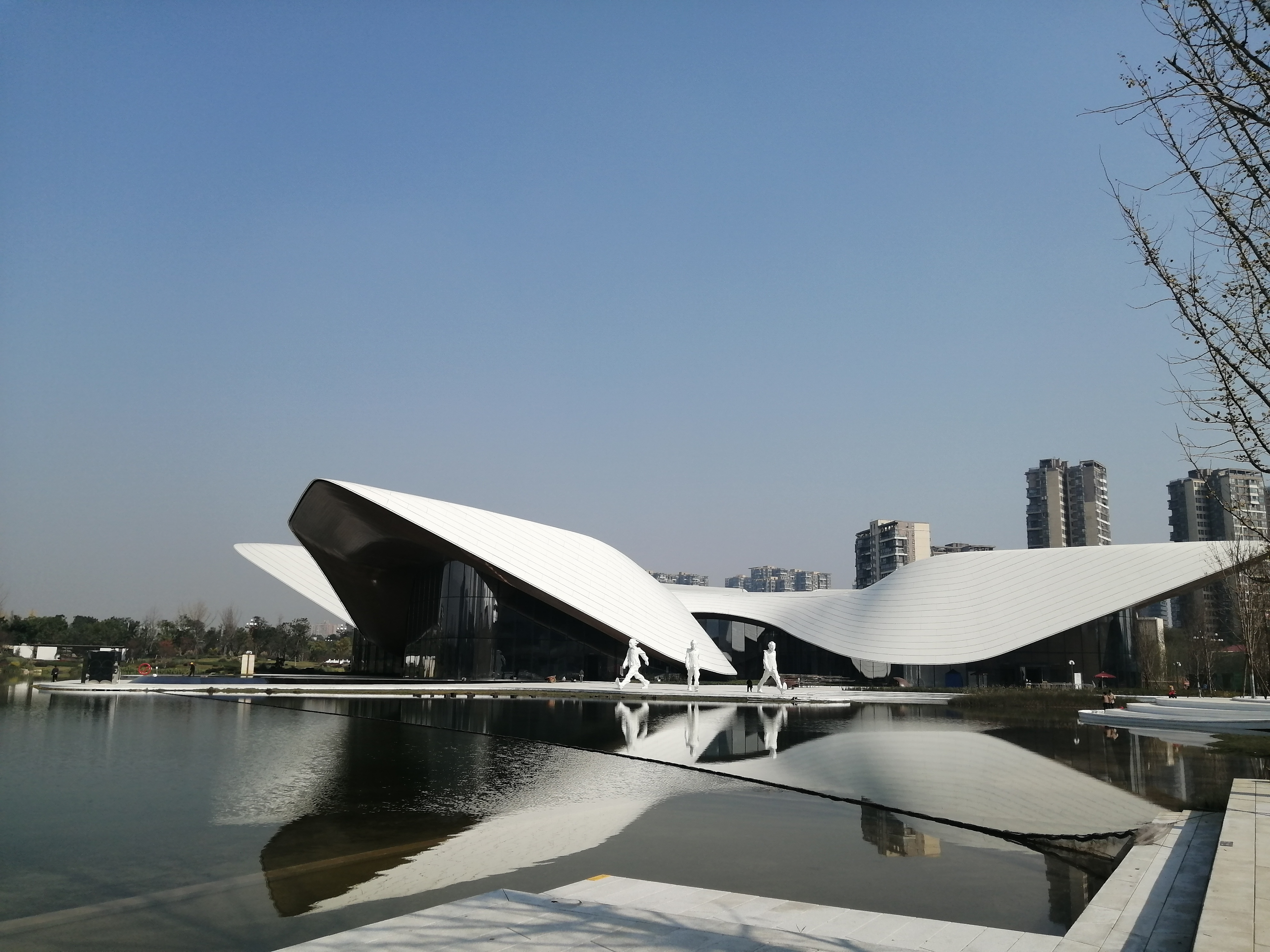
- The Chengdu Tianfu Art Museum, part of the 2021 Chengdu Biennale, looking across Yinggui Lake in the Tianfu Art Park
- Genre: Biennale; focuses on contemporary art
- Frequency: Biennial, every two years
- Locations: Tianfu Art Park, Jinniu District, Chengdu, Sichuan, China
- Coordinates: 30.71422°N 104.01589°E
- Years active: 20
- Inaugurated: 2001
- Founder: Deng Hong
- Most recent: 2021
- Previous event: 2013
- Participants: 270 Chinese and international artists
- Organiser: Chengdu Art Academy
- People: Lü Peng (2011 chief curator)
- Website: www.chengdubiennale.art

The Chengdu Biennale (Chinese: 成都双年展) is a contemporary art biennale event in Chengdu, China, started in 2001.

== Overview ==
The entrepreneur Deng Hong funded the first four biennales (from 2001). From the fifth event (2011 onwards), the biennale has been co-hosted by local official cultural institutions in Chengdu. After the sixth biennale in 2013, there was an interval of the official event until 2021. During this period, another art event took place, known as the Anren Biennale, mainly privately funded and operated, starting in 2017.

The 2021 Chengdu Biennale started on 6 November 2021, running until 6 April 2022. The official launch of the Tianfu Art Park in the Jinniu District of Chengdu was held on 6 November 2021, with the opening of two new museum buildings in the park, operated by the Chengdu Art Academy. The Chengdu Art Museum surrounds a lake with two new museum buildings, the Chengdu Tianfu Art Museum and the Chengdu Museum of Contemporary Art. Artworks by more than 270 Chinese and international artists from 35 countries are on display at the biennale.{ The theme of the 2021 biennale is "Super Fusion". Chinese artists exhibiting at the 2021 biennale include He Duoling, Liu Jiakun, Xu Bing, Zeng Fanzhi, Zhang Xiaogang, and Zhou Chunya. International artists include Daniel Buren, Yoan Capote, Leandro Erlich, Carsten Höller, Anish Kapoor, and Jeremy Gardiner.

== Exhibitions ==
The following Chengdu Biennales (from 2001) and Anren Biennales (from 2017) have taken place:

1. In 2001, the 1st Biennale "Yangban Model Art in China" invited 120 artists to participate, mainly paintings on the easel.
2. In 2005, the 2nd Biennale "Spectacle Century and Paradise" was internationalized, inviting six foreign artists to participate. It was held in the New International Convention Center, Chengdu Century City.
3. In 2007, the 3rd Chengdu Biennale "Reboot" was held. Its curatorial team included the domestic curators Feng Bin and Lu Hong, cooperating with Britta Erickson and Kuiyi Shen from the United States.
4. In 2009, the 4th Chengdu Biennale had "China Narratives" as the theme, with Jia Fangzhou and Zou Yuejin as curators, 120 participating artists, 271 works involving oil painting, ink painting, photography, video, sculpture, and installations. This exhibition was divided into five subthemes: "2008", "History", "Reality", "Urban", and "Rural".
5. In 2011, the 5th Chengdu Biennale invited Lü Peng as the chief curator, named "Changing Vistas: Creative Duration", including contemporary art, design, and architecture. Two hundred artists from China and abroad participate in this exhibition. This time, the event learned lessons from the model of the Venice Biennale, with one main exhibition and other special exhibitions held at 16 local art museums, which successfully attracted approximately 280,000 visitors. The right to operate the Chengdu Biennale was taken over by the Government.
6. In 2013, the 6th Chengdu Biennale invited Feng Bin and Zhao Li as curators, consisting of two parts: "Relation" and "Young Artists of Ten Years".
7. The event was not held as scheduled in 2015.
8. In 2017, the 1st Anren Biennale, "Today's Yesterday", hosted by a private organization in Chengdu, invited 189 artists from 18 countries and regions and more than 800 works.
9. In 2019, the 2nd Anren Biennale, "A Confrontation of Ideals", was jointly curated by Lü Peng, He Guiyan, and the Dutch curator Siebe Tettero.
10. In 2021, the 3rd Anren Biennale invited Gu Yuan as the director, cooperating with the art critics/curators Wang Lin, Zhao Li, Xia Kejun, Gu Yuan, Elsa Wang, Li Xiaofeng, Wen Ya, etc. They separated the areas to become the curator of each subtheme, inviting 150 contemporary artists and exhibiting more than 300 works. In the same year, the 2021 Chengdu Biennale was held in Chengdu Tianfu Art Museum and Chengdu Museum of Contemporary Art, and 272 artists were invited to participate, and 17 special invited exhibitions were exhibited in several local art galleries in Chengdu at the same time. For example, the special invited exhibition "Still on" was held in the Usunhome Art Museum.
11. In 2025, the Chengdu Biennale will return under the theme "Fireworks Index", which focuses on the living conditions of people across different time zones, and examines daily life within a complex and changing social environment. The curatorial team for the 2025 edition includes prominent figures from both China and abroad: Fan Di'an, Lu Peng, Jay Xu, Wang Shaoqiang, Wu Hongliang, He Guiyan, Guillaume de Sardes, Martin Rendel, and Xiao Feige.
