= Zeng Hao =

Chinese contemporary artist (b. 1963)

Zeng Hao (born 1963) is a Chinese contemporary artist.

Zeng currently works in Beijing.

== Life ==
Zeng Hao (曾浩) was born in Kunming in 1963. He graduated from the Central Academy of Fine Arts in 1989.

Famous for his critique of consumerism, Zeng once said that "Man is endlessly creating materials, but in the end he will be chained down by these objects, who is serving who?". In another interview, Zeng said "As I get older, I find that people are too insignificant, just like ants. You can be tossed around in any way you want... I think people have nothing personal at all, they are all shaped, like 'industrial products.'"

As a representative of the "New Figurative" style of painting, Zeng was originally dismissed as a teacher at the Guangzhou Academy of Fine Arts due to his unconventional painting style. Nonetheless, Zeng subsequently became recognized for his "balloon series" in the early 90s, and then for his irregular portraitures of people - which then evolved into his series of paintings of "little people" (large paintings with small disproportionately-sized drawings of furniture and people scattered around the canvas) in the mid 90s up until the late 2000s. In the 2010s, Zeng progressed to installation art. Throughout the years, disproportionately-sized people and furniture in large negative spaces are a constant theme in his work; many of the works also feature a specific time and date in their titles.

Zeng's paintings and works has been exhibited at various museums and exhibitions around the world, including the Staatliche Kunstsammlungen Dresden (2001), the Museum Ludwig (2002), the Shanghai Gallery of Art (2004, 2006), the Guangdong Museum of Art (2007), the Singapore Art Museum (2008), the National Museum of Modern and Contemporary Art in Korea (2010), the Hunan Museum (2009), the Hubei Provincial Museum (2009), the Minsheng Museum (2012, 2015), the, Chengdu Biennale (2011), the Sao Paulo Biennial (2002), The Triennial of Chinese Arts (2002), the Prague Biennale (2005), the Shanghai Biennale (2008) and the Venice Biennale (2009).
