= Tianfu Art Park =

Park in Chengdu, China

- 天府艺术公园
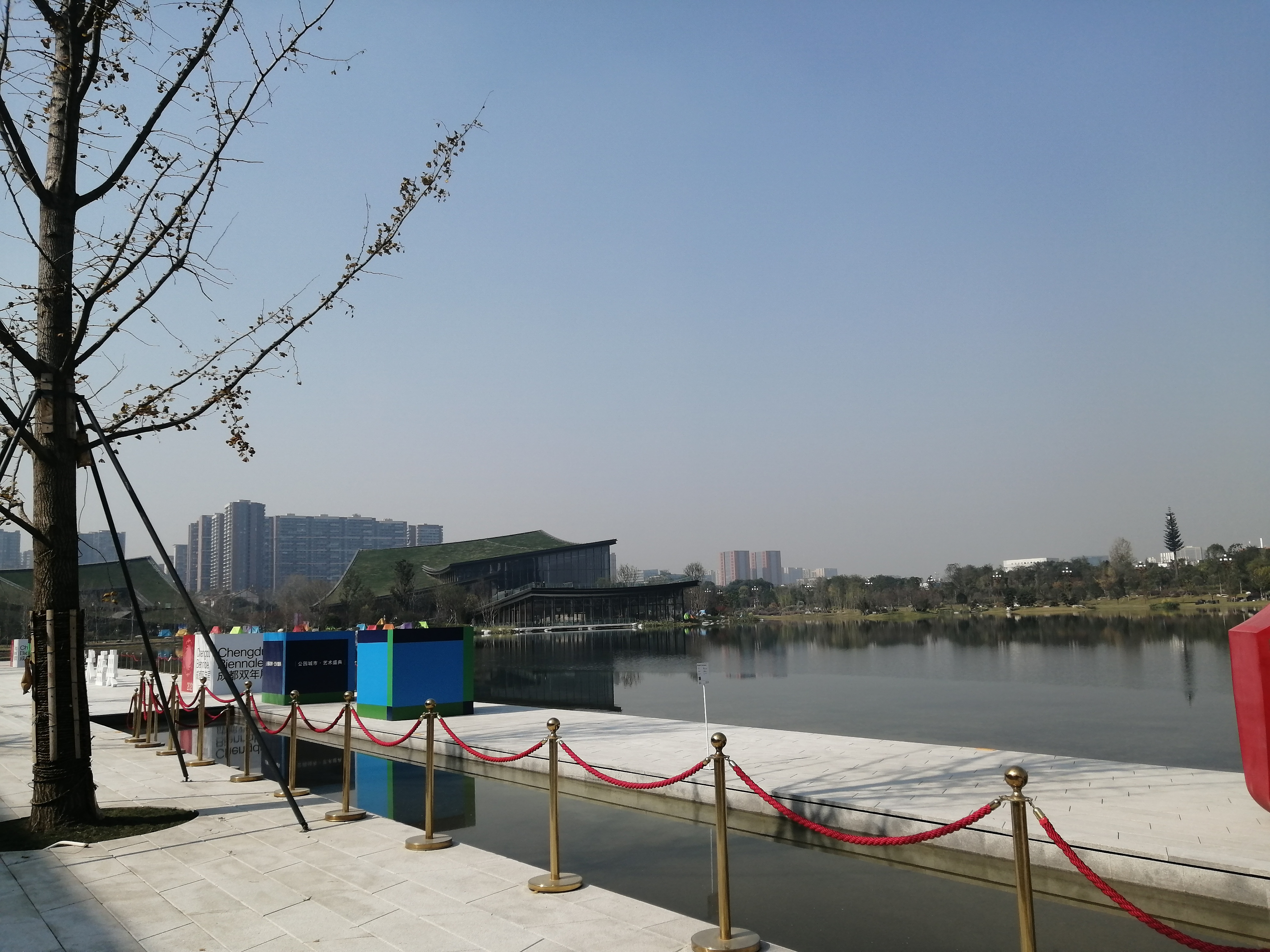
- Yinggui Lake in the park
- Interactive map of Tianfu Art Park
- Location: Jinniu District, Chengdu, Sichuan, China
- Coordinates: 30°42′47.83″N 104°01′10.97″E
- Area: 3,033 acres (1,227 ha)
- Opened: 6 November 2021
- Status: Public
- Designation: Urban park
- Facilities: Chengdu Tianfu Art Museum; Museum of Contemporary Art; Tianfu Humanities & Art Library; Fangfei Lake; Hehua Lake; Yinggui Lake

The Tianfu Art Park (Chinese: 天府艺术公园) is an urban park with two art museums in the Jinniu District, northwest of central Chengdu, Sichuan, China.

== Overview ==
The official launch of the Tianfu Art Park was held on 6 November 2021, with the opening of two new museum buildings in the park, operated by the Chengdu Art Academy. The Chengdu Art Museum surrounds a lake in the park with two new museum buildings, the Chengdu Tianfu Art Museum and the Chengdu Museum of Contemporary Art.

The park covers an area of 3,033 acres, with scenic views. Yinggui Lake, the main lake in the park, covers more than 200 acres. There are three lakes in total, Fangfei Lake, Hehua Lake, and Yinggui Lake. As well as the two museums, the park also includes the Tianfu Humanities and Art Library. In addition, there are art-related businesses in the surrounding area.

The Chengdu Biennale, a contemporary art biennale event started in 2001, was held in the two new museum buildings in the park in 2021.

== See also ==
- Chengdu Culture Park
