= Chengdu Art Academy =

Art academy in Chengdu, China

- 成都画院
- Formation: 1980
- Founded at: Chengdu, Sichuan, China
- Type: Nonprofit
- Legal status: Governmental organization
- Purpose: Supporting art in Chengdu
- Headquarters: Culture Park (1980–1983); 59 Zhijishi Street (1983–2021); Tianfu Art Park (2021–)
- Location: Chengdu, China
- Region served: Chengdu
- Services: Arts organization; Chengdu Art Museum
- Official language: Chinese
- Website: weibo.com/zhijishi

The Chengdu Art Academy (Chinese: 成都画院) is an arts organization, supporting contemporary art and the Chengdu Art Museum with a collection of artworks, based in the city of Chengdu, Sichuan, China.

== Overview ==
The academy is organized by the Chinese government. It recruits mature professional artists and most receive a salary for producing their work, but it does not operate as an art school with students such as the Chengdu Academy of Fine Arts.

== History ==
The Chengdu Art Academy was founded in 1980, as the first Chinese professional art organization established by the Chinese government. Its remit includes painting and calligraphy creation, research into art theory, and academic communication. Originally the Chengdu Art Academy was located in the Culture Park. In 1983, it was moved to 59 Zhijishi Street. The style of the buildings is a typical quadrangle of western Sichuan historic houses dating from the late Qing dynasty. In 2007, the premises were approved as a Sichuan Provincial Heritage Conservation Site. A project to protect and maintain the buildings was completed in 2008. The buildings were opened by the academy as the Chengdu Art Museum (Chinese: 成都市美术馆). During October to December 2020, the Academy/Museum buildings were closed to the public for maintenance.

On 6 November 2021, at the Tianfu Art Park and at the start of the 2021 Chengdu Biennale, the Chengdu Art Academy launched two new contemporary art museum buildings in the park, namely the Chengdu Tianfu Art Museum and the Chengdu Museum of Contemporary Art, forming a new focus for the Chengdu Art Museum. As a result, the academy is now based at the park.

== See also ==
- Chengdu Academy of Fine Arts
- Sichuan Conservatory of Music, Chengdu
- Sichuan Fine Arts Institute, Chongqing
