= Jinniu, Chengdu =

Urban district of Chengdu, Sichuan, China

Jinniu 金牛区
- District
- District of Jinniu, City of Chengdu
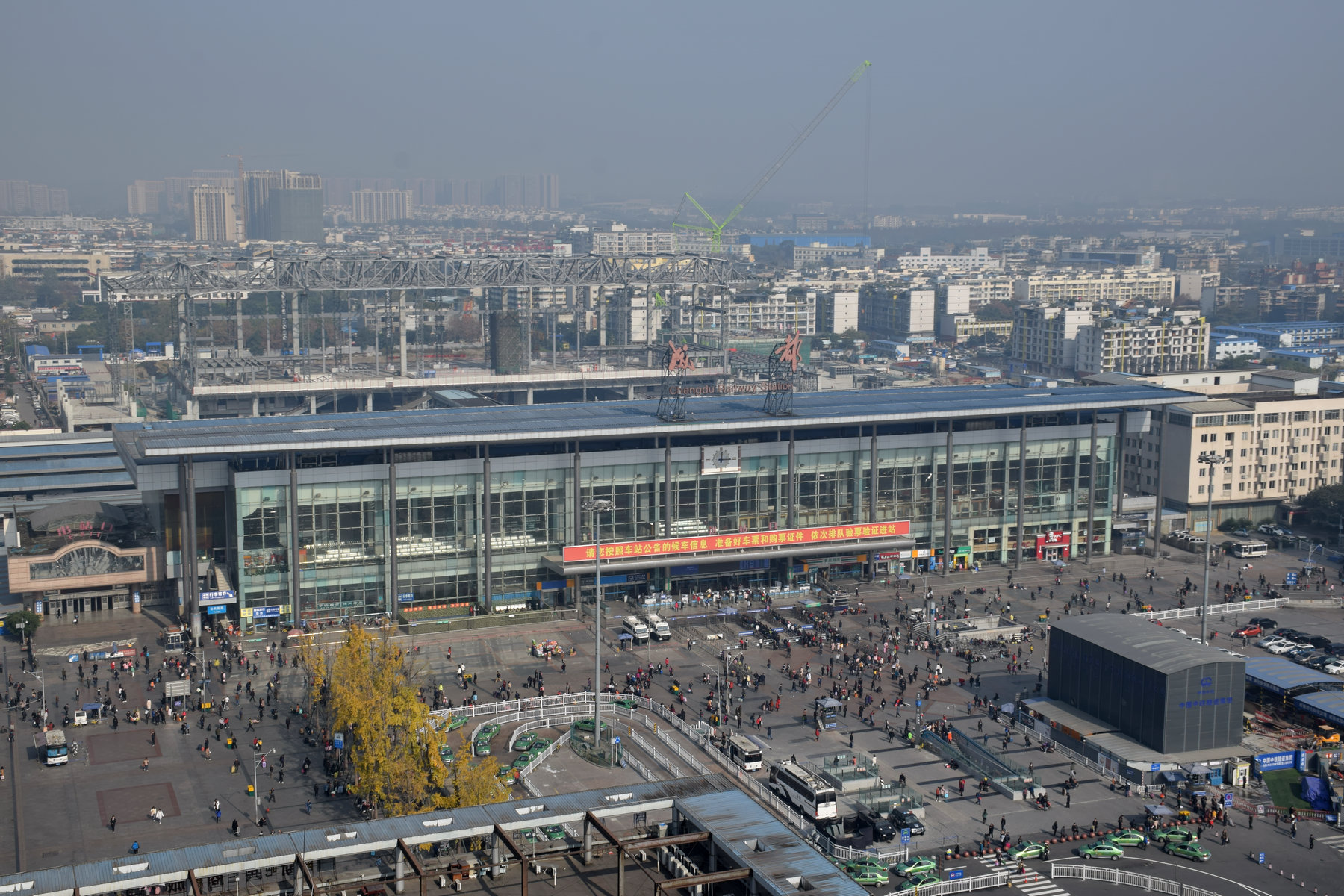
- Chengdu Railway Station South Square

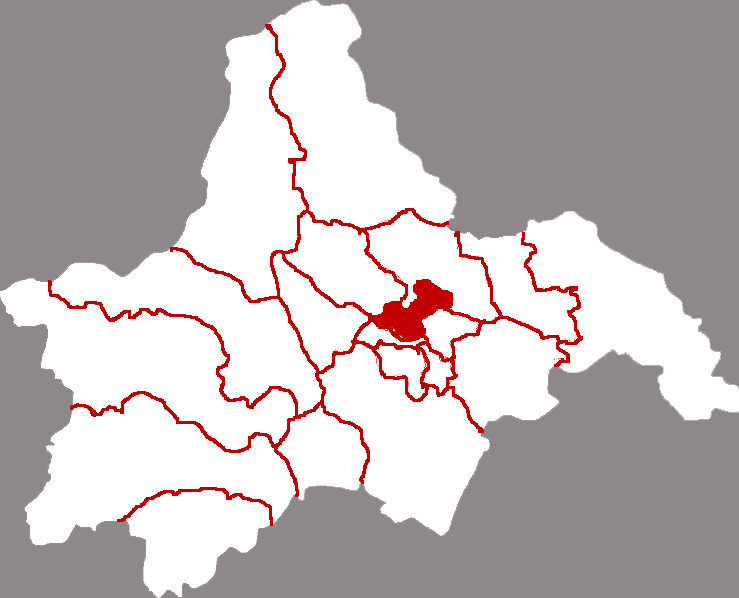
- Location of Jinniu in Chengdu

- Location in Sichuan Jinniu (China)
- Coordinates: 30°44′06″N 104°02′48″E
- Country: China
- Province: Sichuan
- Sub-provincial city: Chengdu
- District seat: Fuqin Subdistrict

Area
  - Total: 108 km^{2} (42 sq mi)

Population (2020)
  - Total: 1,265,398
  - Density: 11,700/km^{2} (30,300/sq mi)
- Time zone: UTC+8 (China Standard)
- Website: www.jinniu.gov.cn

Jinniu District (Chinese: 金牛区; pinyin: Jīnniú Qū; lit. 'gold bull district') is a central urban district of the City of Chengdu, the capital of Sichuan, China.

Jinniu District is bordered by Chenghua District to the east, Qingyang District to the southwest, Pidu District to the northwest, and Xindu District to the north.

== Administrative divisions ==
Jinniu District administers 13 subdistricts:

- Xi'anlu Subdistrict (西安路街道)
- Xihua Subdistrict (西华街道)
- Hehuachi Subdistrict (荷花池街道)
- Simaqiao Subdistrict (驷马桥街道)
- Chadianzi Subdistrict (茶店子街道)
- Fuqin Subdistrict (抚琴街道)
- Jiulidi Subdistrict (九里堤街道)
- Wukuaishi Subdistrict (五块石街道)
- Yingmenkou Subdistrict (营门口街道)
- Jinquan Subdistrict (金泉街道)
- Shaheyuan Subdistrict (沙河源街道)
- Tianhuizhen Subdistrict (天回镇街道)
- Fenghuangshan Subdistrict (凤凰山街道)

== Tourist attractions ==
Tourist attractions in Jinniu District include:

- Chengdu Museum of Contemporary Art
- Chengdu Tianfu Art Museum
- Phoenix Mountain Mosque
- Tianfu Art Park (see also Yinggui Lake)

Many of these cultural attractions were established as part of the 2021 Chengdu Biennale.

== Transportation ==
Jinniu District has developed a road network consisting of six major north–south arteries and six east–west routes. The north–south arteries include Shuhan Road (Yangxi Line), Jinniu Avenue (Chengguan Road), Shangmao Avenue, Shaxi Line, Chengpeng Road, and Chuanshan Road; the east–west routes include the Inner Ring Road, First Ring Road, Second Ring Road, Middle Ring Road, Third Ring Road, and the Chengdu Ring Expressway. The district is also home to Chengdu Railway Station, a major hub connecting the Chengdu–Chongqing, Baoji–Chengdu, Chengdu–Kunming, and Chengdu–Dazhou railways, as well as Chadianzi and Beimen Coach Stations, which serve as important gateways for highway transport to western and northern Sichuan.
