= Portland Gallery =

Art gallery in London

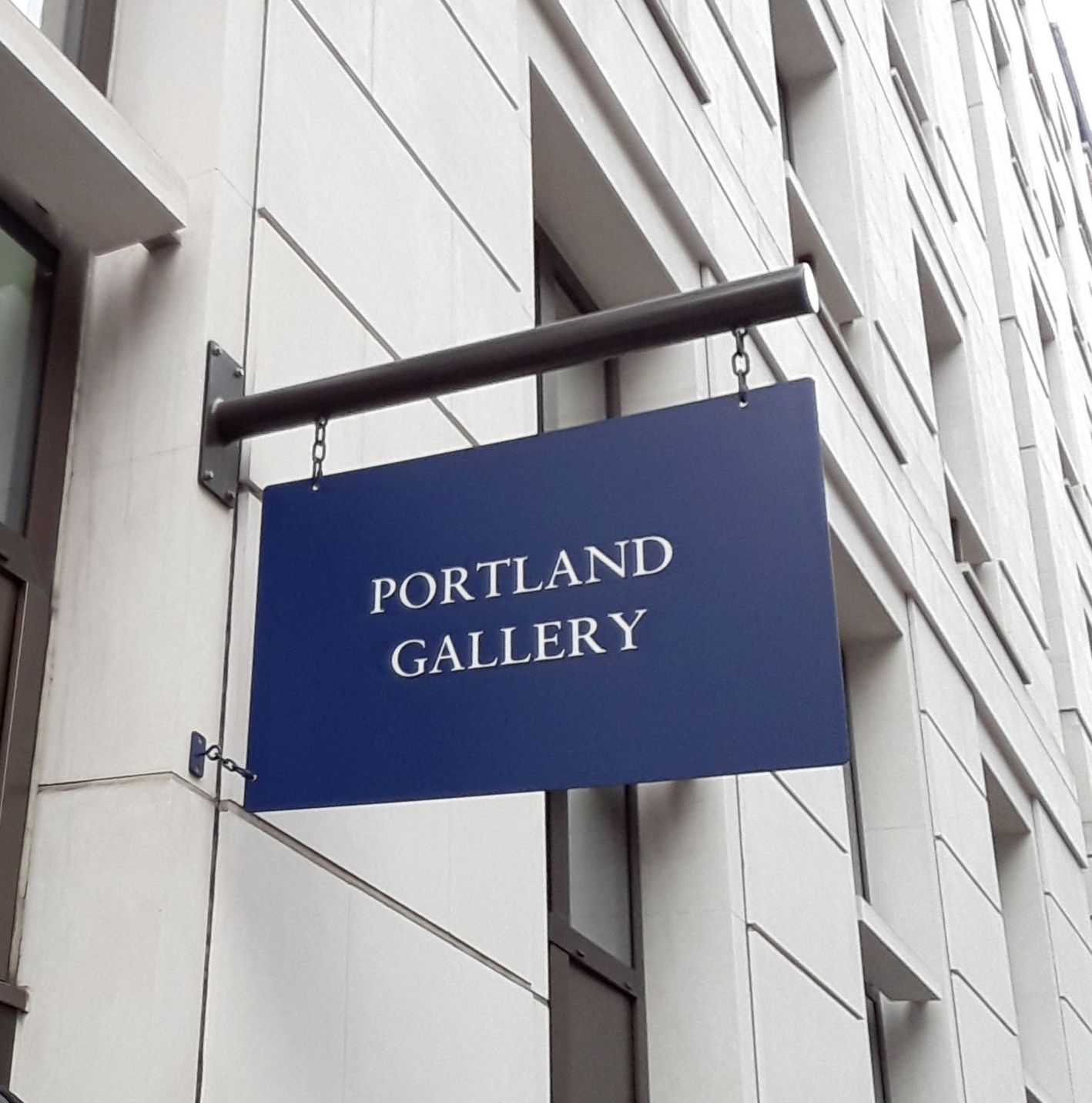
- Gallery sign in Bennet Street

- Location within central London
- Established: 1986
- Location: 3 Bennet Street, St James's, London SW1A 1RP, UK
- Coordinates: 51.507138°N 0.140107°W
- Type: Art gallery
- Collections: 20th and 21st century British art
- Website: portlandgallery.com

Portland Gallery is an art gallery in central London, England.

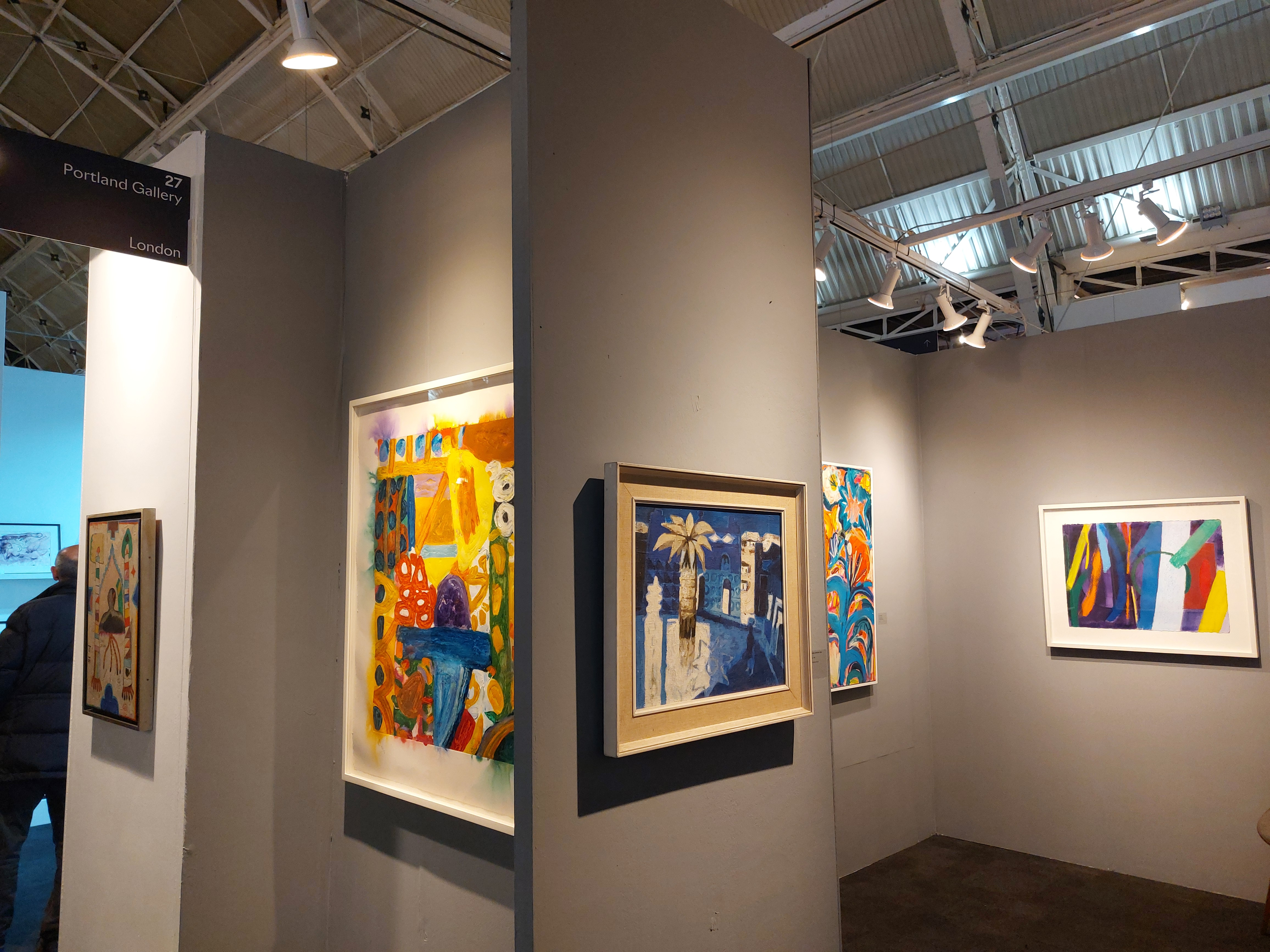
Gallery stand at the 2024 London Art Fair

Founded in 1986 by Tom Hewlett, Portland Gallery is one of London's commercial art galleries dealing in modern British and contemporary paintings. Following Hewlett's retirement in 2022, the gallery has since been run by Jamie Anderson, who continues to maintain and develop a programme of exhibitions and events at the gallery. The gallery supports its artists and estates by participating at art fairs, including the London Art Fair., the Masterpiece Fair, and the British Art Fair, where the gallery has presented works from its inventory of modern British art. The gallery has a particular association with the Scottish Colourist artists.

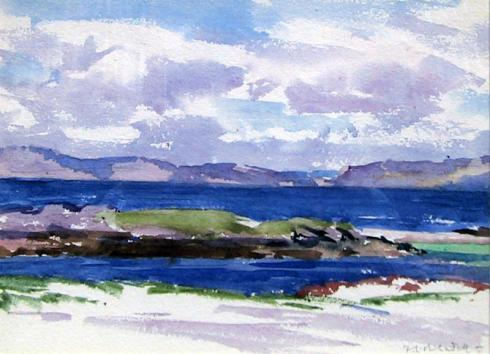
Iona by Francis Cadell (1883–1937), exhibited at the Portland Gallery

The gallery is located at 3 Bennet Street in St James's, central London, on the corner with St James's Street, and close to The Ritz Hotel. It is open from Monday to Friday (10am–6pm) or by appointment. Portland Gallery runs around 14 exhibitions a year. The gallery's exhibitions have included artists such as Francis Cadell, Jeremy Gardiner, Martin Greenland, John Piper, and Tom Wood.

The gallery is a member of The Society of London Art Dealers.
