= Jeremy Gardiner =

British landscape painter

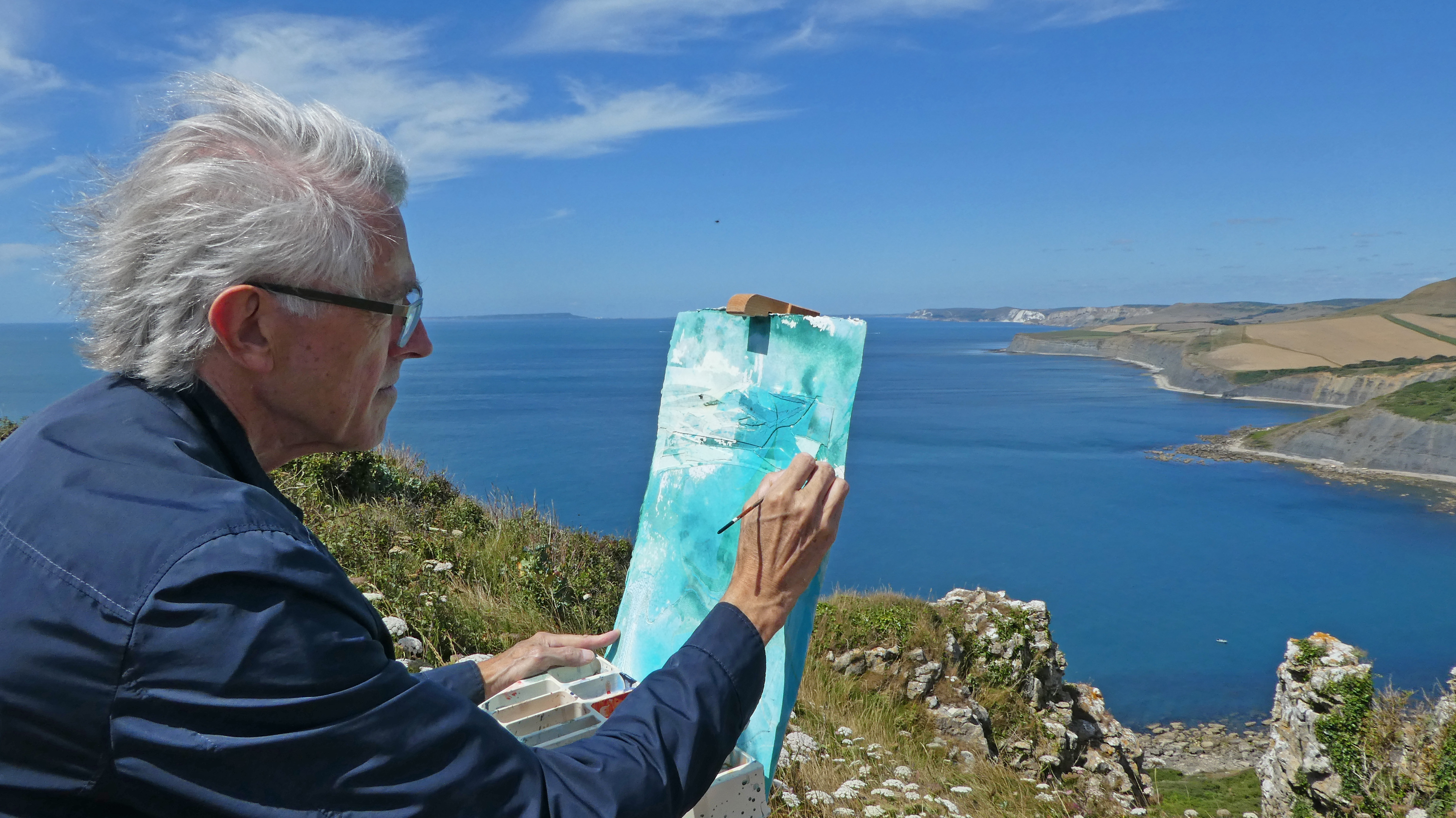
- Jeremy Gardiner painting on the Dorset coast
- Born: Jeremy Gardiner; 26 April 1957 (age 69); Münster, West Germany
- Education: Newcastle University, Royal College of Art
- Known for: Landscape painting
- Notable work: Pendeen Lighthouse
- Movement: Modern landscape
- Spouse: Veronica Falcão
- Awards: The Discerning Eye ING Art Prize (2013)
- Website: www.jeremygardiner.co.uk

Jeremy Gardiner (born 26 April 1957) is a contemporary landscape painter who has been based in the United Kingdom and the United States. His work has been featured in books. It has also been reviewed in The Boston Globe, Miami Herald, The New York Times, and British newspapers including The Guardian and The Observer. He is represented by the Portland Gallery in London.

== Early life and education ==
Jeremy Gardiner was born in Münster, Germany. He was educated at Newcastle University, UK (BA Hons in Fine Art, 1975–79) and the Royal College of Art in London (MA in Painting, 1980–83), where he was awarded a John Minton Scholarship.

== Work themes ==
Old Harry Rocks, 2022 acrylic and mixed media painting on a poplar panel (120×90cm)

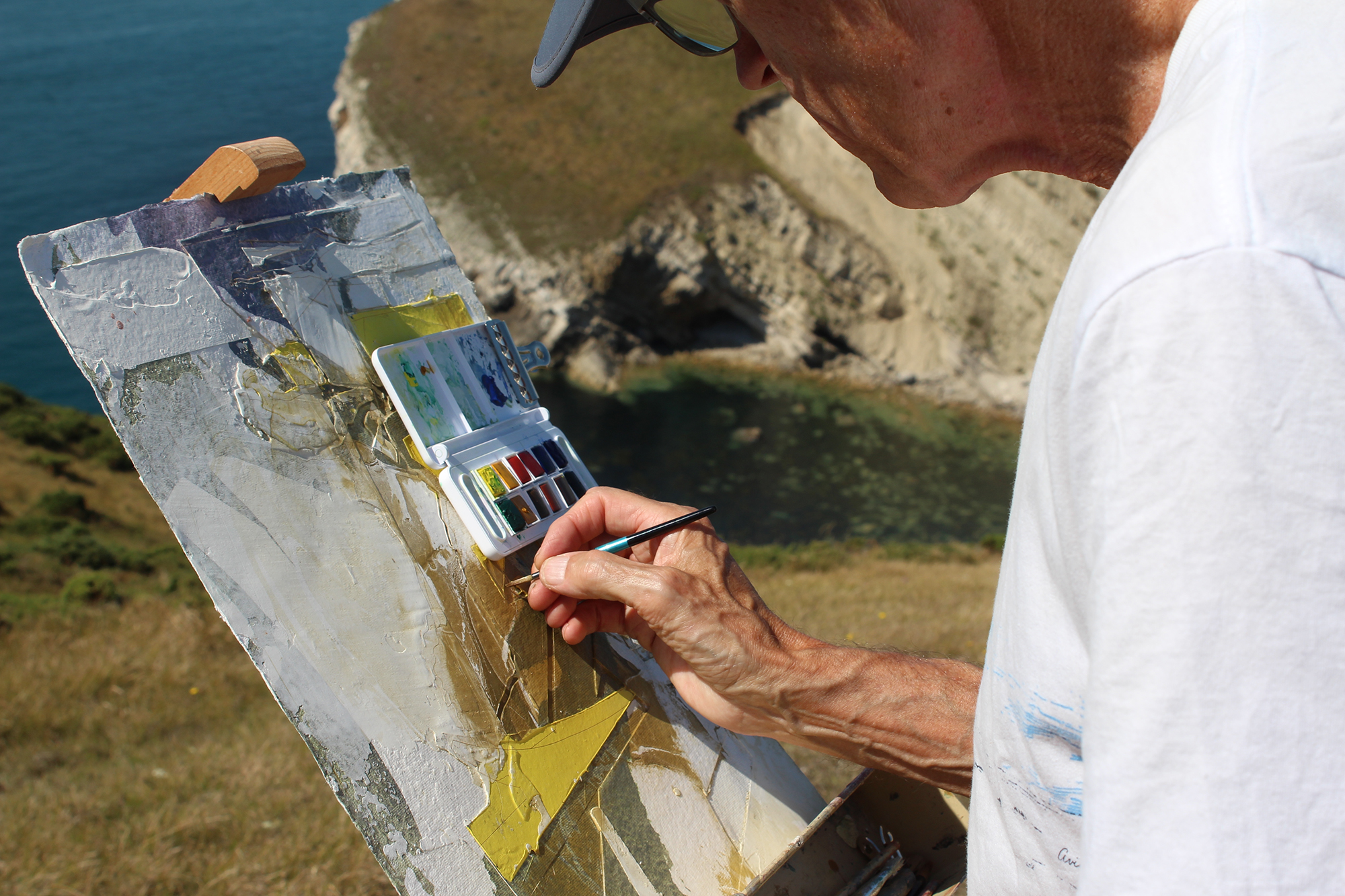
Jeremy Gardiner painting en plein air at Worbarrow Tout on the Jurassic Coast in Dorset, 2020

Gardiner seeks to capture the environmental processes that shape the surface of the earth, and his vision of landscape reflects the genius loci or sense of place of his subjects. His artworks have been compared with those of Paul Nash and Graham Sutherland. His paintings are the product of a long engagement with coastal landscapes in Britain. He has continued the approach to landscapes of 20th-century St Ives modernist artists such as Peter Lanyon, Ben Nicholson, and John Tunnard. Gardiner's landscape subjects have included locations from the Jurassic Coast, especially in Dorset, and the coastline of Cornwall, in southern England.

Jeremy Gardiner's work Purbeck Light Years used hybrid techniques combining computer animation, painting and drawing, and immersive virtual reality. Gardiner also worked on a project Light Years Coast, a virtual recreation of the Jurassic Coast in Dorset.

== Fellowships, grants, and awards ==
During 1984-86, Gardiner was a US Harkness Fellow in the MIT Media Lab at the Massachusetts Institute of Technology in the United States. Also in 1984, he was awarded a UK Churchill Fellowship.

Gardiner was the winner of the 2003 Peterborough Art prize for the work Purbeck Light Years. In 2013, he was awarded The Discerning Eye ING Art Prize for the work Pendeen Lighthouse Cornwall.

In 2017, Gardiner was awarded a Senior Fellowship by the UK Higher Education Academy; in 2020, he was awarded an Arts Council England Grant; and in 2022, he was awarded a British Council UK-China Connections through Culture Grant.

== Exhibitions ==
Gardiner's work has been exhibited widely, including at The Nine British Art, (London), Pallant House Gallery (Chichester), Portland Gallery (London) St Barbe Museum and Art Gallery (Lymington), and Southampton City Art Gallery (Southampton) in the UK. He has exhibited in the United Kingdom, China, and Portugal.

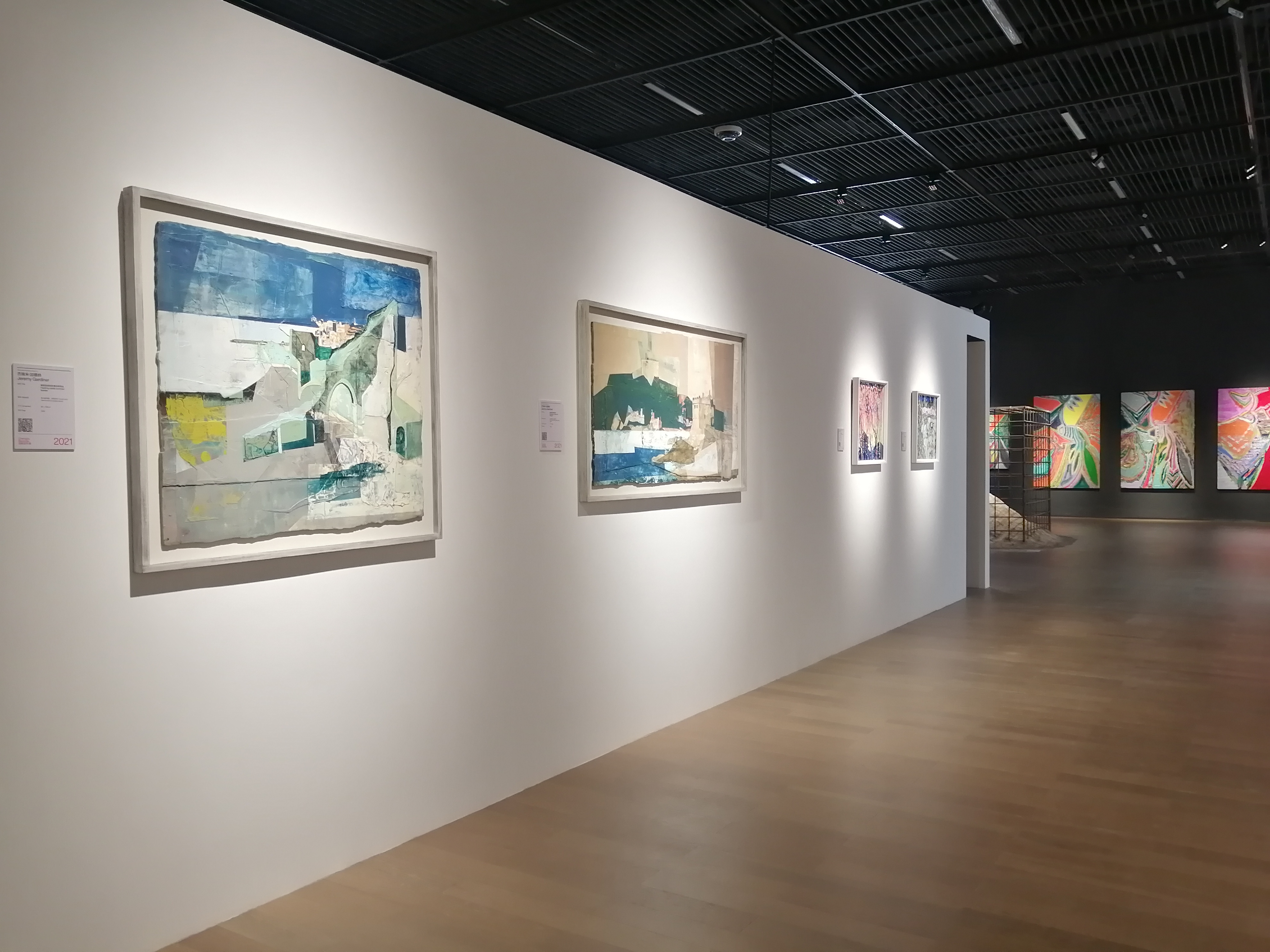
Artworks by Jeremy Gardiner at the Chengdu Tianfu Art Museum during the 2021 Chengdu Biennale in China

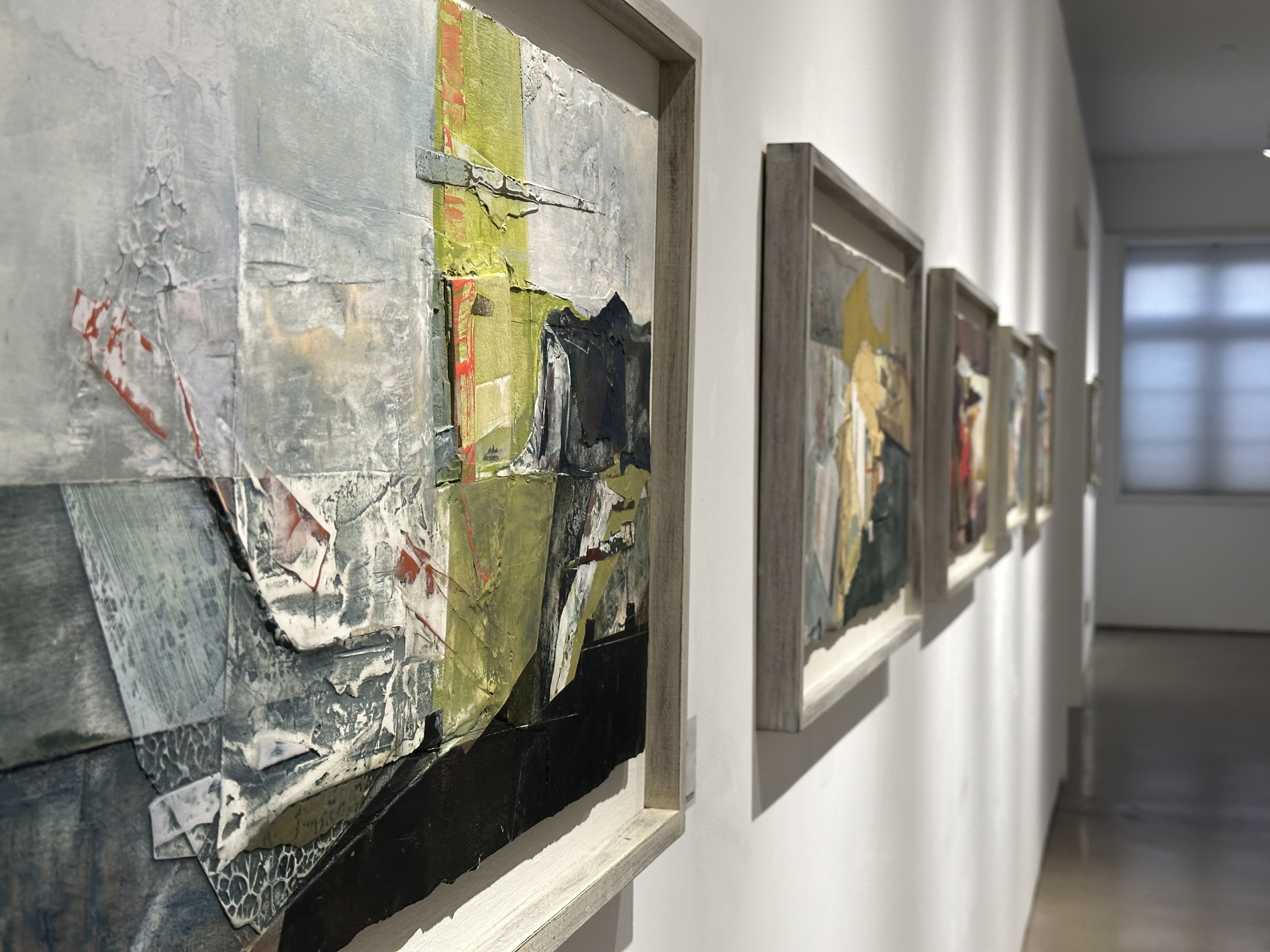
Concrete Abstraction, 2024 solo exhibition, Shanxi Contemporary Art Museum, Taiyuan, China

In 2021, Gardiner's work was included in the Chengdu Tianfu Art Museum as part of the Chengdu Biennale, China. In 2024, he had a solo exhibition, Concrete Abstraction, at the Shanxi Contemporary Art Museum, Taiyuan, China.

Selected solo exhibitions

- 2010: A Panoramic View, Pallant House Gallery, Chichester, UK
- 2013: Exploring the Elemental, Paisnel Gallery, London, UK
- 2013: Unfolding Landscape, Kings Place Gallery, London, UK
- 2013: Jeremy Gardiner, ING, City of London, UK
- 2015: Jurassic Coast, Victoria Art Gallery, Bath, Somerset, UK
- 2016: Pillars of Light, The Nine British Art, London, UK
- 2017: Drawn to the Coast, Paisnel Gallery, London, UK at the Paisnel Gallery, London
- 2018: Geology of Landscape, Candida Stevens Gallery, Chichester, UK
- 2019: Tintagel to Lulworth Cove, The Nine British Art, London, UK
- 2020: South by Southwest, St Barbe Museum and Art Gallery, Lymington, UK and The Nine British Art, London, UK
- 2022: Contraband, Candida Stevens Gallery, Chichester, UK
- 2024: Harbours and Havens, Portland Gallery, London, UK
- 2024: Turning the Tide, Sherborne House Regional Centre for the Arts, Sherborne Dorset, UK
- 2024: Concrete Abstraction, Shanxi Contemporary Art Museum, Taiyuan, China
- 2025: The Folds of Time: Jeremy Gardiner's Geological Landscapes, Jiechen Gallery, Taiyuan, China
- 2026: Jeremy Gardiner: Strata – Painting the Jurassic Coast, Southampton City Art Gallery, Southampton, UK
- 2026: The Lake District, Portland Gallery, London, UK
- 2026: Topographies in Clay, Objectismo Gallery, Lisbon, Portugal

Selected group exhibitions

- 1986: 42nd Venice Biennale, Venice, Italy
- 2010: Earthscapes, Geology and Geography, Thelma Hulbert Gallery, Honiton, Devon, UK
- 2013: The ING Discerning Eye 2013 Exhibition, Mall Galleries, London, UK (prizewinner)
- 2015: Shorelines, St Barbe Museum, Lymington, UK
- 2015–16: Facing History, Victoria & Albert Museum, London, UK
- 2017: Capture the Castle, British Artists and the Castle, Southampton City Art Gallery, Southampton, UK
- 2019: The Sunday Times Watercolour Competition, Mall Galleries, London, UK
- 2021–22: Superfusion, Chengdu Biennale, Chengdu, China
- 2022: Sussex Landscape: Chalk, Wood and Water, Pallant House Gallery, Chichester, UK
- 2024: Dorset Pavilion, 60th Venice Biennale, Italy
- 2024: Artists in Purbeck, Russell-Cotes Art Gallery & Museum, Bournemouth, UK
- 2025: Every Step of the Way, The ARC, Winchester, UK

== Works in collections ==
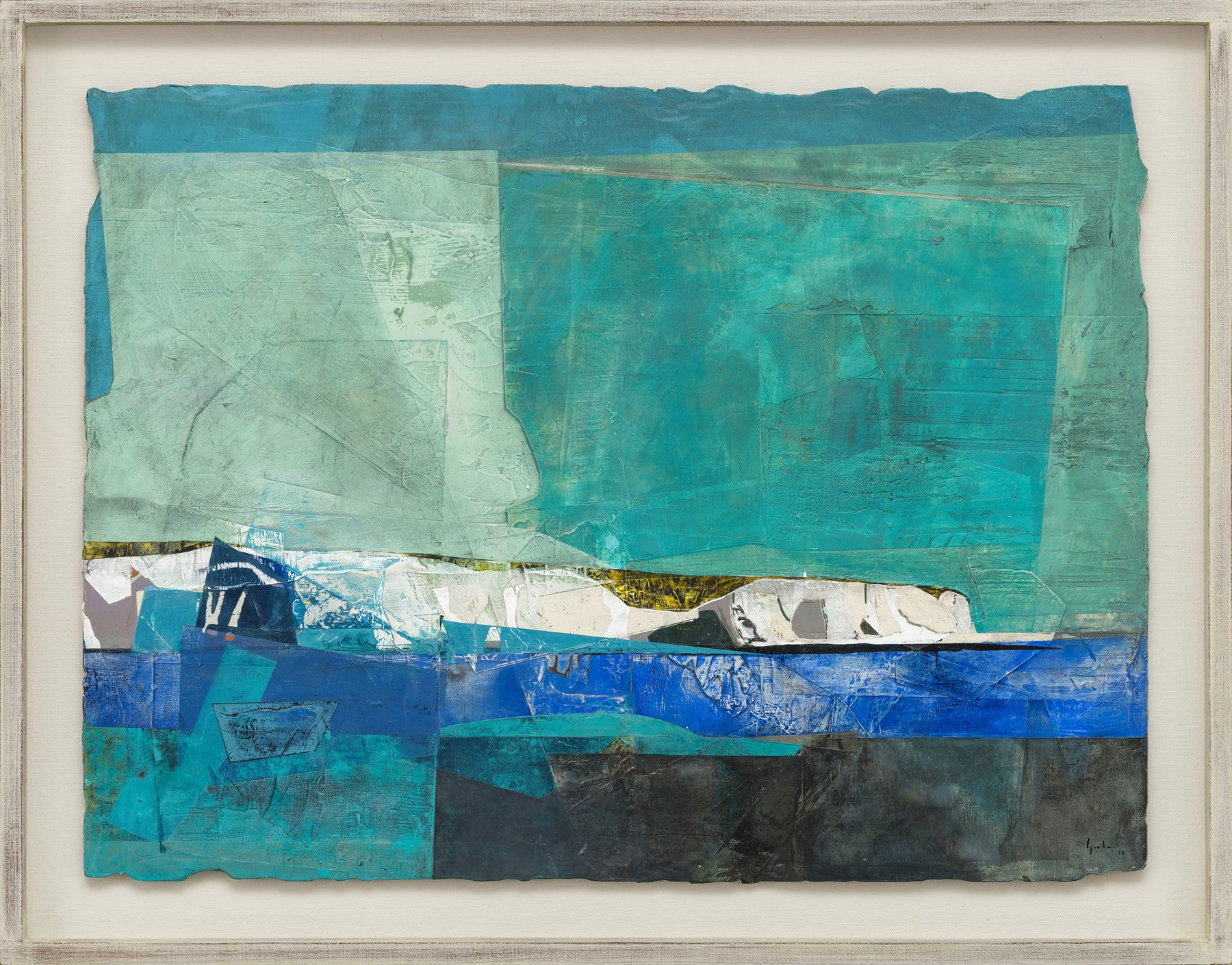
Southforeland Lighthouse, Kent, by Jeremy Gardiner

Jeremy Gardiner's paintings are held in international collections in the United Kingdom including Hatton Gallery, Pallant House Gallery, Southampton City Art Gallery, Victoria Art Gallery, and elsewhere. Other collections with his work include BNP Paribas, London; Davis Polk & Wardwell, Paris; Ente Nazionale Idrocarburi (Eni), Milan; Government Art Collection, London; Imperial College Art Collection, London; ING Group, Amsterdam; NYNEX Corporate Collection, USA; Pinsent Masons; Royal College of Art Collection, London; Victoria and Albert Museum (V&A), London.

== Academic positions ==
In parallel with being an artist, Jeremy Gardiner has held academic positions at Birkbeck, University of London, the University of West London, Bath Spa University, the University of Florida, Printmaking at the Royal College of Art, Department of Digital Arts at the Pratt Institute (New York), the Media Lab at the Massachusetts Institute of Technology, and a full professor position at Ravensbourne University London in east London.
