= Lü Peng (critic) =

- 吕澎 (in Chinese)
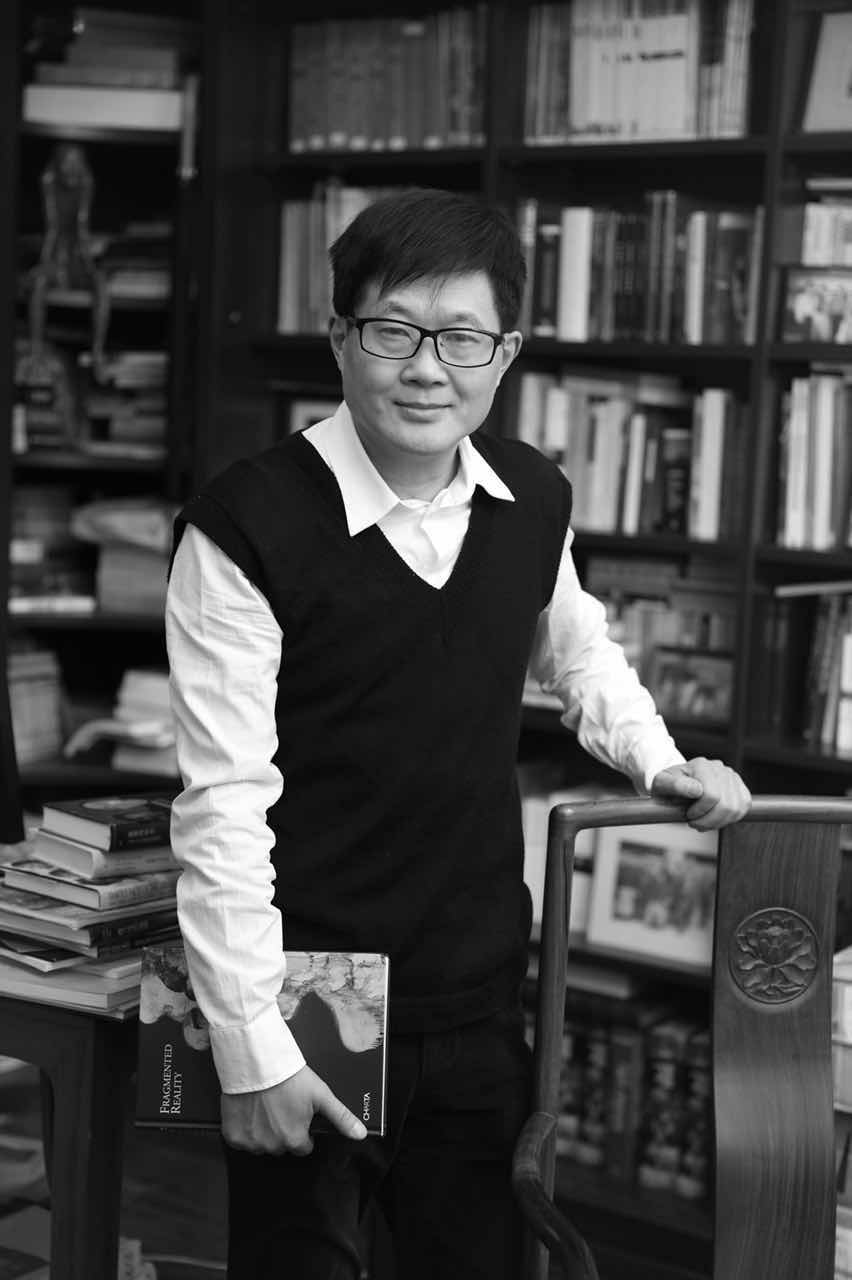
- Lü Peng in 2017
- Born: 1956 (age 69–70); Chengdu, Sichuan, China
- Education: Sichuan Normal University; China Academy of Art
- Occupations: Art historian; author; curator; museum director
- Employer(s): Chengdu Museum of Contemporary Art; China Academy of Art; L-Art University; Sichuan Fine Arts Institute; Xi'an Academy of Fine Arts
- Known for: Chengdu Biennale

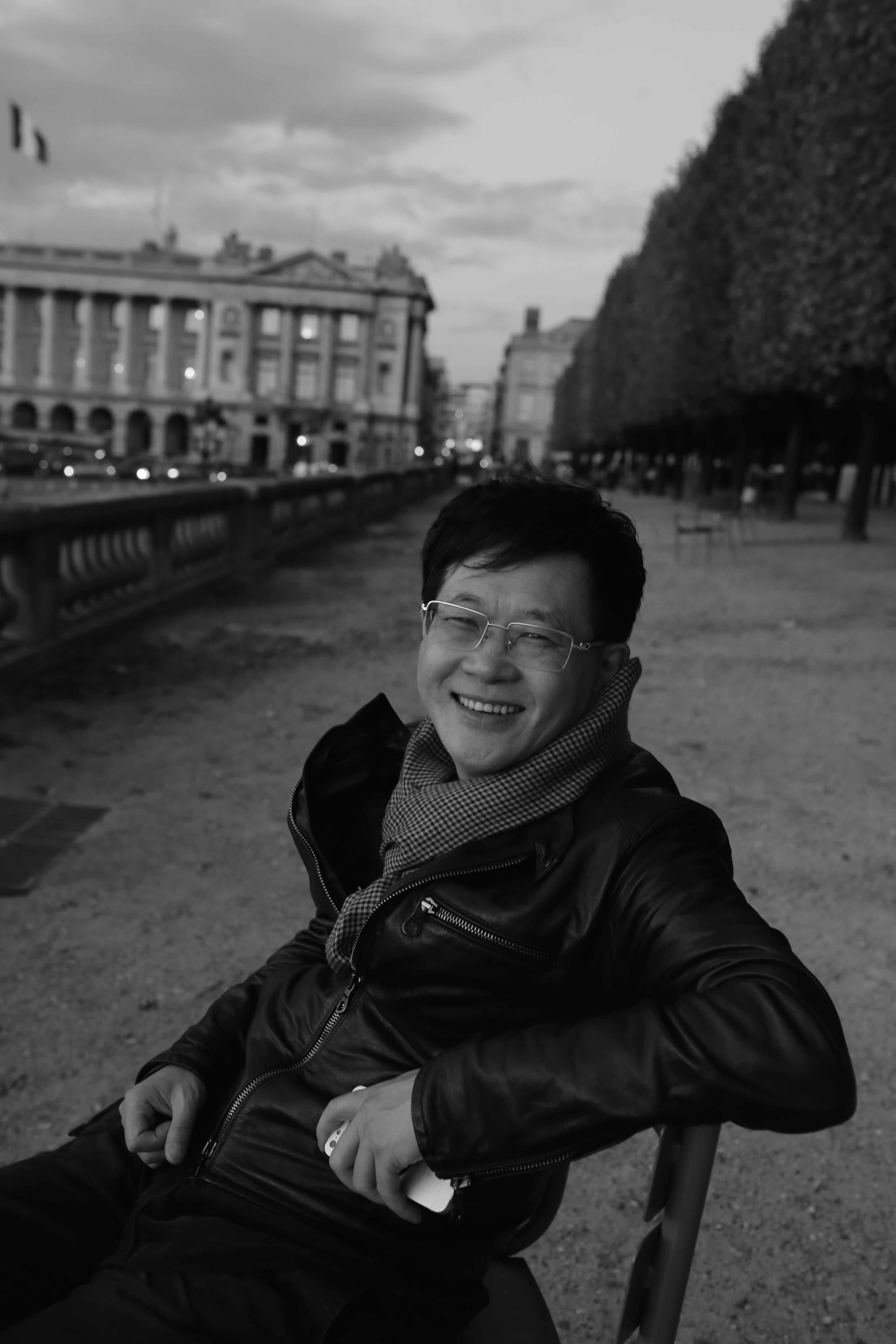
Lü Peng, 14 October 2014

Lü Peng (Chinese: 吕澎, born 1956) is a Chinese curator, critic and art historian. He has engaged extensively with Chinese modern and contemporary art for over thirty years. Lü Peng's Personal Website: luhistory.com.

== Education ==
Lü was born in 1956 in Chongqing, Sichuan. He graduated from the Political Studies Department of Sichuan Normal University in 1982, and was awarded a PhD in Critical Art Theory from the China Academy of Art in 2004.

== Career ==
Lü was Editor in Chief of the journal Theatre and Film from 1982–85 and subsequently served as Vice-Secretary of the Sichuan Dramatists Society from 1986–90. He then held the position of Executive Editor at the magazine Art & Market. In 1992, he was Artistic Director of the Guangzhou Biennale (officially titled the First Guangzhou Biennial Art Fair). His curatorial work includes: “A Gift to Marco Polo” (an event for the Venice Biennale, 2009), which showcased eight of China’s most prominent contemporary artists; “Reshaping History” (Beijing, 2010), a large-scale exposition presenting more than one thousand works by nearly two hundred of the most innovative Chinese artists of the first decade of the 21st century; and “Pure Views: New Painting from China” (Louise Blouin Foundation, Frieze, London, 2010), “Pure Views: New Painting from China” (Asian Art Museum, San Francisco, 2011); and the 2011 Chengdu Biennale.

Lü is Director of the Museum of Contemporary Art Chengdu, Director of ChinART, the management agency of Chinese art institutions, and is Associate Professor of the Department of Art History and Theory at the China Academy of Art, Hangzhou, Zhejiang Province. He is a consulting authority for a number of Chinese government organisations and mainland Chinese companies.

In 2017, he took on the roles of the President of L-Art University, Professor of Sichuan Fine Arts Institute, and Macau University of Science and Technology.

== A History of Art in 20th-century China ==
A History of Art in 20th-Century China is Lü Peng’s significant scholarly work that offers a comprehensive historical account of modern and contemporary Chinese art from the late nineteenth century to the early twenty-first century]. In the preface, he confessed that he was influenced by many Western art history books and methodologies, while viewing and writing about Chinese art especially modern Chinese art in the age of globalisation, a set of localised theories was necessary:

In the course of China’s reform and opening, I read Herbert Read’s Concise History of Western Painting (Frederick A. Praeger, New York 1959). As for H.H. Arnason’s History of Modern Art: Painting, Sculpture, Architecture (Prentice-Hall, Englewood Cliffs, New Jersey 1978) and Ernest H. Gombrich’s The Story of Art (Phaidon Press Limited, 1983, 1984), I did not read them until a few years after graduation. These western works of art history had a big influence on me. But when confronting China’s ‘modern’ or ‘contemporary’ art, I felt the need to adopt a different method more suited to the subject. In view of the uniqueness of Chinese art and its context, I established a method of historical judgment based on a special background of politics, economics, culture and clashing civilizations. In my ‘Preface’ to the first Chinese edition I wrote of this in detail.

Since its initial publication, A History of Art in 20th-Century China has undergone four revised editions and has been published in five languages: Chinese, English, French, Korean, and Italian. The most recent revised edition, titled A History of Chinese Art in the 20th and 21st Century, was published by Macmillan in 2025.

== Books ==
- Modern Painting: New Imagery Language (Shandong Literature and Art Press, 1987)
- Aesthetics of Modern European Painting (Lingnan Art Publishing House, 1989)
- Art-Revelation of Man (Lingnan Fine Arts Press, 1990)
- (with Yi Dan) Twentieth-Century Art Culture (Hunan Fine Arts Press, 1990)
- Critique of Modern Art and Culture (Sichuan Fine Arts Press, 1992)
- (with Yi Dan) History of China Modern Art: 1979–1989 (Hunan Fine Arts Press, 1992)
- Art Operation (Chengdu Publishing House, 1994)
- History of China Modern Art: 1990–1999 (Hunan Fine Arts Press, 2000)
- Planning and Operation: Olet Real Estate Marketing Planning (Hunan Fine Arts Press, 2000)
- Pure Views--Remote from Streams and Mountain: Chinese Landscape Painting in the 10th–13th Centuries (Chinese People’s University Press, 2004)
- Nature Speaking, co-authored with Li Zehou/Zhao Shilin/Yi Dan/Shu Qun/Xiao Quan (Hunan Fine Art Publishing House, 2004)
- A History of Art in Twentieth-Century China (Peking University Press, 2006; New Star Press, 2013)
- Artists in Art History (Hunan Fine Arts Press, 2008)
- A History of Art in Twentieth - Century China（Revised Edition) (Peking University Press, 2009)
- The Story of “Art” in China (Peking University Press, 2010)
- China Contemporary Art in The Historical Process and Market Trends (Peking University Press, 2010)
- A History of Art in 20th-Century China (Charta, 2010)
- The Art History of China Since 1979, co-authored with Yi Dan (China Youth Press, 2011)
- From San Servolo to Amalfi: Notes of a Chinese Curator in Venice (Charta, 2011)
- A Pocket History of 20th Century Chinese Art (Charta, 2011)
- A History of Art in China year by year [from 1900 to 2010], 2012, Chinese Young Publishing House
- Documents of Chinese art in Twentieth Century: A Sourcebook [with Kong Lin-wei], 2012
- A Pocket History of 20th Century Chinese Art (Charta, 2011)
- Fragmented Reality: Contemporary Art in 21st Century China (Charta, 2012)
- How to Study and Research Art History (Peking University Press, November 2013)
- Histoire de l'art chinois au XXe siècle (Somogy éditions d'art, 2013)
- A History of Art in Twentieth-Century China (Somogy éditions d'art, 2013)
- 20세기 중국미술사 (Hangilart, 2013)
- Contemporary Art in 21st Century China: 2000 - 2010 (Hunan Fine Arts Publishing House, 2014)
- The Collected Articles of Lü Peng (Shanxi Publishing Media Group-Beiyue Literature & Art Publishing House, January 2015)
- The Story of "Art" in China—Form Late Qing Dynasty to Present（Revised Edition) (Guangxi Normal University Press Group, 2015)
- Blood Lines: Zhang Xiaogang Before 1996 (Guangxi Normal University Press Group, April 2016)
- Bloodlines: The Zhang Xiaogang Story (Skira, 2016)
- Bloodlines, Les Liens Du Sang - L'histoire De Zhang Xiaogang, Des Débuts À 1996 (Skira, 2017)
- Chinese Contemporary Art since 1989 (Somogy éditions d'art, 2018)
- Story of Parent Incon: Mao Xuhui In The 1980s (New Star Press, December 2019)
- Pure Views Remote from Streams and Mountains: Landscape Painting of Chinese Song Dynasty (Shanghai Century Publishing (Group) Co., Ltd (Shanghai Calligraphy and Painting Publishing House), January 2020)
- A History of Modern Art in China (Shanghai Century Publishing (Group) Co., Ltd (Shanghai Calligraphy and Painting Publishing House), August 2019)
- A History of Contemporary Art in China (Shanghai Century Publishing (Group) Co., Ltd (Shanghai Calligraphy and Painting Publishing House), July 2020)
- A Brief History of Modern Western Painting (Shanghai Century Publishing (Group) Co., Ltd (Shanghai Calligraphy and Painting Publishing House), July 2020)
- Cultural Landscape of Imperial China: A Historical Shape from the Qin and Han Dynasties to The Reform Movement of 1989 (Guangxi Normal University Press, 2020)
- An Introduction to Art History Study and Writing (Peking University Press, June 2020)
- The Vision of History: The Collected Essays on Art History (The Commercial Press, June 2023)
- A History of Painting in China: From 1978 to Now, co-authored with Li Guohua (Shanghai Century Publishing (Group) Co., Ltd (Shanghai Calligraphy and Painting Publishing House), November 2023)
- A History of China in the 20th Century (Palgrave Macmillan, 2023)
- Storia dell’arte cinese dal XX al XXI secolo (RIZZOLI, 2023)
- Emergence of the Patriarch: The Mao Xuhui Story (Skira 2024)
- A History of Chinese Art in the 20th and 21st Century (Palgrave Macmillan, 2025)
