= Martin Rendel =

German cultural manager and university professor

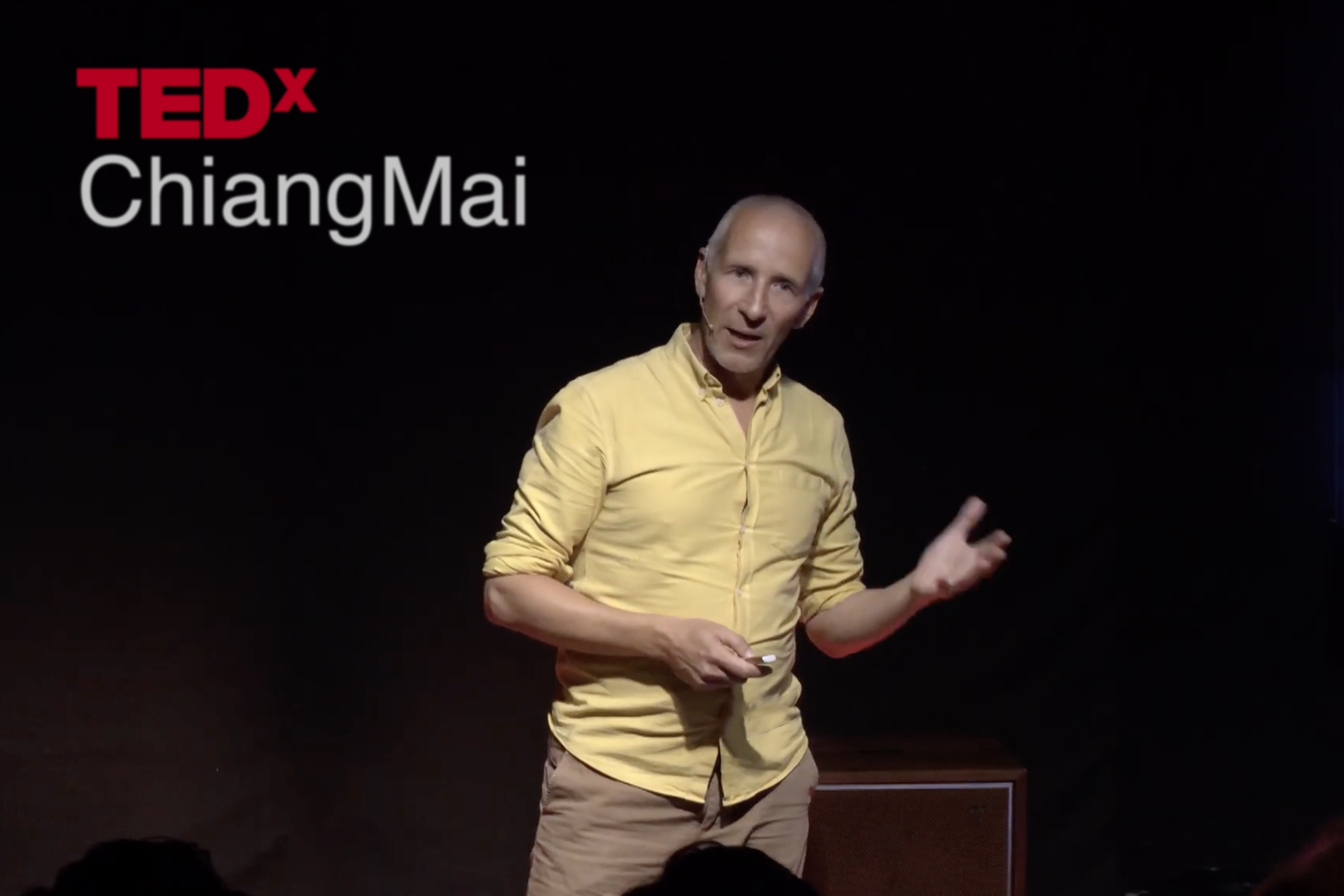
Martin Rendel at the TEDx Conference in Chiang Mai, Thailand

Martin Rendel (born 1968 in Limburg an der Lahn) is a German cultural manager and university professor. Innovation through intercultural and interdisciplinary cooperation is the main focus of his work.

== Biography ==
Rendel studied industrial design at the Darmstadt University of Applied Sciences (h_da), Germany, and communication design at ArtCenter College of Design in La Tour-de-Peilz, Switzerland. During his studies he worked in the design studios of Aldo Cibic (Milan), Matteo Thun (Milan) and Dieter Sieger (Harkotten Castle, Sassenberg). His final work, a water-closet, attracted a great deal of media interest after AP photographer Karsten Thielker became aware of the project during a private stay in Darmstadt in 1992 and had the photos distributed via Associated Press. Sueddeutsche Zeitung celebrated the work as a "cultural revolution". The object has been part of the permanent collection at the Museum of Toilet History in Kiev (Ukraine) since 2021 under the name "Latrina Obliqua". In February 2024, Rendel told the story of Latrina Obliqua for the first time in public at the TEDxChiangMai conference under the title "The Incredible Story of My Mother's Cleaning Bucket".

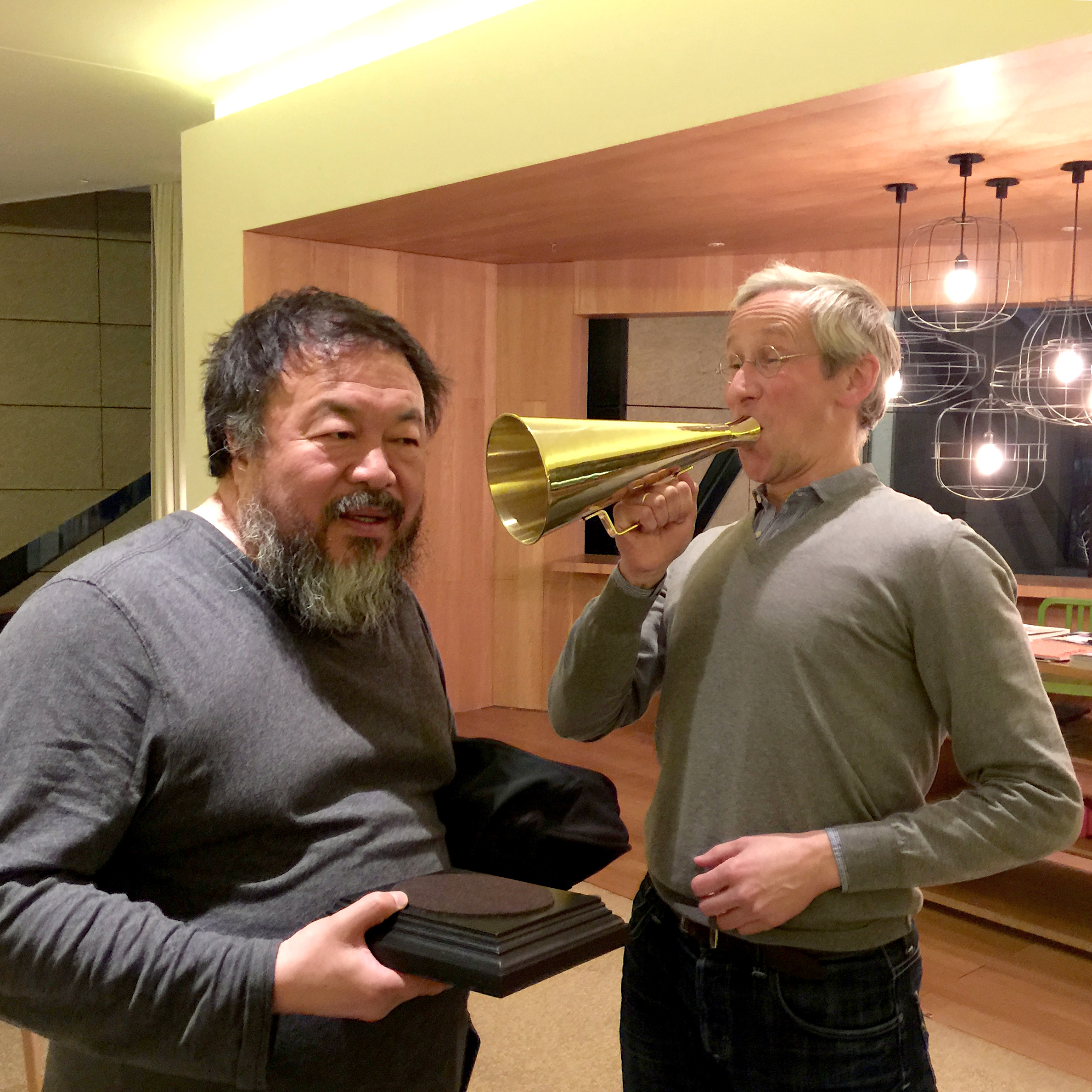
Testing the "K26 Film Award" with Ai Weiwei, 2015

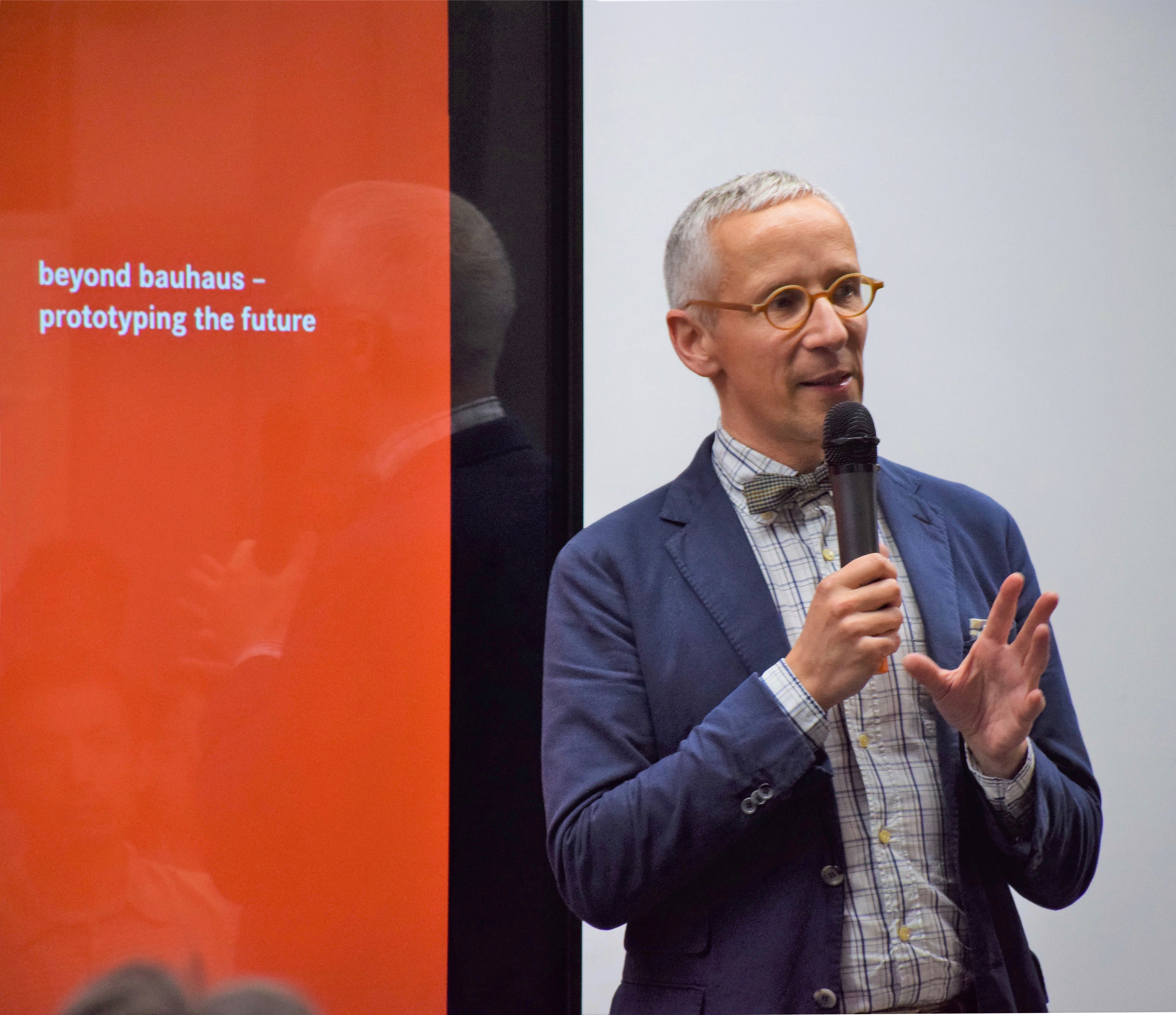
"Beyond Bauhaus" lecture at the Beijing Institute of Technology Zhuhai 2019

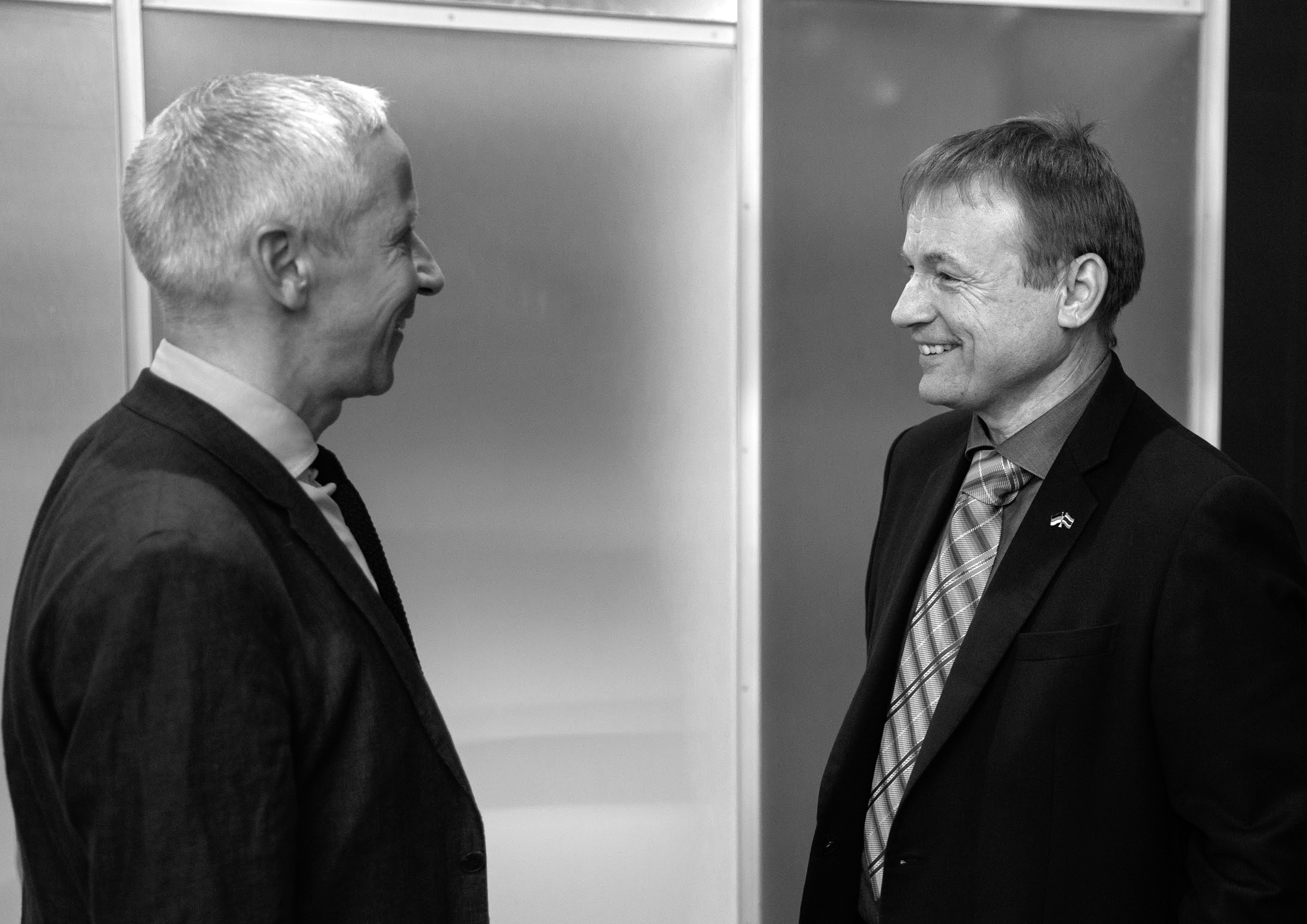
Opening of "Invisible Things" at TCDC Museum Bangkok with the German Ambassador to Thailand Georg Schmidt, 2019

In 2015 Rendel and the Chinese artist Li Xue founded the art association K29 in Düsseldorf, which advocated freedom of expression in art. Personal differences in the founding phase led to the refounding under the name K26. One of K26's first major projects in the same year was the performance of the Beijing Independent Film Festival (BIFF) during Filmfest Hamburg, which director Albert Wiederspiel made possible as a festival within the festival. The project found renowned supporters such as Alexander Kluge, Michael Kahn-Ackermann and Ai Wei Wei. However, it created diplomatic tensions between Germany and China. The Chinese festival director Li Xianting and his team had to be uninvited and the cooperation ended with immediate effect. The festival nevertheless took place and the winners of the "K26 Film Award" received their prizes at the opening ceremony in Hamburg. Since then the activities of K26 focus on the field of photography.

In addition to Zhuhai, Rendel has also been a visiting professor at King Mongkut's Institute of Technology Ladkrabang in Bangkok since 2019.

== Exhibitions & festivals (selection) ==
- 2019 "Invisible Things" TCDC Museum, Bangkok, curated with Philip Cornwel-Smith and Piboon Amornjiraporn
- 2018 "Invisible Things", TCDC Museum, Chiang Mai, curated with Philip Cornwel-Smith and Piboon Amornjiraporn
- 2018 "The Second Image of Silk Road", Tianshui Photography Biennale, guest curator
- 2016 "Parabiosis", Changjiang Museum of Contemporary Art, Chongqing, guest curator
- 2015 "Chinese Independent Cinema", EthnoFilmFest Munich, curated with Stefan Eisenhofer
- 2015 "Beijing Independent Film Festival", Filmfest Hamburg, curated with Jens Geiger
- 2015 "Jiang Jian", Gallery Julian Sander, curated with Julian Sander and Catherine Cheng
- 2014 "August Sander & Jiang Jian", Photo Shanghai, curated with Julian Sander and Catherine Cheng
- 2014 "Purple.Blue.", A tribute to Kong Qian No. 6 Zone Museum of Art, Tianjin, curated with Catherine Cheng
- 2014 "Jiang Jian – Archives" PhotoBookMuseum, Cologne, curated with Markus Schaden and Catherine Cheng
- 2014 "Invisible Things" Museum am Rothenbaum - Cultures and Arts of the World, Hamburg, curated with Wu Xuefu and René Spitz
- 2013 "Invisible Things", Today Art Museum, Beijing, curated with Wu Xuefu and René Spitz
- 2011 "Reihenhausmannskost", MAKK - Museum of Applied Arts Cologne, curated with René Spitz
- 2010 "Neighbourhood", Neues Museum, Nuremberg, curated with René Spitz
- 2008 "In German Terraced Houses", MAKK - Museum of Applied Arts Cologne, curated with René Spitz
- 2007 "Cabinet Pieces", Excelsior Hotel Ernst, Cologne, during RheinDesign Festival, curated with René Spitz
- 2006 "Dear Diary", Eigelstein 115, Cologne, curated with René Spitz
- 2004 "Not identified", Eigelstein 115, Cologne, curated with René Spitz
- 2003 "Blossoming Gap", Eigelstein 115, Cologne, curated with René Spitz
- 2002 "Expanding the Gap", Eigelstein 115, Cologne, curated with René Spitz
- 2001 "Daring the Gap", Eigelstein 115, Cologne, curated with René Spitz

== Publications (selection) ==
Published with K26 Sino-German Art Association by Kettler:

- 2016 "Archives on Orphans", photographs by Jiang Jian, ISBN 978-3-86206-500-4
- 2015 "Negatives", photographs by Xu Yong, ISBN 978-3-86206-529-5

Edited with Daniel Arnold and René Spitz at Callwey, Munich:

- 2013 "Wir bauen Deutschland – We are building Germany", ISBN 978-3868591811
- 2011 "Reihenhausmannskost – Home cooking in terraced houses", ISBN 978-3766718938
- 2010 "Ein Schloss in der Stadt – A castle in the city", ISBN 978-3766718730
- 2009 "Nachbarschaft – Neighbourhood", ISBN 978-3766718174
- 2008 "In deutschen Reihenhäusern – In German terraced houses", ISBN 978-3766717900

Edited with René Spitz at Axel Menges, Stuttgart / London:

- 2006 "Dear Diary", ISBN 3-936681-09-0
- 2005 "Unfilled gap", ISBN 3-932565-51-7
- 2004 "Not identified", ISBN 3-932565-40-1
- 2003 "Blossoming gap", ISBN 3-932565-22-3
- 2002 "Expanding the gap", ISBN 3-932565-28-2
- 2001 "Daring the gap", ISBN 3-932565-22-3
