= Guillaume de Sardes =

French writer, art historian, and photographer

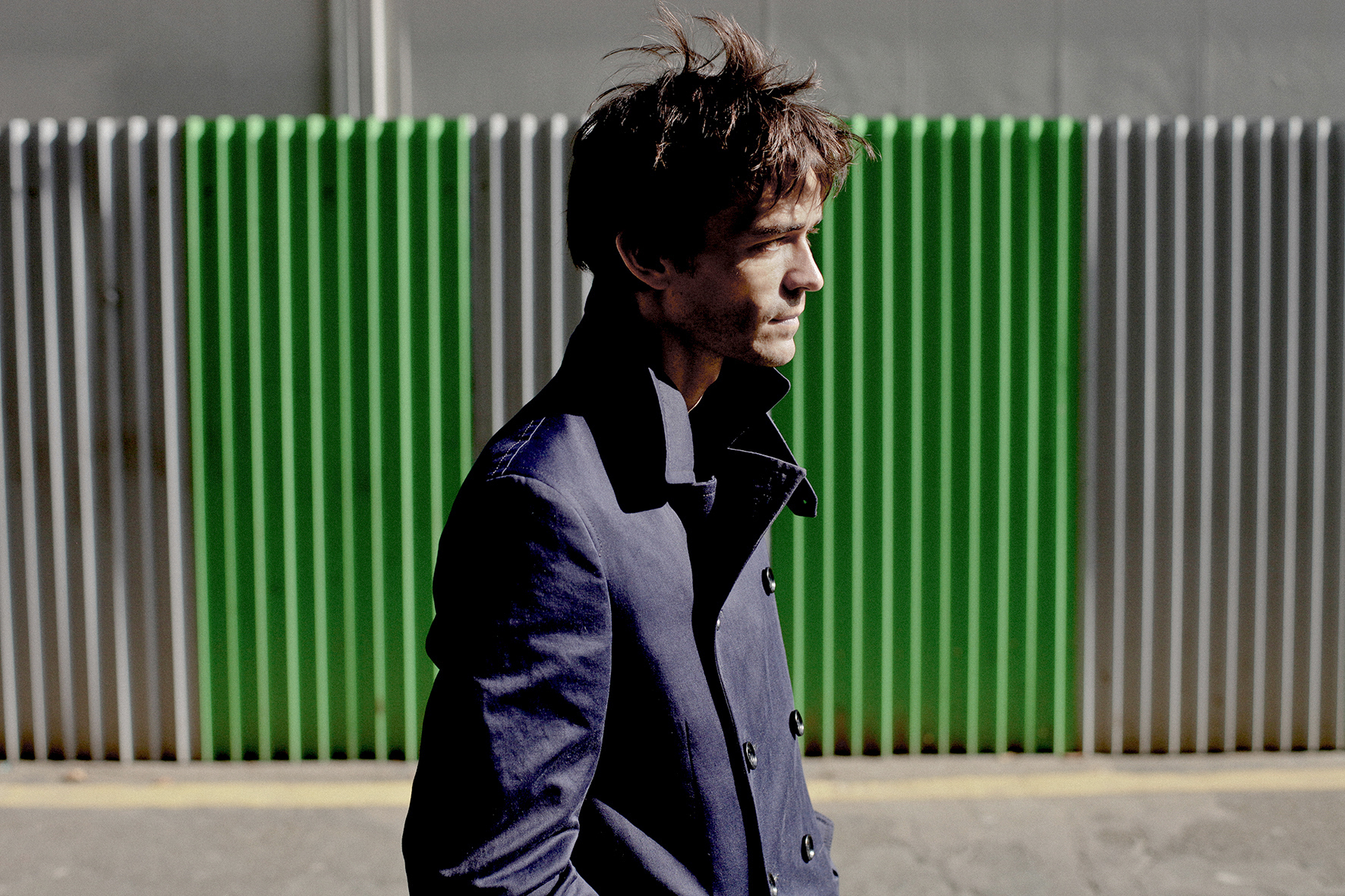
Guillaume de Sardes in Paris in 2012

Guillaume de Sardes is a writer, art historian, and photographer.

== Early life ==
Guillaume de Sardes (born Boissard) was born in Périgueux, France.

== Career ==
=== Writing ===
Guillaume de Sardes is an essayist, photographer and novelist.

His first novel, Giovanni Pico, published in 2007, is about the humanist Jean Pic de la Mirandole, for which he won the Prix Ulysse. La Dernière passion de Son Éminence, published in 2008, is an ironic and light novel. It was inspired by a real news story, on which the lawyer Jacques Vergès worked: a triple murder that took place in the Vatican City in 1998. Action is however transposed to 1939. Son éminence en rose et blanc (2011) uses the same characters, but the plot is pure fantasy in this work. Le Nil est froid, published in 2009 and for which De Sardes won the Prix François Mauriac in 2010, explores the themes of war, obsessions and of artistic creation; its setting is Bonaparte's Egyptian Campaign. Le Dédain explores the different ways of loving in contemporary Paris.

De Sardes is also a specialist in Russian ballet. He has written a biography of Vaslav Nijinsky, and edited and translated the Memoirs of Serge Diaghilev.

As a literary critic, he collaborates with magazines like Commentaire, Edwarda, and literary newspapers like Service littéraire. He is the editor of Prussian Blue (magazine), an art magazine.

=== Other work ===
De Sardes' work as a photographer and a videographer, regularly exhibited in France and abroad, explores themes such as intimacy, wandering, and night.

== Recognition and awards ==
De Sardes has been awarded the following prizes:

- Prix Ulysse du premier roman (2008)
- Prix Bourgogne de littérature (2009)
- Prix François Mauriac de l'Académie française (2010)

== Selected publications ==
=== Novels ===
- Giovanni Pico, Paris, Hermann, 2007
- La Dernière passion de Son Éminence, Paris, Hermann, 2008
- Le Nil est froid, Paris, Hermann, 2009
- Son Éminence en rose-et-blanc, Paris, Grasset, 2011
- Le Dédain, Paris, Grasset, 2012

=== Essays ===
- Nijinski, sa vie, son geste, sa pensée, Paris Hermann, 2006.

=== Editing and text translation ===
- Memoirs of Serge Diaghilev

=== Photobooks ===
- "New territories", with Nicolas Comment, Ola Rindal, Henry Roy, presentation by Dominique Baqué, Paris, 2014

== Photography exhibits ==
- Paris-Tokyo aller-retour (collective exhibit), 2015, Paris, Japanese cultural House in Paris (French: Maison de la culture du Japon à Paris)
- "Vie secrètes", 2015, Tirana, TULLA culture center.
- Possession immédiate (collective exhibit), 2015, Paris, galerie 24B.
- MTAG goupshow (collective exhibit), 2014, Paris, More Than A Gallery.
- "Vies secrètes", 2014, Paris, Myriam Bouagal Gallery
- New territories, 2014, Beyrouth, Gathering/Institut français.
