= Chengdu Tianfu Art Museum =

- 成都市天府美术馆
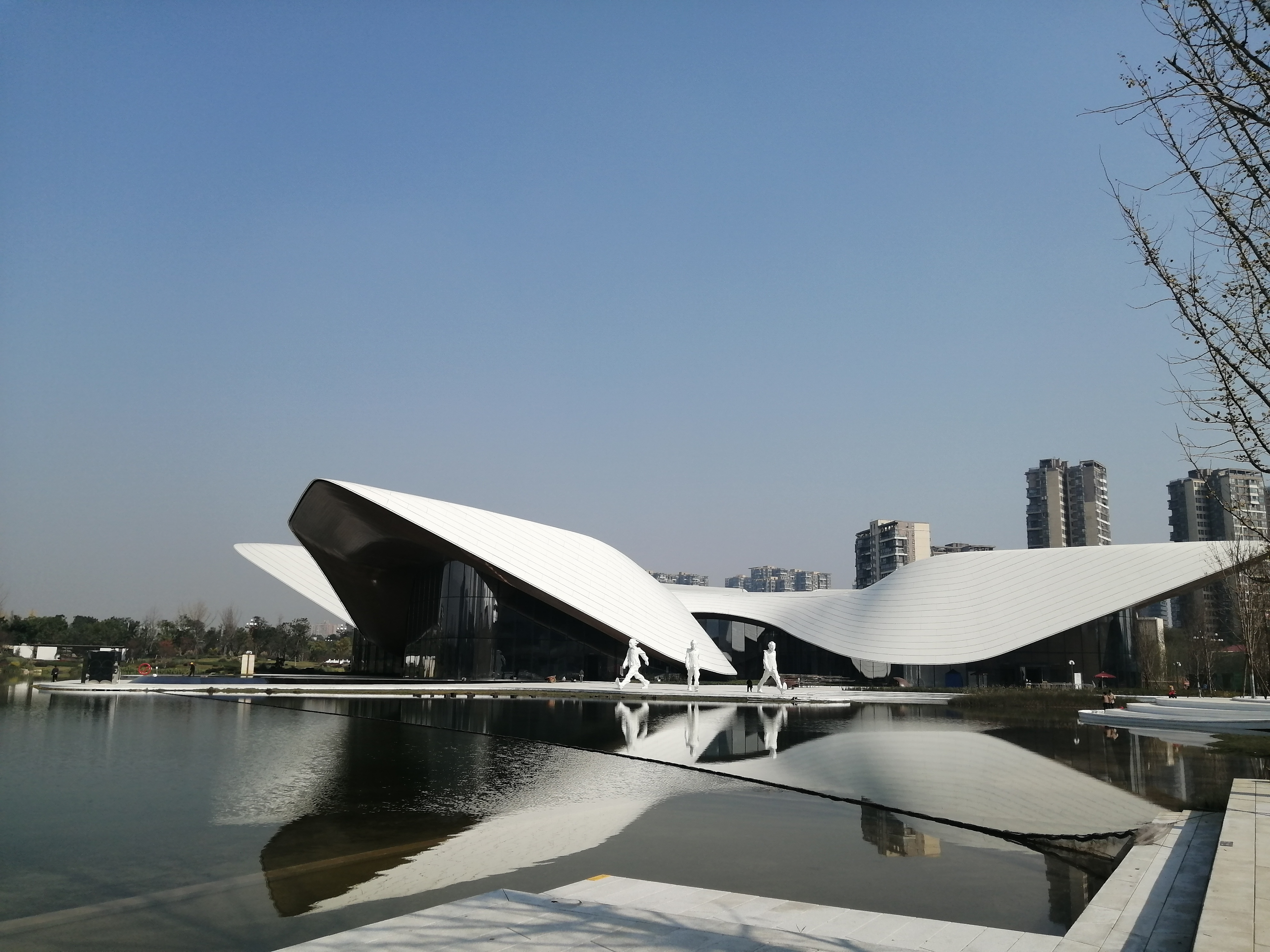
- View of the museum, across Yinggui Lake at the Tianfu Art Park
- Established: 6 November 2021; 4 years ago
- Location: Tianfu Art Park, Jinniu District, Chengdu, Sichuan, China
- Coordinates: 30°42′54.67″N 104°01′18.58″E
- Type: Art museum
- Collections: Chinese art
- Founder: Chengdu Art Academy

Chengdu Tianfu Art Museum (Chinese: 成都市天府美术馆) is a public contemporary art museum in Chengdu, Sichuan, China.

== Overview ==
The museum is located within the Tianfu Art Park in the Jinniu District of Chengdu. It opened in the park, along with the new Chengdu Museum of Contemporary Art, at the time of the 2021 Chengdu Biennale, which was held in these two museums, organized by the Chengdu Art Academy. The museum is intended to focus on local art in Chengdu. The roof shape of the building is in the form of hibiscus petals, the city flower of Chengdu.

== See also ==
- Chengdu Art Academy
- Chengdu Biennale
- Chengdu Museum of Contemporary Art
- Tianfu Art Park

== Gallery ==
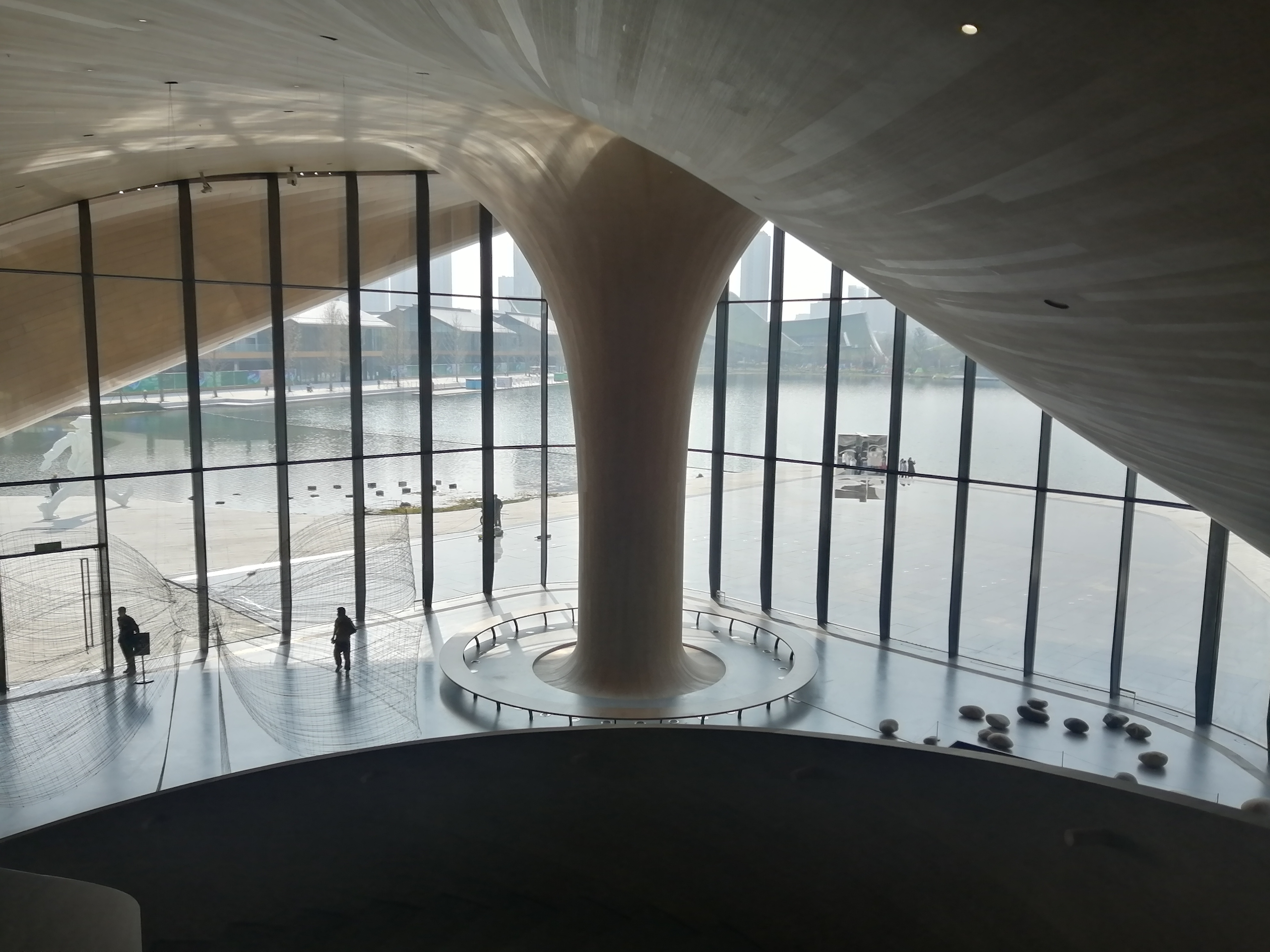
Entrance hall of the museum, looking out towards the lake

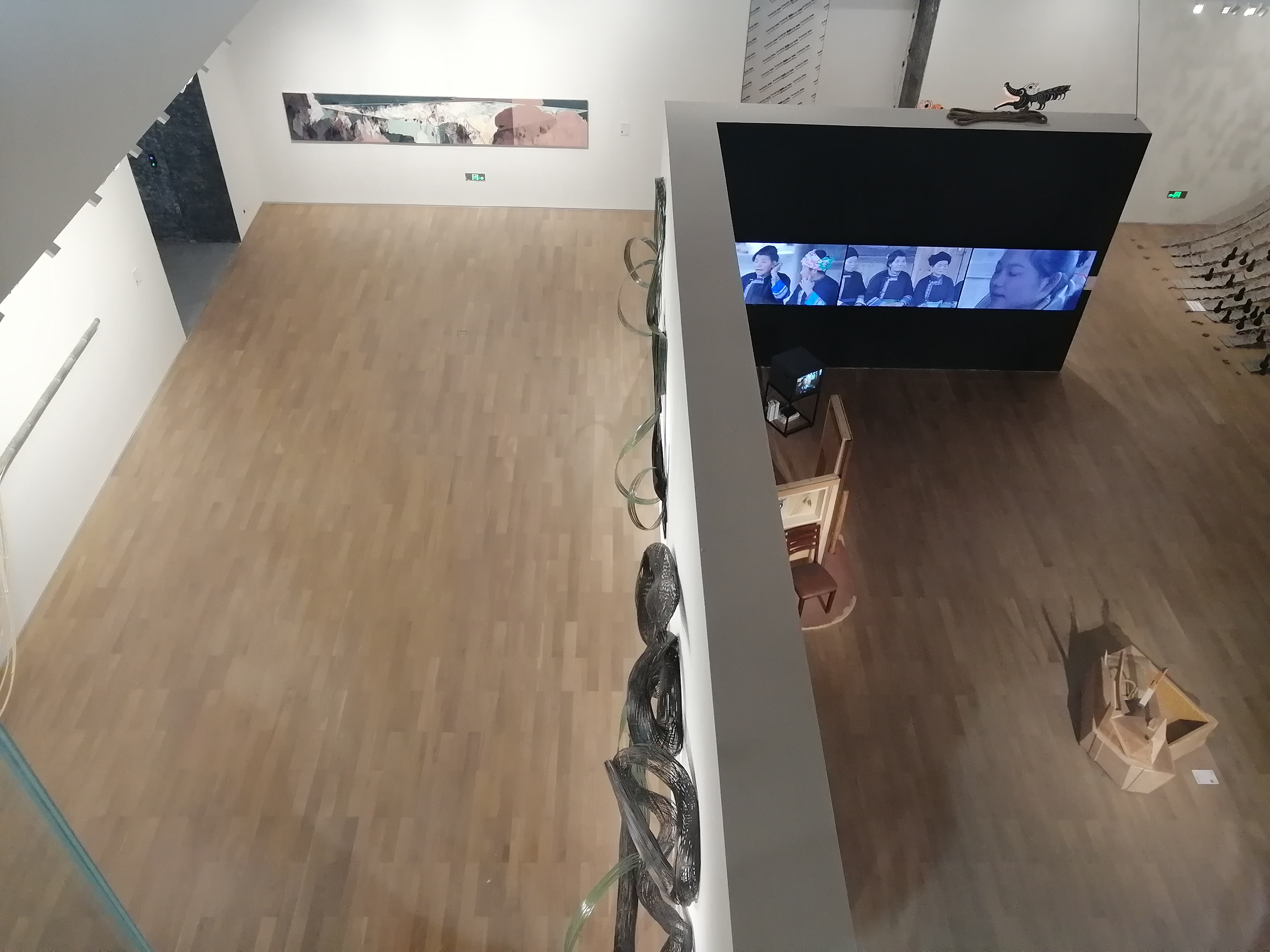
Gallery 1 of the museum

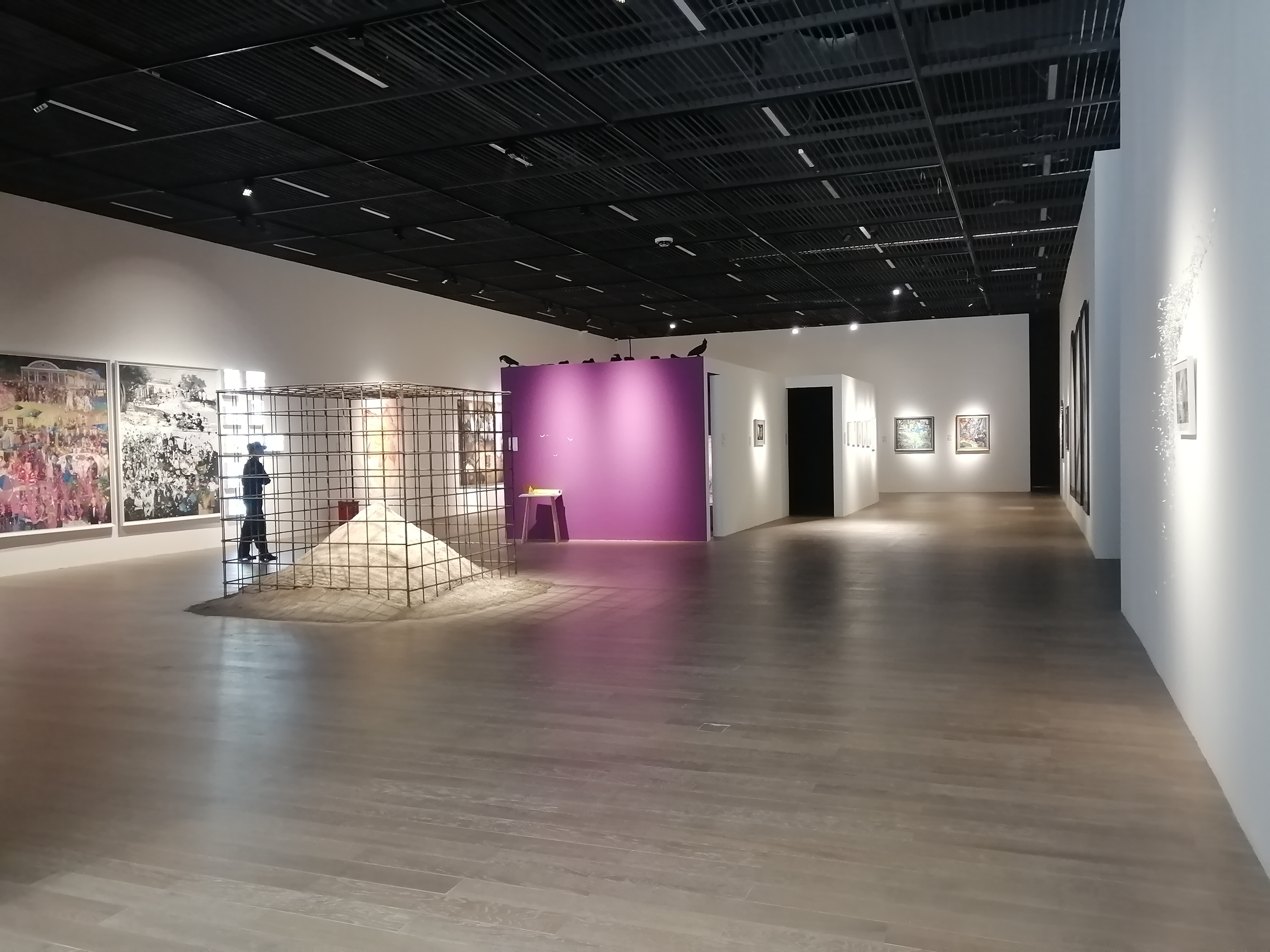
Gallery 13 of the museum

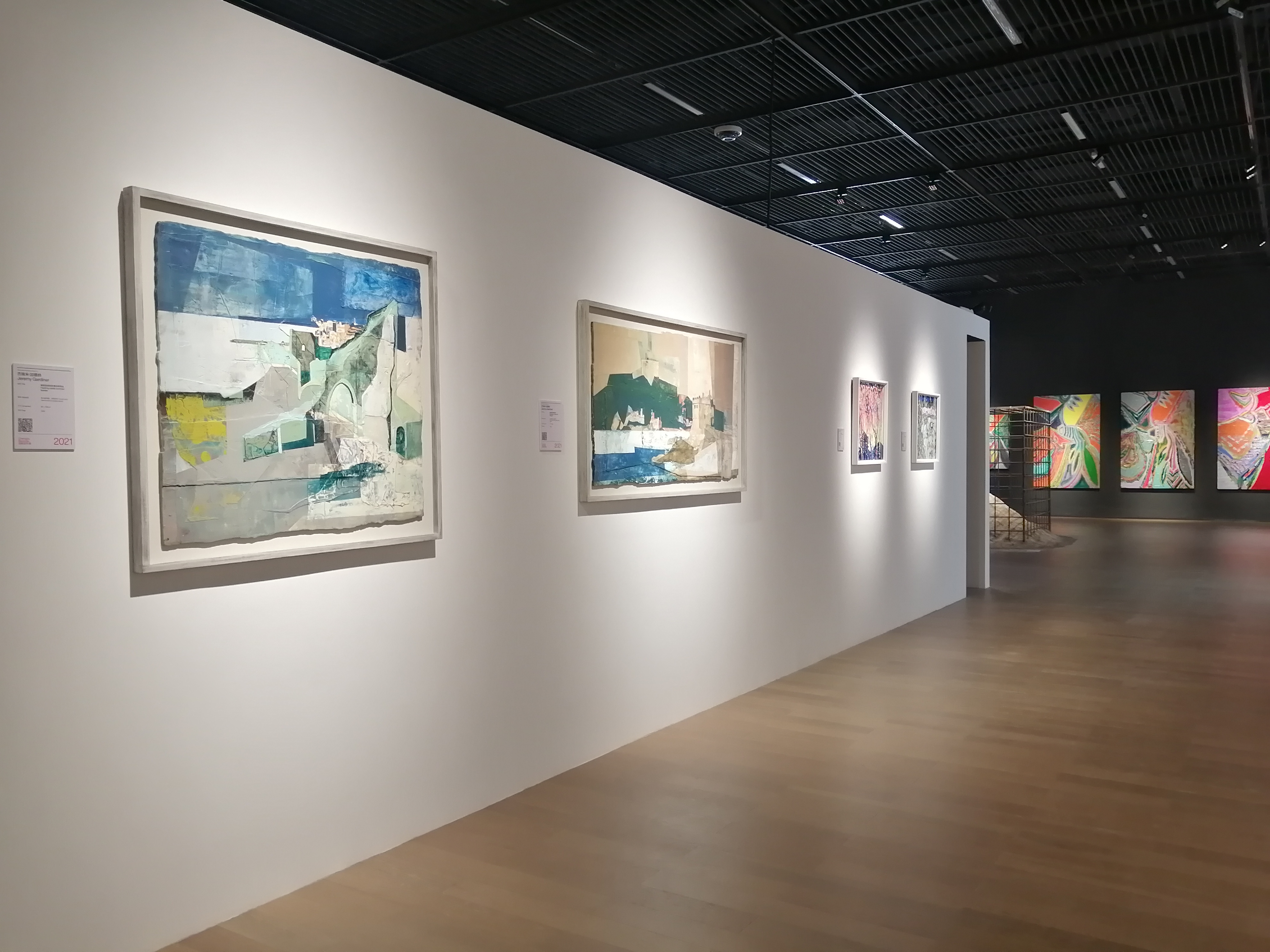
Works by Jeremy Gardiner in the museum as part of the 2021 Chengdu Biennale
