= Chengdu Culture Park =

Urban park in Chengdu, China

- 成都文化公园
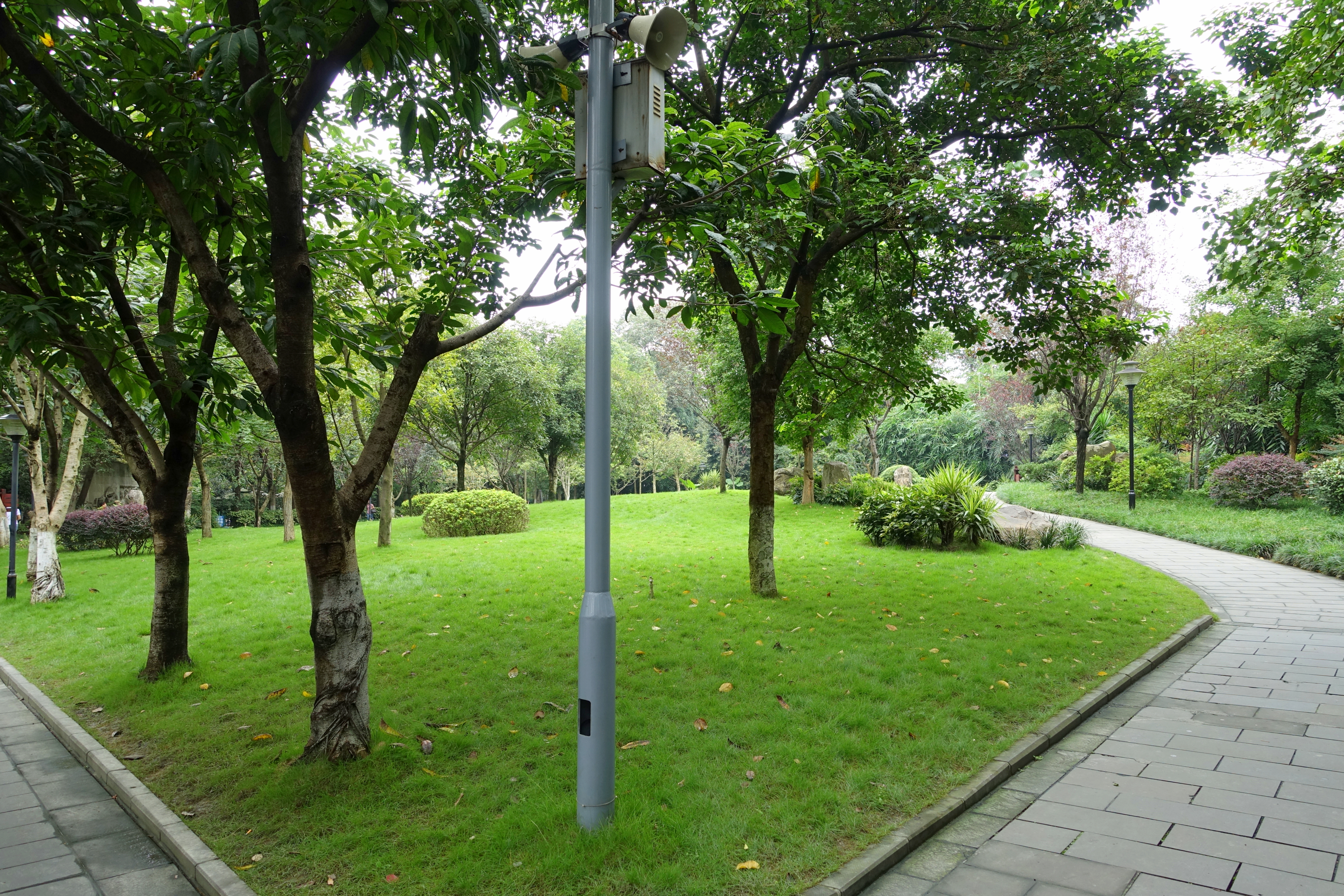
- View in the park
- Interactive map of Chengdu Culture Park
- Location: Chengdu, Sichuan, China
- Coordinates: 30.65973°N 104.04279°E
- Area: 71,326 m^{2} (767,750 sq ft)
- Opened: 1966
- Status: Public
- Designation: Urban park
- Facilities: Relief Art Wall; Shi'er Qiao Martyrs' Tombs

The Chengdu Culture Park (Chinese: 成都文化公园) is an urban park in the city of Chengdu, Sichuan, China.

The park is located at West Section 2, 1st Ring Road, near the Qingyang Taoist Temple and Wenjun Qintai Park. It covers 71,326 m^{2} with greenery, a lake, large stones, statues, a teahouse, and towers.

In the early 1950s, the city government created an avenue on paddy fields near Qingyang Temple to exhibit and trade flowers. Following the eighth flower exhibition, the avenue was converted into the Qingyang Temple Garden, with surrounding walls. In 1966, the park was renamed by the city government as the Chengdu Culture Park.

Features at the park include the Relief Art Wall, the Shi'er Qiao Martyrs' Tombs, and the Zhiji Rock and Octagonal Pavilion.

== See also ==
- Tianfu Art Park, Chengdu
