= Chengdu Museum of Contemporary Art =

Contemporary art museum in Chengdu, China

- 成都市当代艺术馆
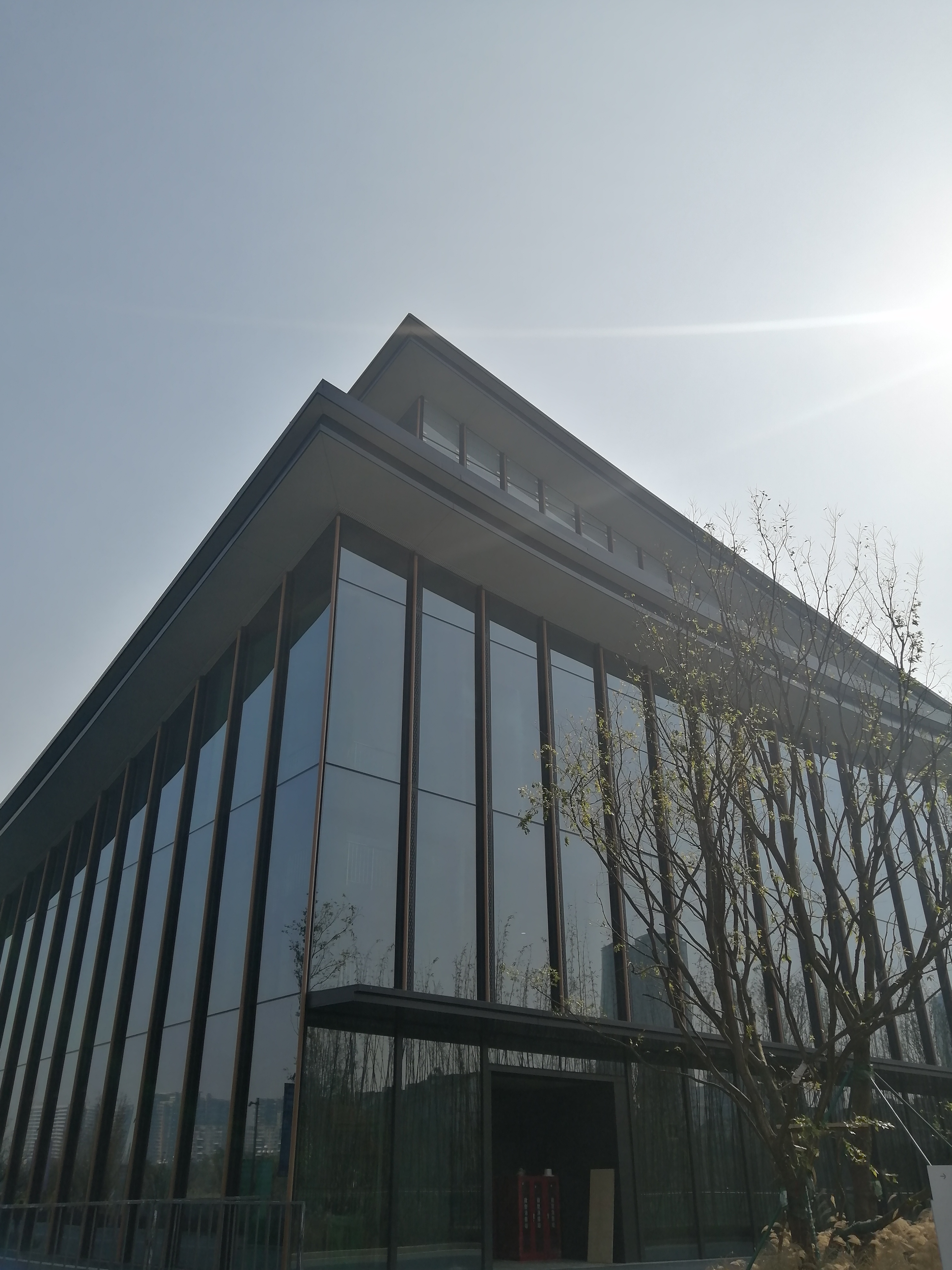
- A corner of the Chengdu Museum of Contemporary Art
- Established: November 6, 2021; 4 years ago
- Location: Tianfu Art Park, Jinniu District, Chengdu, Sichuan, China
- Coordinates: 30°42′44.01″N 104°01′04.54″E

The Chengdu Museum of Contemporary Art (Chinese: 成都市当代艺术馆) is a public municipal museum of contemporary art in Jinniu, Chengdu, Sichuan, China. It is owned and operated by the Chengdu Municipal People's Government.

== Overview ==
The museum opened in Tianfu Art Park as part of the 2021 Chengdu Biennale, together with the Chengdu Tianfu Art Museum. It is operated by the Chengdu Art Academy. The museum complex consists of three buildings; the others house an art library and a humanities library.

== Gallery ==
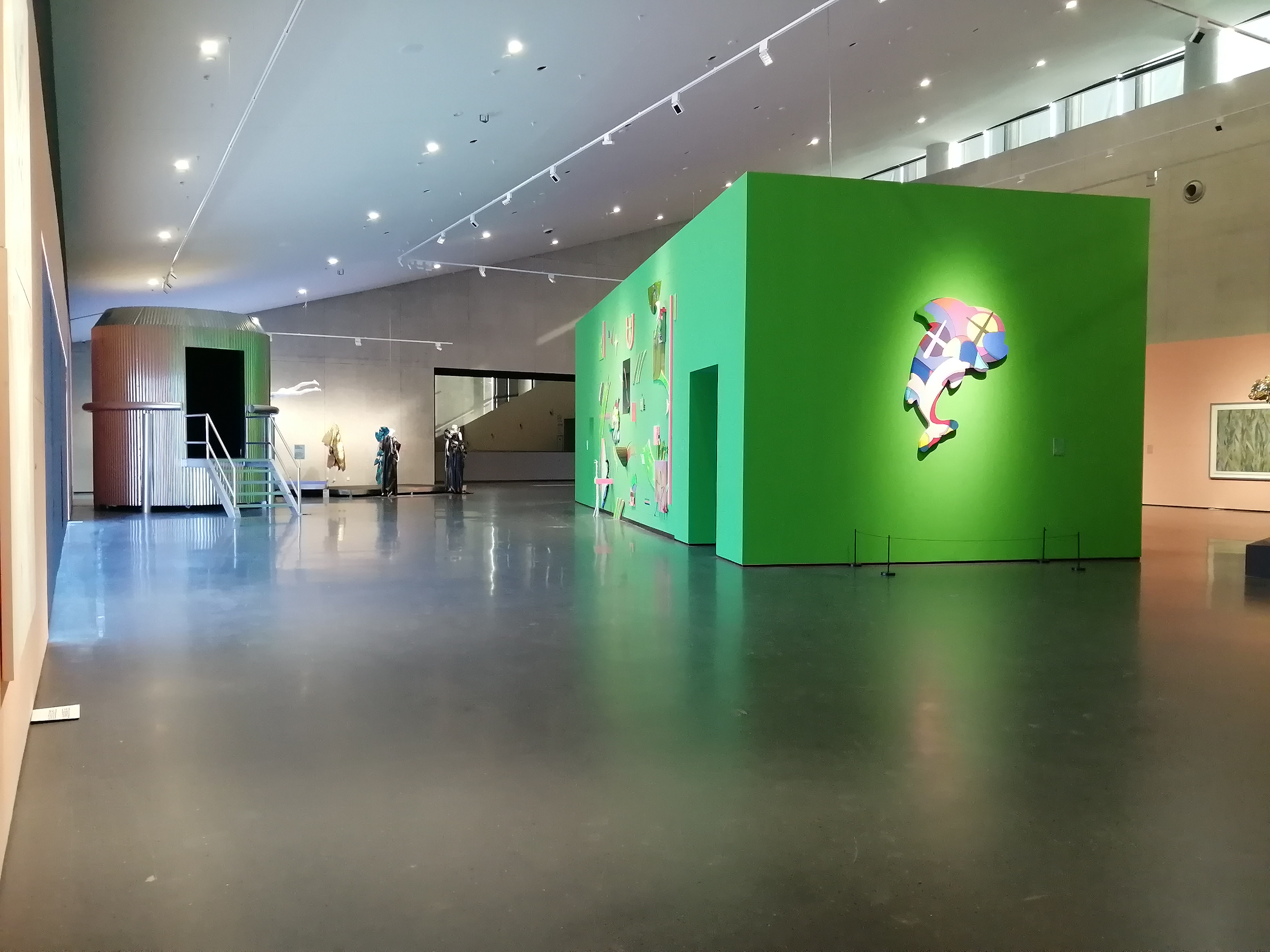
Inside the museum

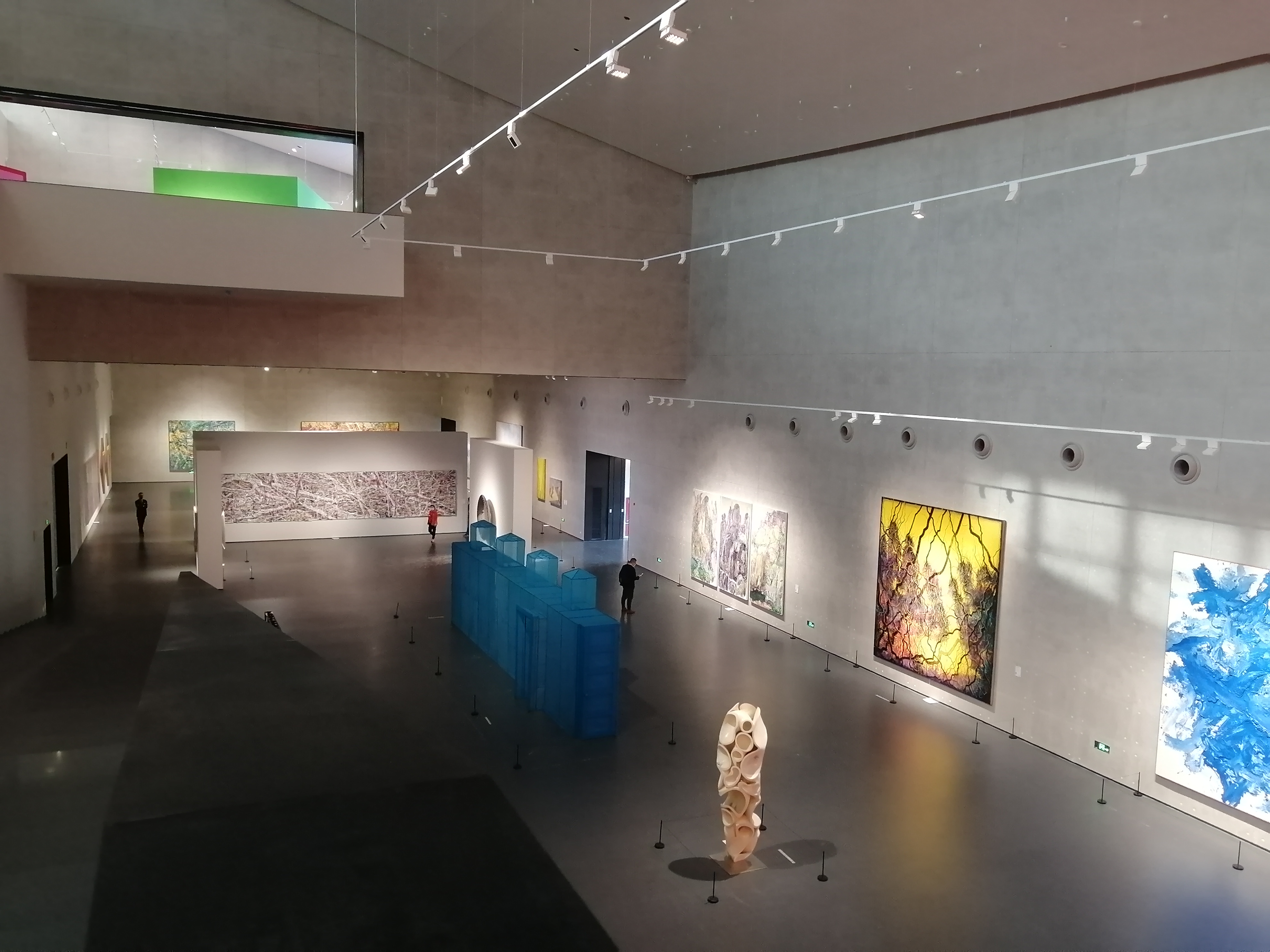
The ground floor of the museum

== See also ==
- List of libraries in China
