= Indica Gallery =

Counterculture art gallery

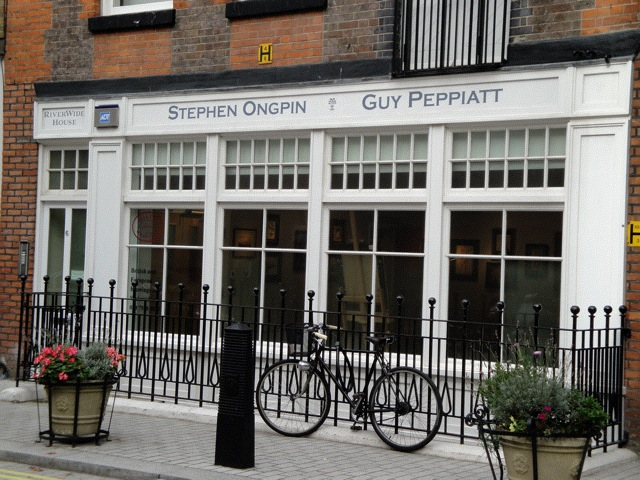
- The former Indica Gallery in Mason's Yard
- Established: November 1965
- Dissolved: November 1967
- Location: 6 Mason's Yard, St James's, London, SW1Y 6BU
- Coordinates: 51.507364°N 0.137737°W
- Type: Art gallery and bookshop
- Founder: Barry Miles; Peter Asher; John Dunbar

The Indica Gallery was a counterculture art gallery in Mason's Yard (off Duke Street), St James's, London from 1965 to 1967, in the basement of the Indica Bookshop. John Dunbar, Peter Asher, and Barry Miles owned it, and Paul McCartney supported it and hosted a show of Yoko Ono's work in November 1966, at which Ono met John Lennon.

== Indica Books and Gallery ==
Miles had been running the bookshop and alternative happenings venue Better Books but with new, more traditional, owners arriving, had been planning to open his own bookstore/venue. Through Paolo Leonni, Miles met John Dunbar who was planning on opening a gallery, and with John's friend Peter Asher as silent partner, they combined their ideas into a company called Miles, Asher and Dunbar Limited (MAD) to start the Indica Books and Gallery in September 1965, as an outlet for art and literature. They found empty premises at 6 Masons Yard, which was in the same courtyard as the Scotch of St James club, where John Dunbar was living with his girlfriend Marianne Faithfull, when he discovered the place. The name chosen for the bookshop/gallery was a reference to Cannabis indica.

== Yoko Ono and Beatles involvement ==
Card for the Unfinished Paintings art show by Yoko Ono at Indica Gallery

At the time, Paul McCartney was dating Asher's sister Jane Asher and living in the Asher family house at 57 Wimpole Street. He became involved with the emerging underground culture in London, and helped set up the bookshop and gallery. He was the Indica Bookshop's first customer, before it even had premises; he would look through the books at night that were stored in the Ashers' basement and leave a note for the books that he had taken to be put on his account. Artists such as Pete Brown also helped in the renovation of the Indica. Jane Asher donated the shop's first cash till, which was an old Victorian till that she had played with as a young girl. McCartney helped to draw the flyers which were used to advertise the Indica's opening, and he also designed the wrapping paper.

McCartney encouraged fellow Beatles member John Lennon to visit the gallery. On 7 November 1966, Lennon attended a preview evening of "Unfinished Paintings", a conceptual art exhibition by Yoko Ono that ran from 8–18 November. Co-owner John Dunbar had seen Ono’s performances of Cut Piece at the Destruction in Art Symposium in September and invited her to make an exhibition for the Indica Gallery. Ono was assisted in setting up the show by artist Adrian Hall, who was also present during Lennon’s visit. On seeing it, Lennon initially liked the artwork Apple and was impressed by the interactive Ceiling Painting/Yes Painting, which he found very positive. While Lennon and Ono claimed that this was the first time they met, this is disputed by Miles and others.

== Indica Bookshop ==
In the summer of 1966, the Indica Bookshop was separated from the Indica Gallery, and moved to 102 Southampton Row. The bookshop was opened on the site of an old and established bookseller and exporter called William Jackson Books Limited. Jackson's had decided to concentrate on the export side of its business and sold a twenty-year lease of the retail bookshop to Miles, Asher, and Dunbar. The name of the bookshop was promptly changed to Indica Books. Chris Hill and his wife Jo, who owned William Jackson Books, had taken a flat above the shop on Southampton Row and ran the export business from there. It soon proved to be a popular venue for the Indica Books team and the royalty of the 'swinging sixties' that were associated with them. John Lennon and Paul McCartney were visitors to the flat and on one evening, in 1966, they rehearsed a song they called "Mark I" in the flat. The song was later recorded at the Abbey Road Studios as "Tomorrow Never Knows" and included on the Revolver album.

The International Times newspaper was started in the basement of the Southampton Row bookshop.

== 2006 exhibition ==
An exhibition at Riflemaker (a gallery on Beak Street in London) in November 2006 revisited Indica 40 years after it was closed. It included work by the original artists including Liliane Lijn, Boyle Family/Mark Boyle and Carlos Cruz-Diez as well as a younger generation of artists whose work related to some of the ideas first presented there.

== See also ==
- Matthiesen Gallery, London

== Bibliography ==
- Harry, Bill (2002). The Paul McCartney Encyclopedia. Virgin Books. ISBN 0-7535-0716-1.
- Miles, Barry (1998). Paul McCartney: Many Years from Now. Vintage–Random House. ISBN 0-7493-8658-4.
- Miles, Barry (2002). In the Sixties. Jonathan Cape. ISBN 978-0-224-06240-4.
- Miles, Barry (2010). London Calling: A Countercultural History of London Since 1945. Atlantic Books. ISBN 978-184354-613-9.
