= Mason's Yard =

Square in the City of Westminster, London

Mason's Yard, St James's
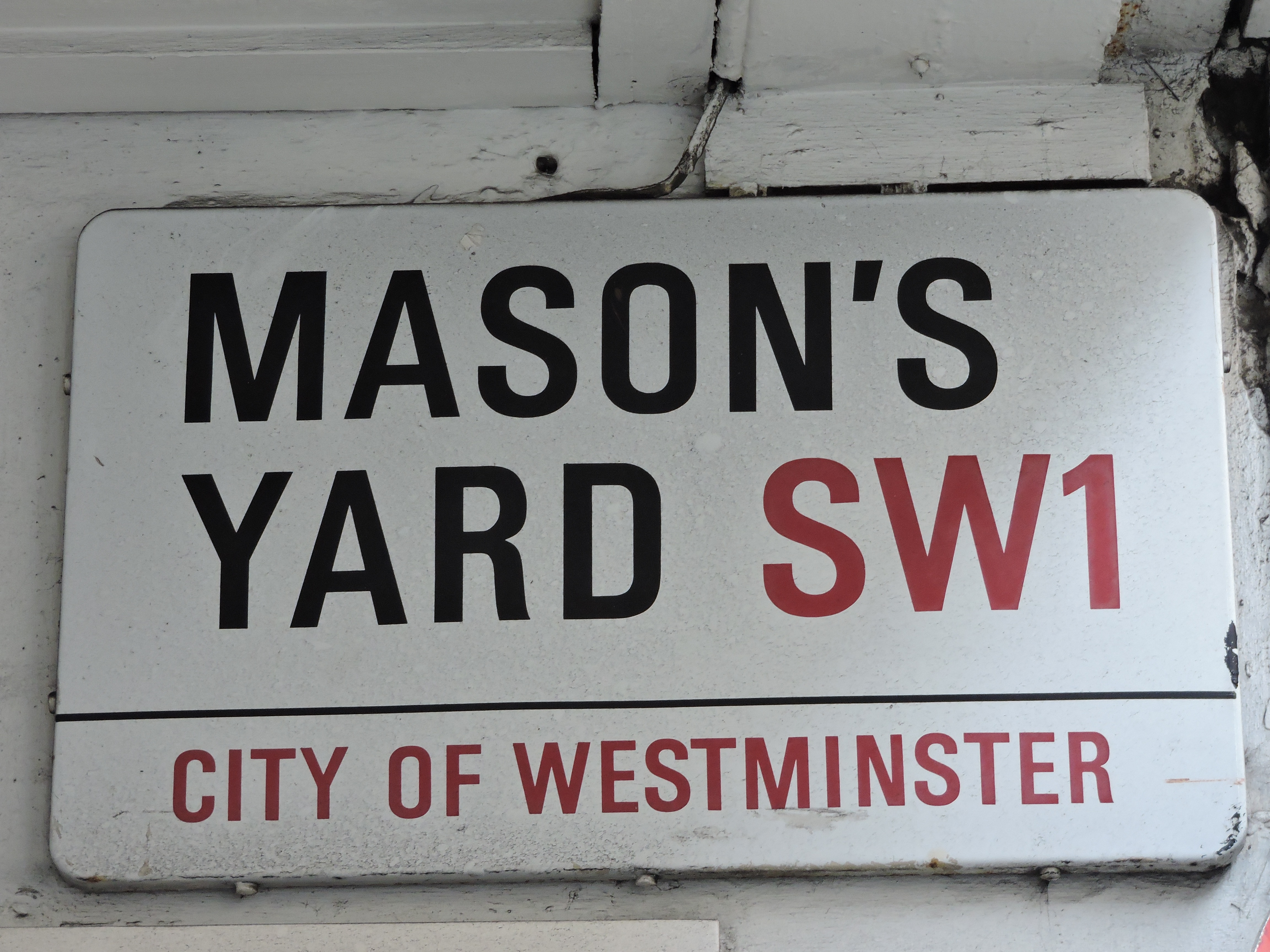
- Mason's Yard sign
- Interactive map of Mason's Yard, St James's
- Location: St James's, London, United Kingdom
- Postal code: SW1
- Nearest Tube station: Green Park
- Coordinates: 51.5075°N 0.1375°W
- North: Jermyn Street
- East: St James's Square
- South: King Street
- West: Duke Street

Other
- Known for: White Cube and other galleries

Mason's Yard is a square in London SW1, England.

== Overview ==
Mason's Yard is a square or cul-de-sac on the east side of Duke Street in the St James's area of London in the City of Westminster.

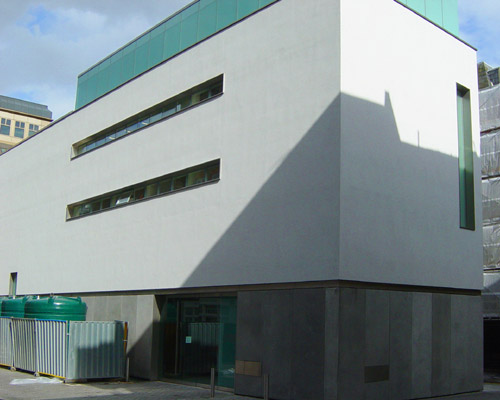
The White Cube gallery in Mason's Yard

White Cube has one of its two London galleries locations here, which opened in September 2006 at 25–26 Mason's Yard. The plot was previously occupied by an electricity substation.

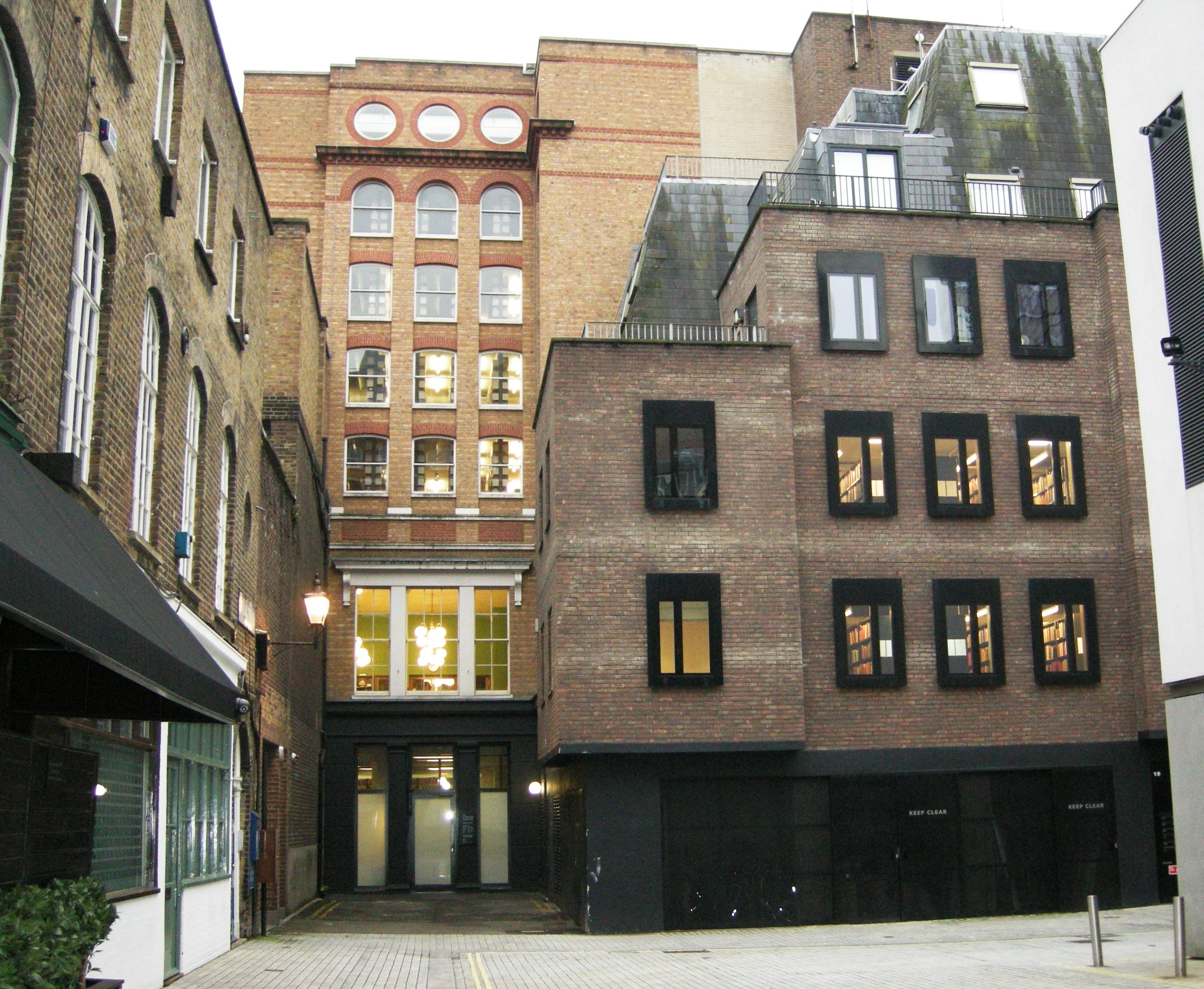
Back of the London Library at the southeast corner of Mason's Yard

The London Library is to the south and the Cavendish Hotel to the north on the corner of Duke Street and Jermyn Street.

== History ==
The original Ormond Yard was laid out as a 200 feet square plot. It was designed to be a stableyard. It was also formerly known as West Stable Yard. By 1740, the yard was known as Mason's Yard, probably because the owner of the two houses fronting onto both the yard itself and Duke Street was called Henry Mason, a victualler.

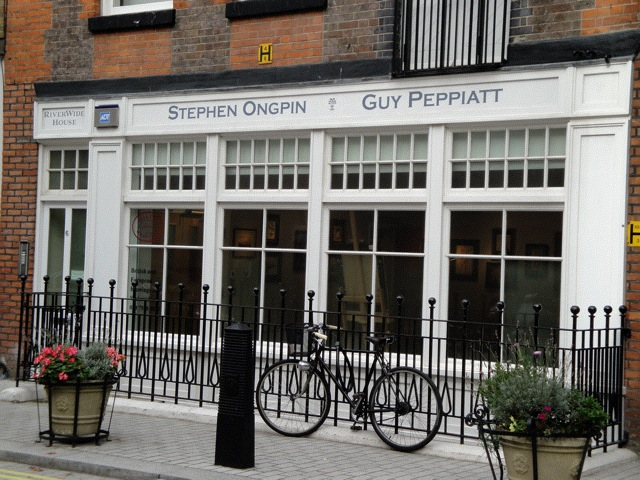
Location of the former Indica Gallery in Mason's Yard

The Indica Gallery was a counterculture art gallery at 6 Mason's Yard during 1965 to 1967, in the basement of the Indica Bookshop. John Dunbar, Peter Asher, and Barry Miles owned the gallery. Paul McCartney supported it and hosted a show of Yoko Ono's work in November 1966, at which Ono met John Lennon.

The Scotch of St. James is a nightclub and music venue, originally established in 1965 at 13 Mason's Yard. Jimi Hendrix performed here on the night of his arrival in England on 24 September 1966 and met Kathy Etchingham, who became his girlfriend. Gered Mankowitz photographed Jimi Hendrix in his studio at 9 Mason's Yard in 1967.

The Matthiesen Gallery, a leading dealership in Italian French and Spanish old master pictures, occupied No.6 dorm from 1978–1980, during which time they were involved in the development of the adjoining site, Nos 7–8, which was vacant. The resulting building was the first purpose built specialised private art gallery since WWII and was the location of numerous exhibitions from 1981 to 2009. The Gallery still occupies the site.

The Paisnel Gallery was previously located at 22 Mason's Yard, moving here from Fulham Road in the early 1990s. The site is now occupied by Alan Wheatley Art.
