= Tot Taylor =

Songwriter and author

- Born: Cambridge, England
- Genre: Music
- Occupations: Songwriter composer record producer author art curator
- Years active: 1973–present
- Website: Riflemaker Gallery Official website

Tot Taylor is an English, Cambridge-born, London-based songwriter, composer, record producer, author and art curator. He was a songwriter, singer, performer and band member throughout the 1970s, 1980s and 1990s as well as composer of film soundtracks and theatre scores including stage-productions for the UK's National Theatre. In 2003 he founded the Riflemaker Gallery in London with the curator Virginia Damtsa, which featured feminist, audio and performative art for galleries and museums.

His first novel, The Story of John Nightly, was published by Unbound/Penguin in 2017 and by Heyne Verlag/Random House in Germany in 2019.

== Early musical career ==
A songwriter/guitarist since the age of 7 and a pianist from 11, while still at school, Taylor's first group, A Special Moment, were signed to Chris Blackwell’s Island label to record the single "Let’s Socialize", though the record was never issued. Taylor then formed the group, Advertising, (Advert-i-sing) with guitarist Simon Boswell, releasing two singles and one album, Jingles, on EMI.

As a solo artist, Taylor then signed to Blackhill Enterprises (managers of Pink Floyd, Ian Dury and The Clash), releasing three singles and an album, Playtime, in 1981 for GTO/CBS Records under the name Tot Taylor and his Orchestra. His second solo album, The Inside Story, and two singles, "The Girl with Everything" and "Poptown", were released in 1983 (this time simply under the name Tot Taylor). He then released a further three albums over three years: Box-office Poison (1986), My Blue Period (1987) and Menswear Pt1 (1988), whilst also composing the song "Selling Out" for the 1986 David Bowie-starring, Julien Temple-directed film, Absolute Beginners and compiling the soundtrack for the films Dance with a Stranger and Alan Bleasdale's No Surrender.

During this period, Taylor began a career as a songwriter for other artists and founded the independent record label, The Compact Organization, which issued the debut album for the Swedish singer Virna Lindt, Shiver, (produced and co-written by Taylor and Lindt).

== Teddy Johns ==
Under the pseudonym ‘Teddy Johns’, Taylor wrote all the original compositions on Mari Wilson's debut album, Showpeople, which was released on Taylor and Paul Kinder's Compact Organization label and achieved a top 30 UK chart position. The album produced a UK chart top ten hit in "Just What I Always Wanted", reaching no.8 in 1982, as well as two other singles, "Baby, It’s True" and "Beware Boyfriend".

== Composing ==
Following his solo career, Taylor moved into theatre and film soundtrack scoring, relocating to Los Angeles, and working for the BBC as an arranger and composer. He composed six-hour's of piano score for the National Theatre's eight-hour production of the play Picasso's Women. The play was also staged in Edinburgh, toured the UK and Europe, returning to London in 2018. Other theatre scores include touring productions of Shakespeare’s The Tempest for the AJTC Theatre Company, and Charles Thomas's "Blood Royal" at the Kings Head Theatre, Islington, London.

Taylor has composed for film, television and video games, including Muela, Sparkhouse, The Grimleys, My Wonderful Life and Shatterer/Sicilian Connection. His compositions, production and compilation work have featured in the Tom Hardy-starring Kray twins film Legend, the Joaquin Phoenix film, Buffalo Soldiers Julien Temple’s Absolute Beginners, Mike Newell's Dance With a Stranger with Rupert Everett & Miranda Richardson, No Surrender and Mike Leigh's Career Girls.

For the BBC, Taylor composed and produced the soundtrack for the 12-part series Early Travellers in North America. He was the music director for a series of documentary films for the BBC about the recording process and how music is recorded: A Different Perspective (2001) on both Paul McCartney and Michael Stipe, directed by Kevin Macdonald. His music 'Trainer Trainers' was chosen to introduce Mobile Phones into the UK. He restored Beethoven's Moonlight Sonata for Prince Albert of Monaco and is an international D&AD-awarded composer (2003-2026) for his work in film.

== Instrumental work ==
Taylor has released two instrumental albums: Music for the Left Handed (with Mick Bass) and Waterland. He was the producer of a compilation album of modern interpretations of the music of Bach, entitled Bachology (EMI).

== Art curating and riflemaker gallery ==
In 2003, with Virginia Damsta, he co-founded the gallery Riflemaker in Beak Street in Soho (until 2018). The gallery was so-named because it was on the premises of a former gunmaker's workshop, Soho's oldest building (1715). The gallery has exhibited the work of William S. Burroughs, Juan Fontanive, Judy Chicago, Liliane Lijn, Gavin Turk, Jaime Gili, Marta Marce, Wen Wu, Penelope Slinger, Chosil Kil and Leah Gordon.

== Selected discography ==
=== Solo Records: (2020–2021) via Rough Trade ===
- "Yoko, Oh" (7" + 7" dinked vinyl) (2020) (The Campus via Rough Trade)
- "Featurette" (7" vinyl) (2020)
- "Baby, I Miss The Internet" (Donald's song) (7" + 12" vinyl) (2020)
- "I'll Go My Own Way" (7" vinyl) (2020
- "This New Abba Record" (7" vinyl) (2021)
- "Fortunes's Child" (7" vinyl) (2022)
- "Monster Ravin' Looney" (7" vinyl 2023) (The Campus via Rough Trade)
- "I Get My Kicks In NW6" (one-sided 7" vinyl 2024) on The Campus Label via Rough Trade)
- "I'm Incredibly Down" digital + via @RoughTrade – 2024 from the album HIGH STREET (2025)

=== The band Advert-I-Sing ===
- "Jingles" (1978) – album
- "Lipstick" (1977) – single
- "Stolen Love" (1977) – single

=== Solo albums ===
- "Playtime" (1981)
- "The Inside Story" (1983)
- "Box-office Poison" (1986)
- "My Blue Period" (1987)
- "Menswear" (1987)
- "Music For The Left-Handed" (1990) – with Mick Bass
- "Waterland" (1997)
- "Frisbee" (2021)
- "Studio Sounds" (2023)

=== Tot Taylor and the In-Group ===
- "PopFolkJazz" (2000)

=== Writer, composer, and producer ===
- "Shiver" (1984) by Virna Lindt (co-written/produced by Taylor)
- "Play/Record" (1985) by Virna Lindt (co-written/produced by Taylor)
- "Suburbia Suite" by The Sound Barrier (writer/producer)
- "St Marks Place" (1993) by World of leather (producer/co-writer)
- "Maria Callous" (1996) by Gretchen Hofner
- "Jesus Christ Superstore" (1995) by World of Leather (producer/co-writer)
- "Bachology" (1995) (producer)

=== Theatre and stage music ===
- ‘‘Picasso's Women’’ (National Theatre) (composer)
- ‘‘The Tempest’’ (AJTC Theatre) (composer)
- ‘‘Blood Royal’’ (King's Head Theatre) (composer)

=== Film and TV music ===
- ‘‘Shatterer’’ (1987) (composer)
- ‘‘Macbeth’’ (1998)
- ‘‘The Early Travellers’’ (1999) (composer/producer)

=== As 'Teddy Johns' ===
- ‘‘Showpeople’’ (1983) by Mari Wilson (writer and arranger) as ‘Teddy Johns’

=== Music for video games ===
- ‘‘Batman: Dark Tomorrow’’ (composer)

== Author ==
Taylor is the author of several books and monographs on artists and the visual arts including ‘Me as Him’ about the artists Gavin Turk and Andy Warhol, Analog (trends in Sound & Picture) and Indica, the story of the famous 1960s art space. His debut novel, the 900-page The Story of John Nightly was published by Unbound/Penguin Random House in the UK in 2017.

'The Story of John Nightly' featured in The Guardian 'Best novels of 2019' (Guardian Newspapers)
