= White Cube =

Contemporary art gallery

Coordinates: 51.4997°N 0.081864°W

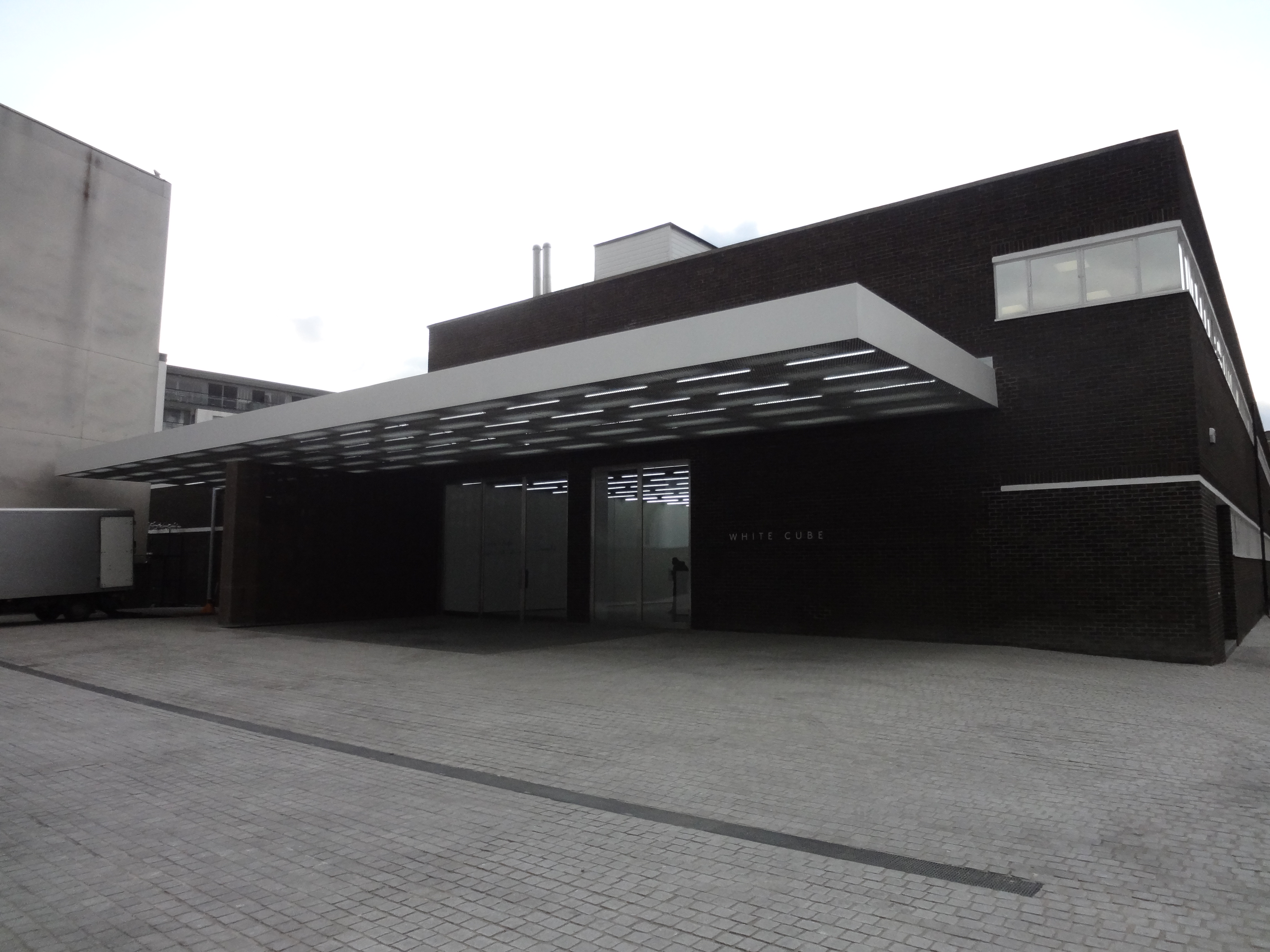
White Cube Bermondsey, London

White Cube is a contemporary art gallery founded by Jay Jopling in London in 1993. The gallery has two branches in London: White Cube Mason's Yard in central London and White Cube Bermondsey in South East London, as well as White Cube Hong Kong, in Central, Hong Kong Island; White Cube Paris, at 10 avenue Matignon in Paris; and White Cube Seoul, that opened in 2023 at 6 Dosan-daero in Seoul.

In October 2023, White Cube opened public gallery spaces and private viewing rooms in New York City's Upper East Side, in a three-floor building at 1002 Madison Avenue.

The Hoxton Square space in the East End of London closed at the end of 2012 and the São Paulo gallery in 2015. The West Palm Beach space in Florida closed at the end of 2023.

== History ==
=== Early beginnings ===
White Cube is a gallery owned and run by the art dealer Jay Jopling (an Old Etonian and son of a Conservative MP) who, until September 2008, was married to artist Sam Taylor-Wood. It first opened in May 1993 in a small, square room in Duke Street, St James's, a traditional art dealing street in the West End of London. In that location there was a gallery rule that an artist could only be exhibited once. The gallery gained its reputation by being the first to give one-person shows to many of the Young British Artists (YBAs), including Tracey Emin and Gavin Turk.

=== Hoxton Square 2000–2012 ===
In April 2000 it moved to 48 Hoxton Square, a 1920s building that had previously been occupied by the small publishing company Gerald Duckworth & Co. In 2002 an extra two stories (750 m^{2}) were added by hoisting a prefabricated unit on top of the existing structure.

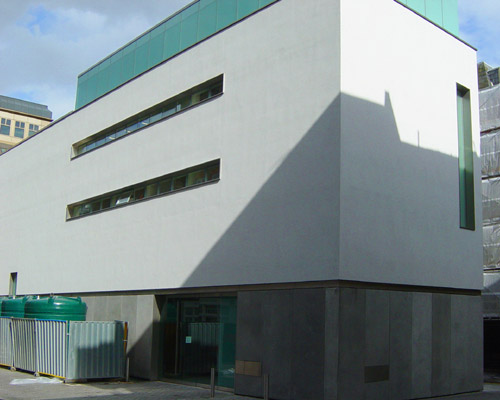
White Cube Mason's Yard, St. James's, London.

The Hoxton/Shoreditch area has been popular with the Young British Artists (YBAs) since the 1990s, at which time it was a run-down area of light industry. More recently it has undergone extensive redevelopment with clubs, restaurants and media businesses. Hoxton Square is a prime site with a central area of grass and trees, which the vicinity is mostly lacking.

White Cube previews were open to the public and crowds used to fill the square on such occasions. Its publicly accessible interior had a small reception area, which lead onto a 250-m^{2} exhibition area downstairs, two storeys in height. Another smaller exhibition space upstairs often showed a different artist. Offices and a conference room are on the upper floors. On some occasions exhibitions have been installed on the grass of the square, one example being Hirst's large sculpture (22 ft; 6.7 m) Charity, based on the old Spastic Society's model, which shows a girl in a leg brace holding a charity collecting box. White Cube Hoxton Square closed at the end of 2012.

White Cube also offers artists' editions.

=== St James's & Bermondsey ===
In September 2006 it opened a second site at 25–26 Mason's Yard, off Duke Street, St James's, home of the original White Cube gallery, on a plot previously occupied by an electricity sub-station. The 1,000 m^{2} (11,000 sq ft) gallery, designed by MRJ Rundell & Associates, is the first free-standing building to be built in the St James's area for more than 30 years.

In October 2011 White Cube Bermondsey was opened on Bermondsey Street. The building was formerly a 1970s warehouse and was converted into 5,400 m^{2} (58,000 sq ft) of interior space making it, at launch, Europe's biggest commercial gallery.

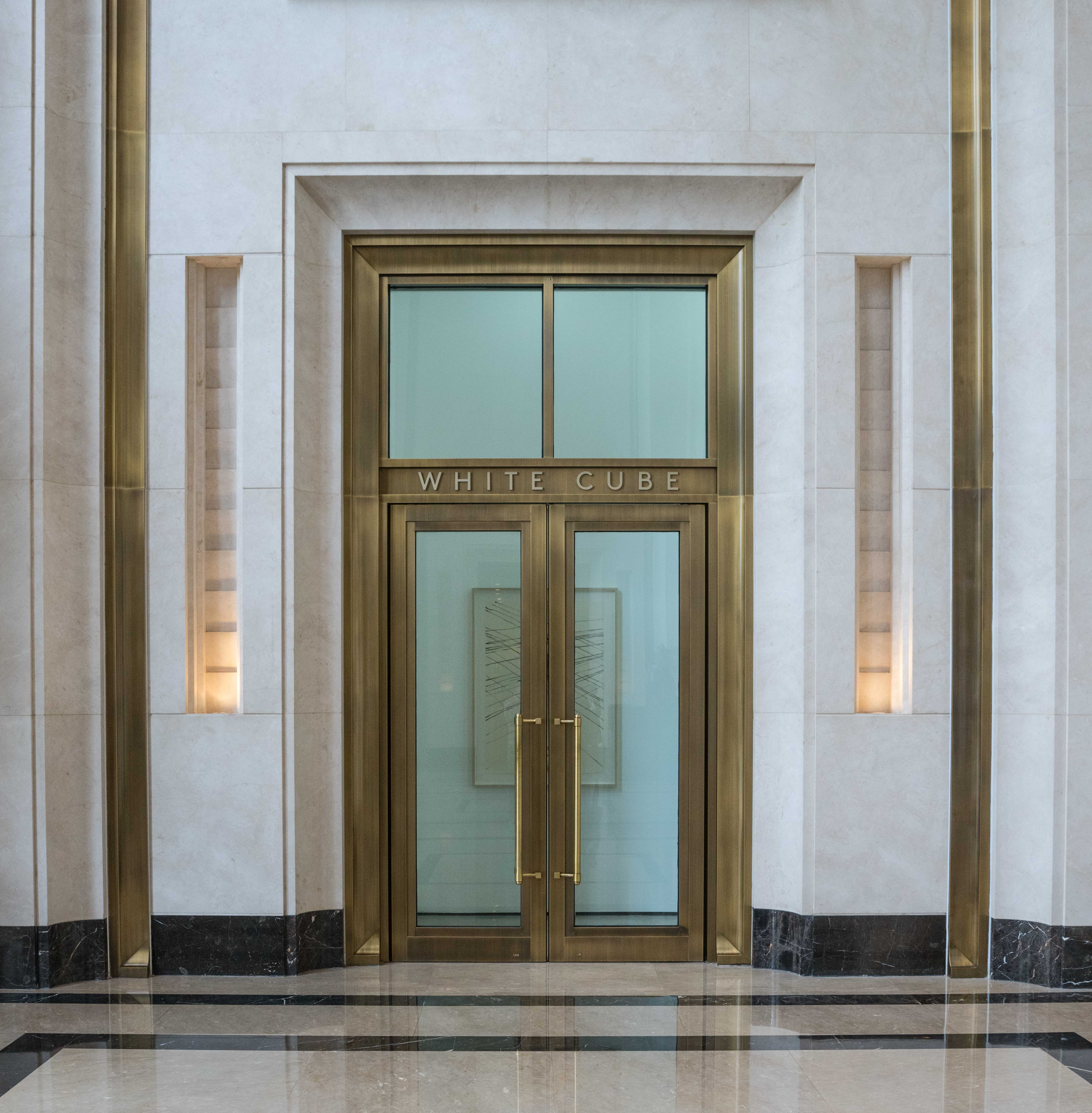
White Cube Hong Kong, Central

=== International expansion ===
White Cube Hong Kong opened in March 2012 at 50 Connaught Road, in the heart of Hong Kong's Central district. It was the first White Cube gallery located outside the UK. Many artists have exhibited there including Gilbert & George, Anselm Kiefer, Damien Hirst and Cerith Wyn Evans. The gallery presents in an internal exhibition space of 560 m^{2} (6,000 sq ft), which is set over two floors and has a ceiling height of over 4.5 metres. The space was designed by London-based architects Maybank and Matthews.

White Cube São Paulo opened in December 2012 in a converted warehouse in the centre of the city, on a three-year lease. The 460 m^{2} (5,000 sq ft) gallery launched after a one-off project in the space by Antony Gormley, organised in conjunction with the British artist's major exhibition at the Centro Cultural Banco do Brasil São Paulo in the summer of 2012. The gallery hosted a series of exhibitions by artists including Tracey Emin, Damien Hirst, Anselm Kiefer, Larry Bell and Theaster Gates. It closed in 2015.

In summer 2015, White Cube showed works from its stable of artists at the Glyndebourne Festival Opera in East Sussex – White Cube at Glyndebourne. The launch exhibition, held in a newly designed space created by the London-based architectural studio Carmody Groarke, featured a selection of paintings by the German artist Georg Baselitz.

In 2018 White Cube opened an office in Manhattan, which people could visit by appointment only. In 2019, the gallery set up a presence in the 8th arrondissement of Paris. By 2023, the gallery announced plans for a 300 m^{2} (3,230 sq ft) space in the Gangnam-gu neighbourhood of Seoul. The gallery is situated in the same building as the Horim Art Centre, notable for its extensive collection of Korean modern art and antiquities, in an attempt to align White Cube more closely with the existing Korean art scene and cultural heritage. White Cube opened its first New York City gallery on Madison Avenue in Manhattan in October 2023.

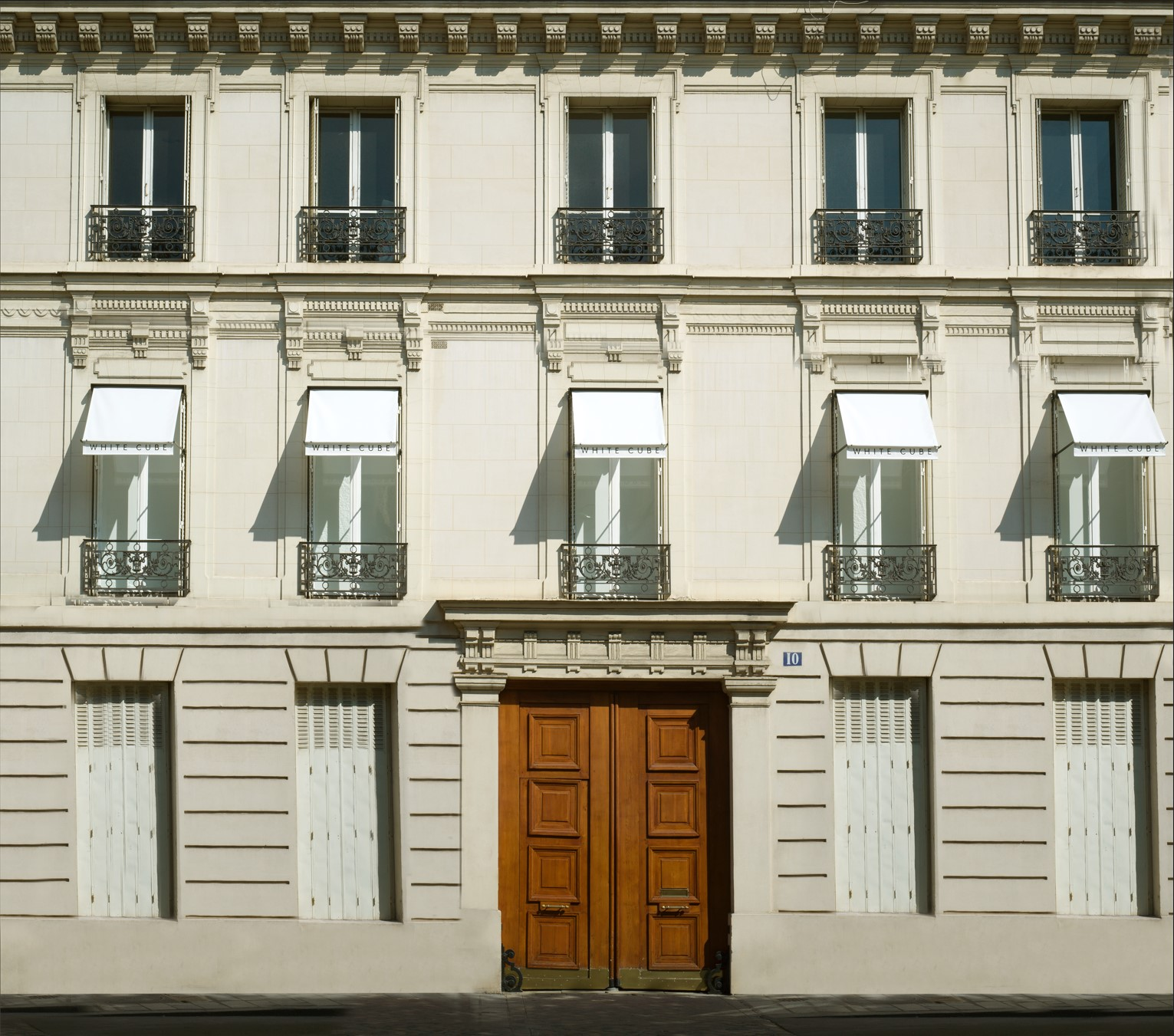
White Cube Paris, 10 avenue Matignon

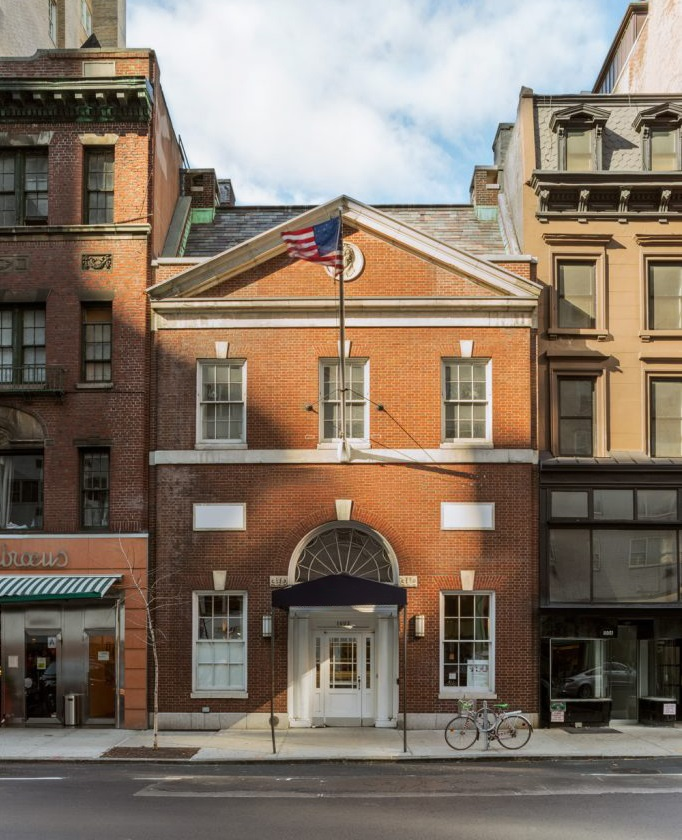
White Cube New York, 1002 Madison Avenue

== Artists ==
White Cube represents several living artists, including:

- David Altmejd (since 2018)
- Michael Armitage
- Christine Ay Tjoe (since 2018)
- Georg Baselitz
- Julie Curtiss (since 2020)
- Tracey Emin
- Cerith Wyn Evans
- Theaster Gates (since 2011)
- Gilbert & George
- Antony Gormley
- Louise Giovanelli (since 2022)
- David Hammons
- Mona Hatoum
- Damien Hirst
- Anselm Kiefer
- Rachel Kneebone
- Ibrahim Mahama
- Dóra Maurer
- Tiona Nekkia McClodden (since 2023)
- Julie Mehretu
- Beatriz Milhazes (since 2020)
- Sarah Morris
- Gabriel Orozco
- Virginia Overton
- Eddie Peake
- Howardena Pindell (since 2024)
- Doris Salcedo
- Cinga Samson
- Raqib Shaw
- Danh Vo (since 2018)

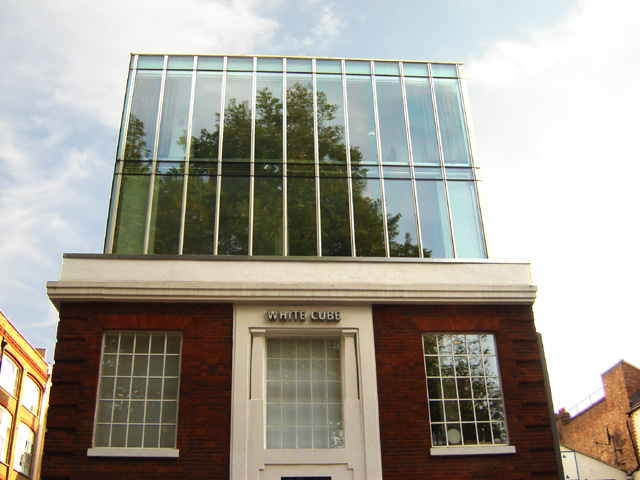
The now-defunct White Cube in Hoxton Square, which closed in 2012

In addition, the gallery manages various artist estates, including:

- Bram Bogart (since 2019)
- Lynne Drexler (since 2023)
- Al Held (since 2018)
- Richard Hunt (since 2023)
- Isamu Noguchi (since 2021)
- Takis (since 2020)

White Cube has in the past represented other artists, including:

- Jake and Dinos Chapman (1999–2017)
- Itai Doron
- Gary Hume
- Marc Quinn
- Marcus Taylor
- Gavin Turk

== Criticism ==
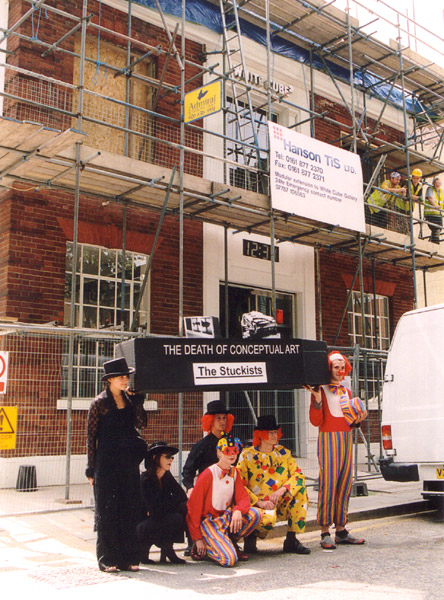
Stuckist artists demonstrate outside White Cube Hoxton, July 2002. The scaffolding was in place to add extra floors.

In 1999, the Stuckists art group declared themselves "opposed to the sterility of the white wall gallery system", and opened their own gallery (with coloured walls) in street adjoining White Cube. On another occasion in 2002, while dressed as clowns, they deposited a coffin marked "The Death of Conceptual Art" outside the White Cube's door.

In 2011 an anonymous group of net artists launched a website under the domain name, whitecu.be, as, among other ideas, an experimental institutional critique of authorship and trademark practices. Growing in popularity and momentum toward the end of 2011, the site was deleted by the DNS.be authorities after receiving a cancellation request from White Cube's lawyers. The artists transformed the subsequent legal correspondence into 19 standalone artworks.

In 2015 the gallery was targeted by anti-gentrification activists who graffitied "Yuppies Out" and "Class War" onto the wall of an apartment near the gallery.

The White Pube duo of critics chose their name in criticism of the white cube style in general, and of the London gallery.

== See also ==
- Brian O'Doherty, writer on white cube philosophy
