= Wen Wu =

Wen Wu or Wenwu may refer to:

== People ==
- Wen Wu (artist) (born 1978), a Chinese painter based in London
- Kublai Khan (1215–1294; Emperor Shèngdé Shéngōng Wénwǔ), an emperor of the Mongol Empire
- Wen Wu Ding (fl. 12th century BCE), a king of the Shang dynasty

=== Fictional characters ===
- Wenwu, a fictional character in the Marvel Cinematic Universe film franchise

== Other uses ==
- Wen and wu, a conceptual pair in Chinese philosophy and political culture describing opposition and complementarity of civil and military realms of government
- Wen Wu temple, a dual temple in China venerating the two patron gods of civil and martial affairs in the same temple complex
