= Bury Street =

Street in St James's, London

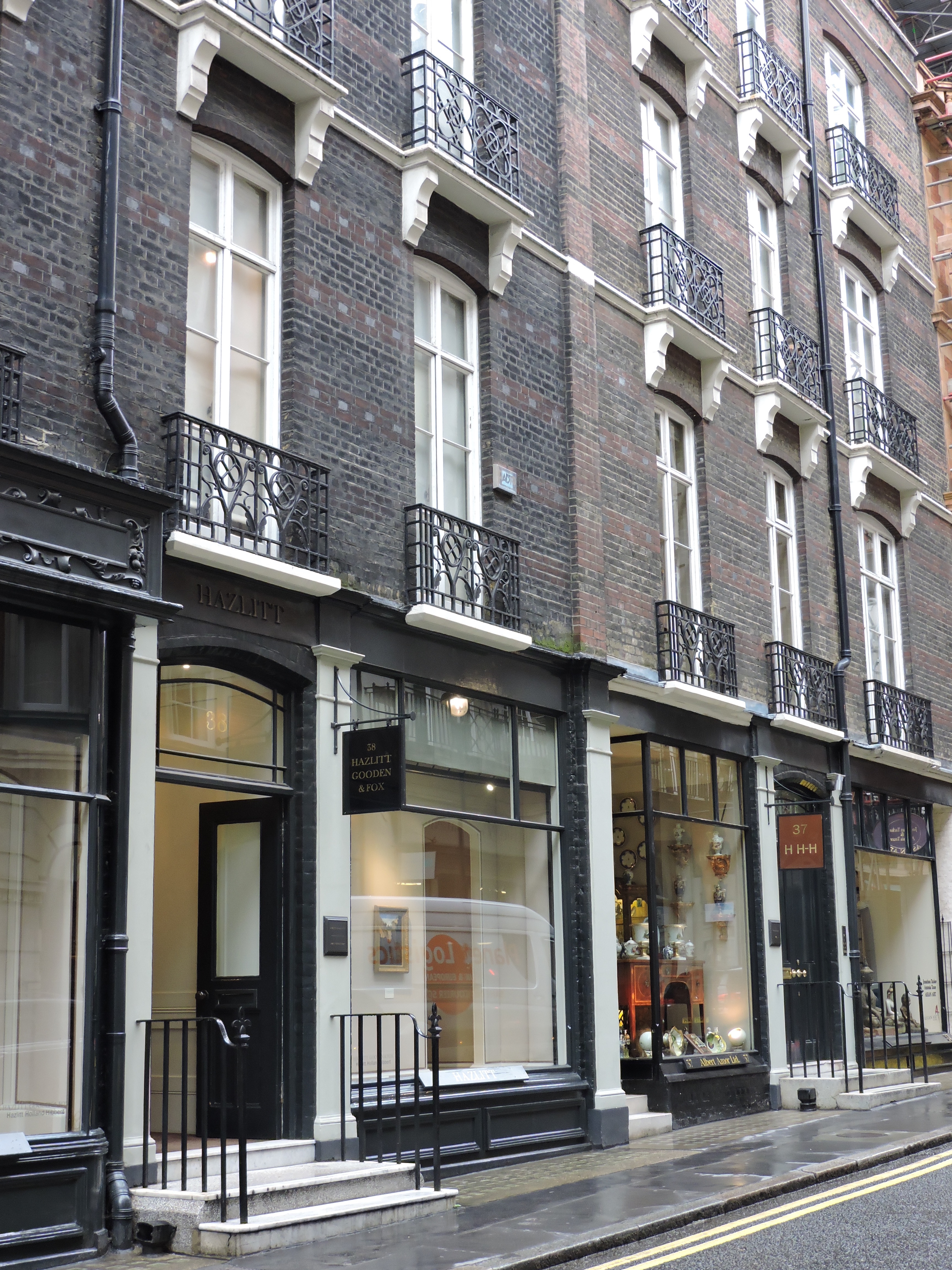
- West side of Bury Street
- Interactive map of Bury Street
- Length: 0.16 km (0.099 mi)
- Location: St James's, London, United Kingdom
- Postal code: SW1Y
- Nearest Tube station: Green Park
- Coordinates: 51.506930°N 0.138615°W
- North: Jermyn Street
- South: King Street

Other
- Known for: Art Galleries and Restaurants

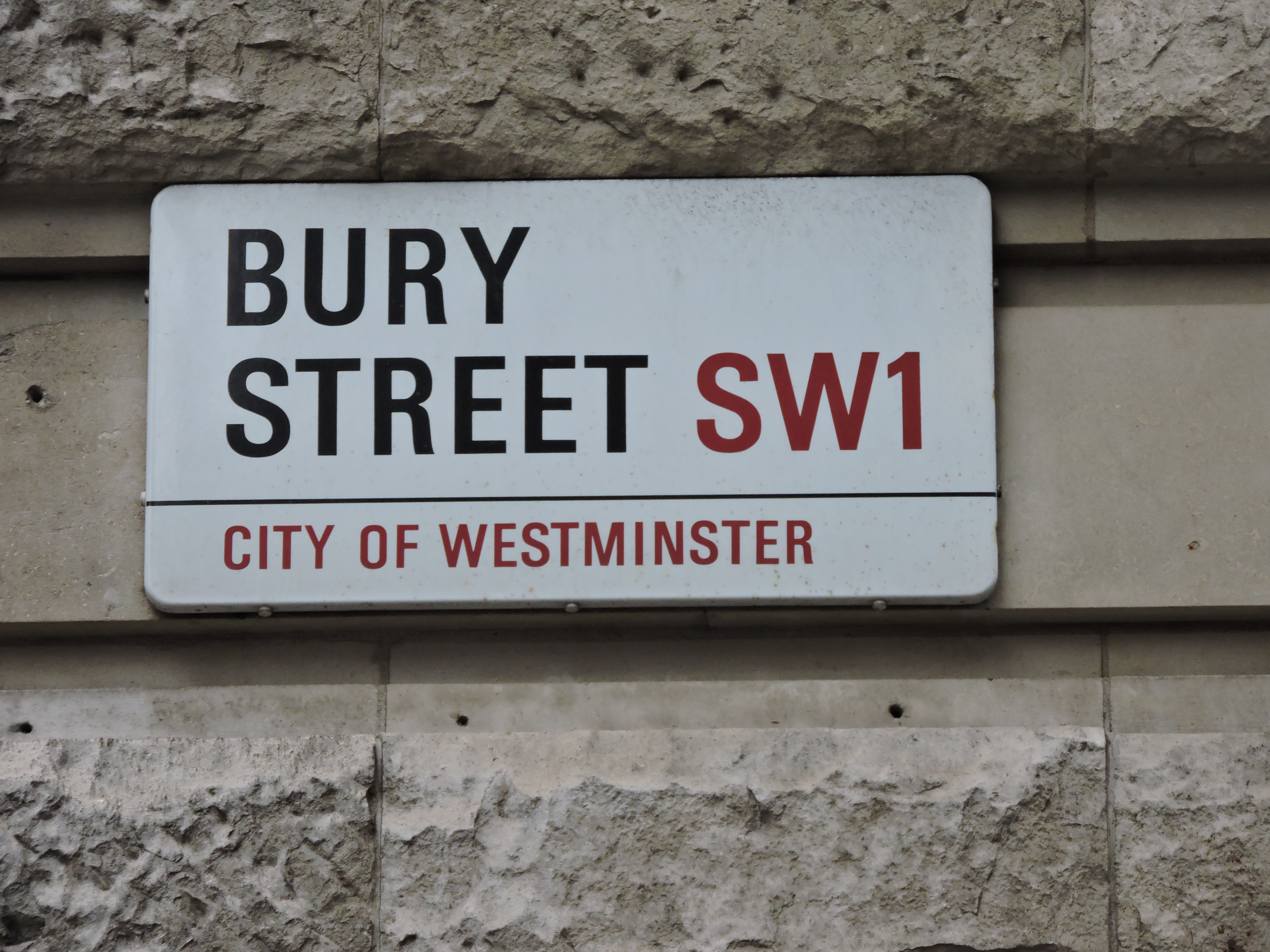
Street sign for Bury Street

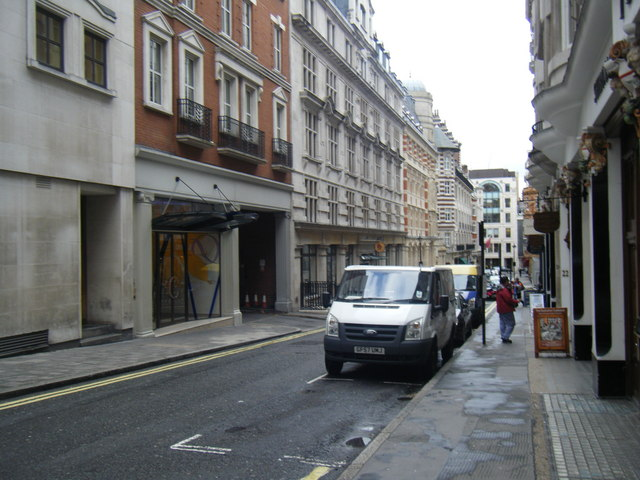
Bury Street, 2009

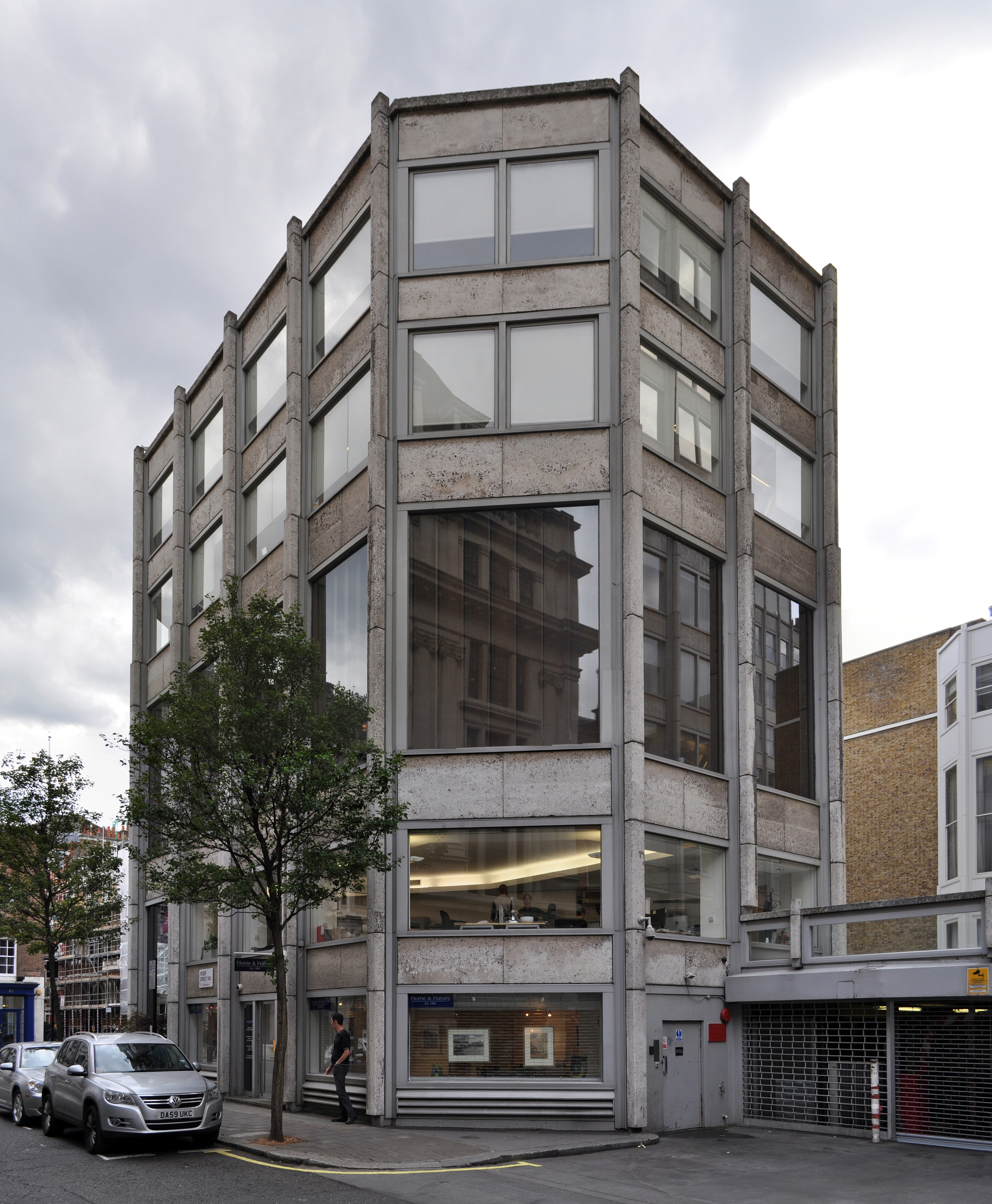
One of the Economist Buildings, seen from the direction of Bury Street

Bury Street is a one-way street in St James's, London SW1. It runs roughly north-to-south from Jermyn Street to King Street, and crosses Ryder Street.

== Street history ==
Probably taking its name from Bury St Edmunds, Rushbrooke, the country seat of the Jermyn family, was near that town, and from 1643 until his advancement to an earldom in 1660, St. Albans was Baron Jermyn of St. Edmundsbury. The street first appears by name Berry Street in the rate books of St Martins in 1673, 11 names were recorded.

On 23 February 1755 Horace Walpole described a fire in Bury Street. A newspaper at the time reported: "Yesterday morning [20 Feb.], about five o'clock, a fire broke out at Mr Thompson's, an embroiderer in Bury Street, St James's, which entirely consumed the same, and damaged several other houses adjoining" (The Daily Advertiser, 21 February 1755).

The freehold of the street belongs to The Crown Estate.

== Notable residents ==
Notable residents have included writer Jonathan Swift, writer and politician Richard Steele, William Brummell father of Beau Brummell, the statesman Charles Jenkinson, 1st Earl of Liverpool, Irish poet Thomas Moore and poet George Crabbe.

In Swift's A Journal to Stella, he wrote "Tomorrow I change my lodgings to Bury Street". (Letter 3, London, 9 September 1710).

== Listed buildings ==
There are two listed buildings in Bury Street:

- No 21–24 Bury Street on the corner of Jermyn Street. Corner building of chambers and shops. Dated 1903, by Reginald Morphew, sculpture by Gilbert Seale.
- No 37–38 Bury Street. Residential Chambers with art galleries below, by the architect William Butterfield (1814–1900).

There are also the Economist Buildings, which occupy an area from St James's Street to Bury Street (Nos 28–30d), London, SW1. Built by Alison and Peter Smithson between 1962 and 1964, in the New Brutalist Style.

== Notable businesses ==
Although a relatively short street (160 meters), there are several businesses, most notably art dealers, including Old Master dealers, Hazlitt, Gooden & Fox, at No 38 and Colnaghi at No 26, modern and contemporary art dealers, The Nine British Art is located at No 9. There are also art galleries showing silver, Asian and Islamic art and print and illustrations.

The restaurant Quaglino's is at No 16, and the Japanese restaurant Matsuri St James's at No 15.

Christie's, a historic British auction house founded in 1766, has its main premises in a large building with its main entrance on King Street to the south and also bordering onto the east side of Bury Street.
