= Apple (artwork) =

Artwork by Yoko Ono

Apple is a 1966 conceptual artwork by the Japanese artist Yoko Ono. The work is classified as Temporary art.

== Work ==
The work consists of an apple on top of a plexiglass stand. A brass plaque bearing the word 'APPLE' is fixed to the front of the stand. The piece was subsequently covered in bronze as part of Ono's 'Bronze Age' series of artworks.

== History ==
The work was shown at Ono's autumn 1966 show, Unfinished Paintings and Objects By Yoko Ono at the Indica Gallery in London. The preview night of Ono's Indica exhibition on 9 November 1966 was visited by the musician John Lennon who had heard that "this amazing woman was going to be putting on a show...and it was going to be a bit of a happening". Lennon described himself as "astounded" at the "apple on sale for two hundred quid; I thought it was fantastic—I got her work immediately...it was two hundred quid to watch the fresh apple decompose". The piece also appealed to Lennon as he "didn't have to have much knowledge about avant-garde or underground art... the humor got me straight away". Lennon took a bite out of the apple on display, before apologising and putting the apple back. Ono later recalled that "...he just grabbed it and bit it and looked at me like, you know, "There!" you know? I was so furious, I didn't know what to say. And it all showed in my face: How dare this person, you know, mess around with my work?". Lennon was subsequently impressed by his interaction with Ono's piece Ceiling Painting/Yes Painting.

Apple was recreated for the first time in four decades in 2006 at a recreation of the Indica Gallery at the art gallery Riflemaker in London's Soho district. The original Indica had closed in 1967. The piece was displayed at Ono's 2015 retrospective, Yoko Ono: One Woman Show, 1960–1971 at the Museum of Modern Art in New York City. Critic Bruce Handy highlighted Apple as one of the "must see" pieces from the exhibition, and believed the apple itself to be of the Granny Smith cultivar.

== Interpretation ==
In 1966, Ono described the "...excitement of watching the apple decay, and the decision as to whether to replace it, or just thinking of the beauty of the apple after it's gone". Bruce Handy wrote that the accompanying label for Apple highlighted for the viewer the juxtaposition between the physical permanence of the pedestal's brass plaque and the "passage of time marked by the apple's decay and periodic renewal as it is replaced throughout the course of the exhibition" a relationship that begins as "the transparent base recedes into space".
