= Kathy Etchingham =

British writer (born 1946)

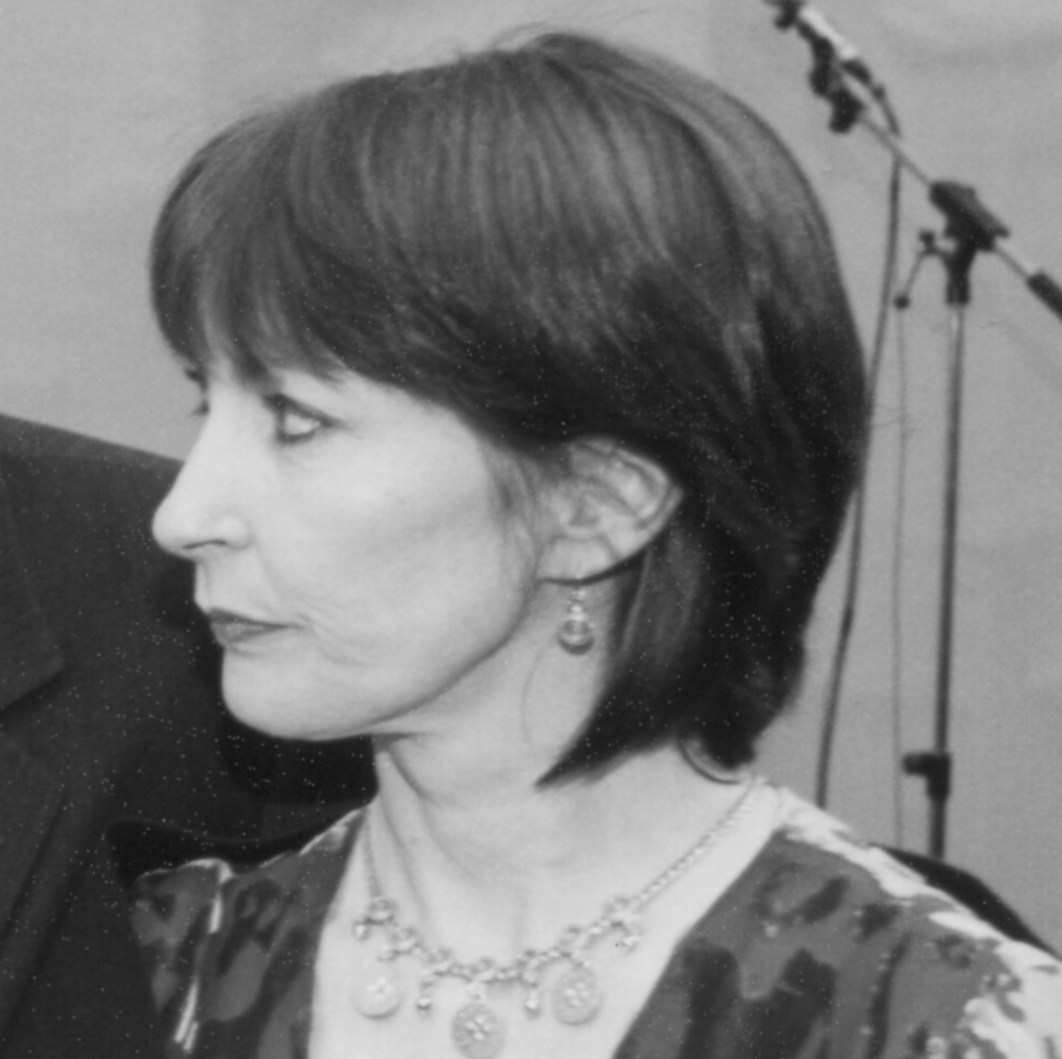
- Kathy Etchingham at Jimi Hendrix; Blue Plaque unveiling
- Born: Kathleen Mary Etchingham; 18 June 1946 (age 80); Derby, England
- Occupation: Author
- Partner: Jimi Hendrix (1966–1969)
- Children: William Page

Kathleen Mary Etchingham (born 18 June 1946) is an English writer known from the Swinging London music scene of the 1960s and for her relationship with Jimi Hendrix.

== Early life ==
Etchingham was born in Derby, the daughter of Charles Etchingham, an Irishman from Dublin. Her mother deserted the family when Kathy was 10 years old, and Kathy was sent to the Holy Faith convent boarding school in Skerries, County Dublin. Returning to England, having been snatched from the convent by her mother, she eventually made her way to London.

== 1960s London ==
In London, Etchingham became a DJ at The Cromwellian in Kensington and later at the Scotch of St James in Mason's Yard, in addition to working as a hairdresser. She knew the up-and-coming musicians of the period including The Animals, The Who, The Kinks, The Moody Blues, The Move, and many others. These bands became known in the US in the mid-1960s as the British Invasion.

Etchingham met Jimi Hendrix in The Scotch of St. James nightclub, on the night of his arrival in London on 24 September 1966, when she was 20. They became a couple during the time of his rise to stardom. According to her personal web page, Etchingham was the inspiration for many of Hendrix's compositions including "The Wind Cries Mary" (penned after an argument between Hendrix and Etchingham), "Foxy Lady" (during one of the first performances of this number Hendrix pointed her out from the stage), as the Katherina in "1983... (A Merman I Should Turn to Be)" and in "Send My Love to Linda" (the original lyrics of which were "Send My Love to Kathy", until Etchingham objected to being named). In 1968, she and Hendrix drifted apart.

== Later life ==
Etchingham's first marriage broke up, and she later remarried and had a family. In 1997, she was instrumental in the placement of an English Heritage blue plaque on the wall of Jimi Hendrix's home at 23 Brook Street, Mayfair. In 1998, she published a book, Through Gypsy Eyes, which Etchingham wrote with Andrew Crofts, about her life, the 1960s, and Jimi Hendrix.

I want him to be remembered for what he was – not this tragic figure he has been turned into by nit-pickers and people who used to stalk us and collect photographs and "evidence" of what we were doing on a certain day. He could be grumpy, and he could be terrible in the studio, getting exactly what he wanted – but he was fun, he was charming. I want people to remember the man I knew.

In 2014, Etchingham criticised the biographical film which covered her relationship with Hendrix in the 1960s, Jimi: All Is by My Side, written and directed by John Ridley. Etchingham described the film depiction of her life with Hendrix as "absolute nonsense".
