= Hazlitt, Gooden & Fox =

British art dealers

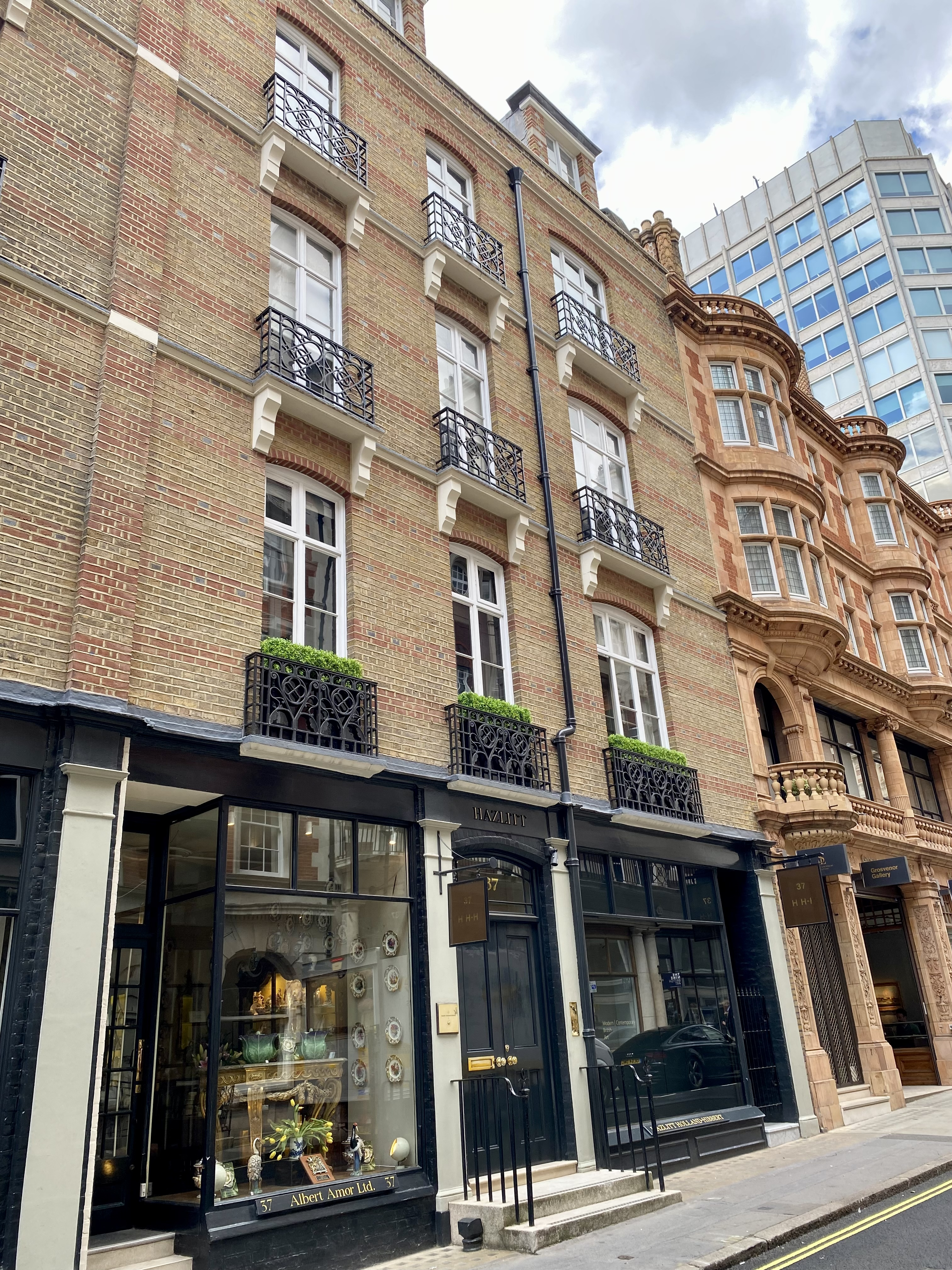
- Hazlitt Gallery at 38 Bury Street, London
- Company type: Private limited company
- Industry: Art dealer
- Founded: 1752
- Headquarters: 38 Bury Street, St James's, London SW1Y 6BB, United Kingdom
- Area served: Worldwide
- Key people: Jack Baer
- Website: hazlittgoodenandfox.com

Hazlitt, Gooden & Fox, based at 38 Bury Street, London, England, is a firm of British art dealers, specialising in Old Master paintings and drawings.

The company was founded in 1752. In 1948, Jack Baer took over the running of the Hazlitt Gallery, and built it into "a world-class concern", and in 1973, a merger created Hazlitt Gooden & Fox, opening a New York affiliate gallery.

Artworks handled by the company are now in major collections, such as the Getty and the National Gallery of Art.
