= Artists Anonymous =

German and British art group

- Education: Berlin University of the Arts
- Notable work: Apocalyptic Warriors, Virus, The fictitious blowing up of the Hamburger Bahnhof

Artists Anonymous are an art group based in Berlin and London. They were founded in 2001 during their studies at Berlin University of the Arts (UdK) at the classes of Georg Baselitz and Stan Douglas. They finished studying in 2006.

Since 2005 they have exhibited in different international galleries like Sommer Contemporary Art, Tel Aviv, Christian Ehrentraut, Berlin, Goff+Rosenthal, Berlin/NY.

In 2006, one of the big diptychs from the series Apocalyptic Warriors was bought by Charles Saatchi.

In 2007, instead of collaborating with art galleries, they converted an old garage space in London, Vyner Street to a showroom and ran their own gallery. During this time several of their works were sold to the Deutsche Bank Collection. By the end of 2007 the opening of their second space in Berlin, Heidestrasse, followed, where one big installation (the gunslinger and other true stories) took place.

Since then a number of different shows and project took place such as:

- Frieze Art Fair, VIP Lounge of Deutsche Bank Collection, London
- Virus at Haunch of Venison
- "The fictitious blowing up of the Hamburger Bahnhof" at Hamburger Bahnhof, Berlin
- "Communication and Association" at A Foundation, Liverpool, as part of the Liverpool Biennial 2008
- Bioshock at Ron Mandos Gallery, Amsterdam
- Play the City, at Schirn Kunsthalle Frankfurt
- "Unconditional love" at Venice Biennial, 2009
- Rapture, White Square Gallery, Berlin, Germany/Museum for Russian Art, Kyiv

In 2009, Artists Anonymous ended their working relationship with Haunch of Venison to work with Riflemaker Gallery, London.

Their work is included in various private and public Collections: Manchester City Art Gallery, UK, Deutsche Bank Collection, Saatchi Collection, UK; Advaney Collection, NL, UK; Walsall Art Museum, UK; Rubell Collection, Miami, USA, Zabludowicz Collection, UK.

In September 2012, they held their first show with Banksy at Lazarides Gallery.
