= Ceiling Painting/Yes Painting =

1966 conceptual artwork by Yoko Ono

Ceiling Painting/Yes Painting is a 1966 conceptual artwork by the Japanese artist Yoko Ono.

== Work ==
The work is made from paper, glass, a metal frame, a metal chain, a magnifying glass, and a painted ladder. The work is interactive, with the viewer (or participant) expected to climb the ladder and use a magnifying glass to look at the piece of paper beneath a sheet of glass suspended from the ceiling, which reads "YES" in small letters.

== History ==
Ceiling Painting/Yes Painting was shown at Ono's autumn 1966 show, Unfinished Paintings and Objects By Yoko Ono at the Indica Gallery in London. Two different ladders were used in the New York and subsequent London showing of the piece. The piece was displayed at Ono's 2014 retrospective at the Guggenheim Museum Bilbao.

The musician John Lennon visited the piece during the preview night of Ono's Indica exhibition on 7 November 1966: He had heard that "this amazing woman was going to be putting on a show...and it was going to be a bit of a happening." Lennon was initially impressed by the humour in Ono's work Apple, and later said of his interaction with Ceiling Painting/Yes Painting: He had "climbed the ladder, looked through the spyglass, and in tiny little letters it said 'yes'...So it was positive. I felt relieved."

The positive message of the piece attracted Lennon to Ono; the pair were subsequently introduced with neither apparently knowing much about each other's creative work. Ono recalled in a 2014 interview with art critic Jonathan Jones for The Guardian that "The ladder John had to climb up was very high." Jones wrote that the "smallness of the YES and the difficulty of reaching it" reflected Ono's pain after the breakup of a recent relationship.

The relationship of the participant to the piece has changed in subsequent decades. At a retrospective in 2000, Ceiling Painting/Yes Painting was displayed on a pedestal with physical interaction no longer possible. Interaction with Ono's Painting to Hammer a Nail was equally limited, with the piece having been displayed behind plexiglass.

== Meaning and interpretation ==
Ono has described Ceiling Painting/Yes Painting as being representative of a journey towards hope and affirmation from pain. Ono likened the difficulty in attaining hope and affirmation to the intimidating stature of a cathedral.

The relationship between Ceiling Painting/Yes Painting and Ono's 1964 work Cut Piece was extensively analyzed by James M. Harding in his essay "Between Material and Matrix: Yoko Ono's Cut Piece and the Unmaking of Collage" in his 2012 book of essays, Cutting Performances: Collage Events, Feminist Artists, and the American Avant-Garde.

== In culture ==
Lennon's initial interaction with Ceiling Painting/Yes Painting was depicted in the Canadian playwright Jean Yoon's 2002 play The Yoko Ono Project.
