= The Scotch of St. James =

Nightclub in London

- The Scotch
- Interactive map of The Scotch of St. James
- Address: 13 Mason's Yard, St James's; London, SW1Y 6BU; United Kingdom
- Coordinates: 51.5078°N 0.1371°W
- Capacity: 150
- Type: Nightclub, music venue
- Public transit: Green Park; Piccadilly Circus

Construction
- Opened: 1965; 61 years ago
- Closed: 1980; Reopened: 2013

Website
- www.the-scotch.co.uk

The Scotch of St. James is a nightclub situated at Mason's Yard, London.

Tucked away at the bottom of an alley, it served as a prominent nightclub, live music venue and historically significant meeting place for London's rock elite in the 1960s. It was a venture of London nightclub impresario, Louis Brown, whose previous clubs included La Poubelle and Le Kilt, and whose subsequent clubs included La Valbonne and Samantha's. The club opened on 14 July 1965 at the height of 1960s swinging London scene and soon replaced the Ad Lib Club, which closed in January 1966, as a meeting place for the swinging London set and rock musicians. The heritage of the Scotch St. James was referenced when it was relaunched in 2012 after 25 years of closure.

== History ==
=== 1965–1980 ===
The Scotch of St. James was where a then-unknown Jimi Hendrix first performed on the night of his arrival in England on 24 September 1966, when he joined the house band for an impromptu session on stage. It was on this night that Hendrix met Kathy Etchingham who became his girlfriend. On 25 October 1966 the Jimi Hendrix Experience played their first UK gig as a private showcase at Scotch of St. James. The club was also where Paul McCartney first met Stevie Wonder, after the latter's live performance at the club on 3 February 1966.

During its heyday in the mid 1960s, bands such as The Gass were employed as the house band. Patrons at that time included the Beatles, the Rolling Stones, the Who, the Kinks, Rod Stewart, the Moody Blues, the Spencer Davis Group, Eric Burdon, the Animals, Sonny and Cher, Inez and Charlie Foxx and Goldie and the Gingerbreads. The Beatles and Rolling Stones were also regular visitors and the club management gave them their own tables.

After falling out of fashion in the 1970s, the club struggled for clientele and eventually closed down in the mid-1980s.

=== 2012–present day ===
The club was restored and reopened by a group of investors in January 2012. After a brief collaboration with Parisian nightclub brand Le Baron between April and November 2013, the club was initially renamed 'Le Baron London at The Scotch of St. James' and then later reverted to the original name of The Scotch of St. James in March 2014.

The new club has been frequented by numerous celebrities, including Kate Moss, Sofia Coppola and Benicio del Toro, Suki Waterhouse, Cara Delevingne, Georgia May Jagger, and Edie Campbell. The club has also attracted pop stars such as Harry Styles, Plastic Bertrand and Rita Ora.

Other events hosted by the club include performances by musicians such as Miles Kane and John Legend. The club has also hosted parties for fashion houses including Stella McCartney, J.W Anderson, Longchamp, Roger Vivier, Matthew Williamson, Linda Farrow, Rockins and Eyeko. Others who have held private parties at the club include Scarlett Johansson, Rihanna, Jack White, Dinos Chapman, Keira Knightley and Mark Ronson. The venue's official Instagram account has also mentioned that the rock band Metallica partied there after a visit to London.

== Bibliography ==
- Miles, Barry (1998). Many Years From Now. Vintage-Random House. ISBN 0-7493-8658-4.
- Spitz, Bob (2006). The Beatles: The Biography. Little, Brown and Company (New York City). ISBN 1-84513-160-6.
