= Jimi: All Is by My Side =

2013 biographical drama film

- Theatrical release poster
- Directed by: John Ridley
- Written by: John Ridley
- Produced by: Danny Bramson; Anthony Burns; Jeff Culotta; Brandon Freeman; Tristan Lynch; Sean McKittrick; Nigel Thomas
- Starring: André Benjamin; Hayley Atwell; Imogen Poots; Andrew Buckley; Adrian Lester; Ruth Negga
- Cinematography: Tim Fleming
- Edited by: Hank Corwin; Chris Gill
- Music by: Danny Bramson; Waddy Wachtel
- Production companies: Darko Entertainment; Freeman Film; Subotica Entertainment; Matador Pictures
- Distributed by: XLrator Media
- Release dates: 7 September 2013 (TIFF); 8 August 2014 (UK)
- Running time: 118 minutes
- Countries: United Kingdom; Ireland
- Language: English
- Budget: $5 million
- Box office: $927,074

Jimi: All Is by My Side is a 2013 internationally co-produced biographical drama film about Jimi Hendrix, written and directed by John Ridley. The film tells the story of Hendrix's career beginnings, through his arrival in London, the creation of The Jimi Hendrix Experience and the beginning of his fame prior to his performance at the Monterey Pop Festival. It was screened in the Special Presentation section at the 2013 Toronto International Film Festival and at the South by Southwest film festival and was released in the UK on 8 August 2014. The film screened at the New Zealand International Film Festival (NZIFF) on 26 July 2014.

== Cast ==
- André 3000 as Jimi Hendrix
- Hayley Atwell as Kathy Etchingham
- Burn Gorman as Michael Jeffery
- Imogen Poots as Linda Keith
- Oliver Bennett as Noel Redding
- Tom Dunlea as Mitch Mitchell
- Andrew Buckley as Chas Chandler
- Ruth Negga as Ida
- Ashley Charles as Keith Richards
- Amy De Bhrún as Phoebe
- Clare-Hope Ashitey as Lithofayne "Faye" Pridgeon
- Laurence Kinlan as John
- Jade Yourell as Roberta Goldstein
- Sam McGovern as Ted
- Robbie Jarvis as Andrew Loog Oldham
- Adrian Lester as Michael X
- Danny McColgan as Eric Clapton

== Production ==
The film does not include any songs written by Hendrix, as the filmmakers' request to use them was denied by Experience Hendrix LLC (Hendrix's estate). Instead, the film set in London in 1966 and 1967 includes the songs that Hendrix performed during those years, shortly before the release of his debut album, Are You Experienced. All musical parts were played by Waddy Wachtel (guitar), Leland Sklar (bass), and Kenny Aronoff (drums). Wachtel wrote short segments of music for the film that sound similar to the Experience's early songs.

== Reception ==
=== Box office ===
All Is by My Side has grossed $340,911 in the United States and Canada and $586,163 in other territories, for a worldwide total of $927,074, plus $67,173 with home video sales, against a production budget of $5 million.

=== Critical response ===
Jimi: All Is by My Side received a rating of 67% on review aggregator Rotten Tomatoes, with an average rating of 6/10 based on 83 reviews. The site's consensus states: "It's uneven—and it lacks the primal power of its subject's classic recordings—but Jimi: All Is By My Side offers a well-acted alternative take on the Hendrix myth." On Metacritic, the film has a rating of 66 out of 100, based on 27 critics, indicating "generally favorable reviews". On its release, Kathy Etchingham, who was not consulted during production, strongly criticised the film's dramatization of her relationship with Hendrix, describing it as "absolute nonsense".
