= John Dunbar (artist) =

British artist (born 1943)

John Dunbar self-portrait, 1967

John Dunbar (born 1943) is a British artist, collector, and former gallerist, best known for his connections to the art and music scenes of the 1960s counterculture.

== Personal life and career ==
Dunbar was born in Mexico City in 1943, the son of the British filmmaker, Robert Dunbar. He has three sisters, Marina Adams, an architect, and twins Margaret and Jennifer Dunbar. He spent his first four years in Moscow, where his father was a cultural attache, before the family returned to England.

Dunbar attended the University of Cambridge, where he met the singer Marianne Faithfull. They were married on 6 May 1965, with Peter Asher as the best man, and spent their honeymoon in Paris, with the Beat poets Allen Ginsberg and Gregory Corso. The couple lived in a flat at 29 Lennox Gardens, Knightsbridge, London. On 10 November 1965, she gave birth to their son, Nicholas. Dunbar and Faithfull divorced in 1970, with John winning full custody of his son.

In 1965, Dunbar co-founded the Indica Gallery with Barry Miles. The gallery became known for staging exhibitions by cutting-edge artists, including Boyle Family and Yoko Ono from the Fluxus movement. It was at Indica where he introduced Ono to John Lennon. Indica folded in just two years, after which Dunbar became an artist and exhibited work alongside Peter Blake and Colin Self. From 1969 to 1971 Dunbar was exhibitions officer for the British Council, revitalizing their programme by promoting a new generation of artists such as Barry Flanagan, Colin Self, Bruce McLean and Clive Barker. With Jill Matthews, Dunbar later fathered William Dunbar, now a journalist based in Tbilisi, Georgia.

In January 2006, Dunbar participated in the International Symposium on LSD in Basel honouring LSD inventor Albert Hofmann on his 100th birthday. With John Hopkins and Barry Miles, Dunbar gave the seminar "LSD and its visual impact".. That same year, Dunbar took part in the re-staging of Indica by Riflemaker Gallery in Soho, London, hosting an in conversation with Yoko Ono and as guest speaker with a talk entitled INDICATIONS....

Since the 1960s, Dunbar has consistently maintained an eclectic practice encompassing drawing and collage, particularly in notebook context, sculpture and assemblage, photography and film. As a visual artist, John's work has been featured in a 2008 solo exhibition and 2014 retrospective in London. More recently his film work has been included in group exhibitions at Nottingham Contemporary and The Museum of Modern and Contemporary Art in Nice, France.
