= Jack Baer (art dealer) =

British art dealer

Sir Jack Baer
- Born: Jack Mervyn Frank Baer; 29 August 1924
- Died: 4 May 2016 (aged 91)
- Education: Bryanston School
- Alma mater: Slade School of Fine Art
- Occupation: Art dealer
- Known for: Chairman, Hazlitt, Gooden & Fox
- Spouses: Jean St. Clair (1952–1969); Diana Downes Baillieu (m. 1970)

Sir Jack Mervyn Frank Baer (29 August 1924 – 4 May 2016) was a British art dealer, specialising in Old Masters, and the chairman of the London art dealers Hazlitt, Gooden & Fox.

== Biography ==
=== Early life ===
Jack Mervyn Frank Baer was born on 29 August 1924. His father Frank Baer was a business executive for the British Metal Corporation; he was a German Jew who had immigrated to England as a young adult.

Baer was educated at Bryanston School, as was the slightly older artist Lucian Freud, and they would meet again in later life. He then attended the Slade School of Fine Art.

During the Second World War, he served in the Royal Air Force, in Normandy (including D-Day) and the South Pacific.

=== Career ===
After the War, his father arranged an apprenticeship, in return for an investment, with the art dealer Max de Beer. This ended when de Beer was jailed for fraud, and his father's money was lost. However, he did establish friendships with the lawyer Arnold Goodman, Delves Molesworth, who worked at the Victoria & Albert Museum, and the Hungarian art dealer, Max Hevesi.

=== Hazlitt ===
Hevesi unexpectedly died in 1947, and his son sought the assistance of Baer in winding down the Hazlitt Gallery, which Hevesi had recently started. Instead, it was agreed that Baer should take control of the business.

Baer chose to be in New York City on 1 January 1955, the very day that foreign exchange controls were removed, and quickly acquired 35 works by out-of-favour 19th-century French artists including Corot, Millet and Rousseau, for a mere £10,000. By including these works in shows at Hazlitt, he was able to judiciously influence their popularity.

Baer built Hazlitt into "a world-class concern". In 1973, a merger created Hazlitt, Gooden & Fox, followed by the opening of a New York affiliate gallery.

Baer was managing director of Hazlitt, Gooden & Fox from 1973, until 1992, when he took on the role of chairman. Baer left Hazlitt in 2001 to start a consulting business.

=== Other roles ===
From 1977 to 1980, Baer was chairman of the Society of London Art Dealers. Baer was a member of the Museums and Galleries Commission, where he worked as chairman of the acceptance in lieu panel; during his tenure, Baer is estimated to have saved £150 million of art for the nation. In 1992, he joined the Reviewing Committee on Export of Works of Art. In 2003, Baer was part of an advisory committee overseeing the updating of information on 1933–45 collections in UK museums.

Baer was knighted in 1997.

== Personal life ==
From 1952 to 1969, Baer was married to the English actress Jean St. Clair, and they had one daughter together. In 1970, he married Diana Downes Baillieu. He died on 4 May 2016, and she survived him, as did his daughter, and two stepdaughters.
