= Jean St Clair =

English actress (1920–1973)

- Born: Jean Margaret Alice St Clair; 23 September 1920; Dublin, Ireland
- Died: 29 June 1973 (aged 52); Kensington, London, England
- Occupation: Actress
- Spouse: Jack Baer (m. 1952; div. 1969)
- Children: 1

Jean Margaret Alice St Clair (23 September 1920 – 29 June 1973) was an English actress.

== Biography ==
She was born in Dublin, Ireland. Her father Lockhart Frederick Charles St. Clair was a Lieutenant in the 21st Lancers, stationed in Kildare.

She made several film appearances, including The Great St Trinian's Train Robbery in 1966.

She married, firstly, Cecil Geoffrey Monson, son of Frederick John Monson, on 5 June 1941.1 She and Cecil Geoffrey Monson were divorced in 1950.

From 1952 to 1969 she was married to the art dealer Jack Baer. They had one daughter. She was imprisoned in HMP Holloway in the early 1970s for arson, after she set fire to Baer's art gallery.

She died in Kensington, London in 1973 aged 52.

== Selected filmography ==
- The Gentle Gunman (1952) - Rosie O'Flaherty (uncredited)
- The Oracle (1953) - Young Girl
- Meet Mr. Malcolm (1954) - Mrs O’Connor
- Impulse (1954)
- Eight O'Clock Walk (1954) - Mrs. Gurney
- Aunt Clara (1954) - Alice Cole (uncredited)
- John and Julie (1955) - Miss Forbes
- Doctor at Large (1957) - O'Malley's Char (uncredited)
- Hell Drivers (1957) - Spinster
- The Young and the Guilty (1958) - Mrs. Humbolt, Marshall's Neighbor
- Dentist in the Chair (1960) - Lucy
- The Great St Trinian's Train Robbery (1966) - Drunken Dolly
- Les Grandes vacances (1967) - Mrs Mac Farrell
- Carry On Doctor (1967) - Mrs. Smith
- Fumo di Londra (1971) - The Gentleman (final film role)

=== Television ===
- The Saint (TV series) series 4 episode 7 (12/08/1965) - Madame Calliope
- Dad's Army series 3 episode 1 (11/09/1969) - Miss Meadows
