= Batman: Dark Tomorrow =

2003 video game

- North American GameCube box art
- Developer: Kemco (Note: Ported to Xbox by HotGen.)
- Publisher: Kemco
- Director: Takafumi Yuki
- Producer: Takafumi Yuki
- Designers: Tomoharu Aihara; David Vout; Takeo Mogi; Takafumi Yuki
- Programmer: Tomoharu Aihara
- Artist: Takeshi Okamoto
- Writers: Scott Peterson; Kenji Terada
- Composers: Tony Corizia; Tot Taylor
- Series: Batman
- Platforms: GameCube; Xbox
- Release: NA: 18 March 2003; JP: 21 March 2003; EU: 11 April 2003
- Genre: Action-adventure
- Mode: Single-player

Batman: Dark Tomorrow (Note: Japanese: バットマン：ダークトゥモロー, Hepburn: Battoman: Dākutoumorō) is an action-adventure game developed and published by Kemco for the GameCube and Xbox in 2003. It is based on the DC Comics character Batman. The game involves linear, stealth-based action and combat; players control Batman and navigate multiple levels while having access to a variety of weapons and gadgets to complete objectives. Many precedents of the comics are cited in the plot, such as the use of supervillain Ra's al Ghul, and Batman's relationship with al Ghul's daughter, Talia.

Initially announced in 2001 as a GameCube exclusive, Batman: Dark Tomorrow was envisioned as an open-world action-adventure game, taking a realistic approach to the Batman franchise. However, as development progressed, the game was scaled back and slated for release on multiple consoles. A PlayStation 2 version of the game was planned but ultimately scrapped.

The game was released in North America on March 18, 2003. It received negative reviews from critics, who criticized its controls, gameplay, and camera system, though the faithfulness to the comics received minor praise. In retrospect, the game is viewed as one of the worst video games ever made.

== Gameplay ==
Batman: Dark Tomorrow is a linear, stealth-based action game in which players control Batman as he fights crime and villainy. Batman is equipped with several of his tools, such as batarangs, smoke bombs, and a grappling hook. Levels each have certain objectives that players must achieve to proceed, while criminals and enemies will attempt to stop the player's progress. While enemies can be knocked unconscious, they cannot be killed (due to Batman's "no killing" code); this requires the player to handcuff enemies to keep them from attacking. The game uses a checkpoint system, with each level featuring several checkpoints that automatically save the player's progress; if Batman is killed, the game reloads to the latest checkpoint. Members of Batman's supporting cast of allies appear in the cinematics of the game, including Oracle, Robin, and Batgirl. Nightwing does not appear but is mentioned in dialogue as possible backup leading into the game's climax.

The game features various endings depending on how the last few sections are played. To get the "good" ending, Batman must disarm a signal device before facing Ra's al Ghul. This is never made clear to the player beforehand, however, and as such, players unfamiliar with the game are likely to get one of the three "bad" endings, in which Ra's sets off bombs he has planted around the globe, killing a third of the world's population. This initially caused much confusion among gamers and critics, who questioned why beating the game essentially had Batman failing to save the world.

== Plot ==
Ra's al Ghul, his daughter Talia, and his League of Assassins take control of a weaponized satellite that is targeting Gotham City. While trying to end a gang war between the Ventriloquist and Black Mask, Batman discovers that Commissioner Gordon has been kidnapped and is being held hostage at an overrun Arkham Asylum. Racing through the sewers to enter the asylum undetected, Batman has to fight through several foes, including Victor Zsasz, the Ratcatcher, Mr. Freeze, Poison Ivy, and Killer Croc, before finally encountering the Joker, the mastermind behind Gordon's kidnapping. After defeating the Joker and saving Gordon, Batman deduces that the Joker was actually working for Ra's al Ghul and that the kidnapping scheme was a distraction to allow Ra's to commence his newest plan to take over the world.

Traveling to the Himalayas, Batman makes his way to the League of Assassins' stronghold to foil Ra's al Ghul's scheme. Talia helps him by turning off the cameras around Ra's lair. Batman finds a terminal and overrides the homing signal before defeating Ubu, Ra's most trusted servant, who is guarding the entrance to the throne room. There, Batman confronts Ra's, who reveals his master plan: 24 bombs have been planted throughout the world, which, once activated, will cause the ice caps to enter the oceans, forming tsunamis and hurricanes throughout the coastlines; every coastal city on the globe will be destroyed and one third of the planet's population with it, allowing Ra's to rebuild the world in his image. Ra's then asks Batman to marry Talia and become his heir, but the Dark Knight declines, much to Talia's disappointment.

Ra's and Batman engage in a final sword fight, with Batman emerging victorious. A defeated Ra's attempts to activate the bombs, but to no avail, as they have been disabled by Batman. Ubu, having recovered, then tries to kill Batman, but Talia warns him and Batman dodges the attack, causing Ubu to unintentionally kill Ra's instead. Talia and Ubu take Ra's to the Lazarus Pit to revive him as the temple begins to self-destruct, while Batman escapes and returns to Gotham. As he looks out over the city, the Bat-Signal ignites the sky once more, calling him back into action.

Several alternate endings are possible, depending on whether or not the player found and deactivated Ra's weapon before the final battle with him, or lost the fight. If Batman did not disable the signal and loses the sword fight, he is mortally wounded by Ra's, who puts his plan into action and floods the world. If Batman loses the fight but disabled the signal, Ra's reveals to the dying Batman that the override is only temporary and that his victory is inevitable. If Batman wins the fight but did not disable the signal, a defeated Ra's still manages to commence his plan and flood the world, as Batman falls to his knees and screams "No!" in horror. If Batman wins the fight and disables the signal, Ra's still attempts to detonate the bombs but nothing happens. Ubu then throws a sword at Batman, only for Batman to dodge and the sword to strike and finish off Ra's. Batman returns to Gotham victorious, while Ra's is taken away and revived by Talia and Ubu.

== Development ==
Batman: Dark Tomorrow was presented at E3 2001 as an exclusive to the GameCube console. It was originally conceived as an open world-oriented adaptation of the comic book iteration of Batman. Similar to Activision's Spider-Man 2, players would control Batman as he traveled around Gotham City, with the ability to patrol Gotham in the Batmobile, Batplane, and Batboat. Character A.I. and combat was ambitious to allow an in-depth open world Batman experience. However, the game was later revealed to be in the works for both the Xbox and PlayStation 2 consoles, and was reworked into a more linear and stealth-based game.

Veteran DC Comics and former Batman: Gotham Adventures writer Scott Peterson (who also wrote the previous year's Superman: The Man of Steel video game) and Final Fantasy's Kenji Terada created the story for Dark Tomorrow, while the Royal Philharmonic Orchestra performed the game's orchestrated score. Peterson was not aware of Terada's involvement at the time he worked on the game's story, relating years later that he wrote the script alone while working as DC Comics' Batman office liaison and that Terada was likely brought on after he completed the script. The game had a total development time of four years and several release date delays before ultimately being released on the GameCube and Xbox in early 2003. The PlayStation 2 version was eventually cancelled.

== Reception ==
Reception

Aggregate score
Aggregator	Score	
Aggregator	GameCube	Xbox
Metacritic	29/100	25/100

Review scores
Publication	Score	
Publication	GameCube	Xbox
AllGame	1.5/5	N/A
Electronic Gaming Monthly	1.5/10	N/A
Game Informer	0.75/10	N/A
GamePro	N/A	1.5/5
GameRevolution	F	N/A
GameSpot	2.8/10	2.8/10
GameSpy	N/A	1/5
IGN	3.5/10	2.2/10
Nintendo Power	1.9/5	N/A
Official Xbox Magazine (US)	N/A	3.5/10

Batman: Dark Tomorrow gained infamy for receiving negative reviews on both platforms according to video game review aggregator Metacritic. Primary criticism of the game was directed at its control scheme, repetitive missions, and its camera, which was described as frustrating. Game Informer gave the GameCube version 0.75 out of 10 for gameplay that is "incomprehensible and littered with bugs". IGN was severely disappointed with the same console version, saying that "The Dark Knight gets his wings clipped in his latest adventure". GamePro author Andre said "It has about as much dynamism as I do when I get up in the morning."

Although the gameplay was widely criticized, Peterson and Terada's story, as well as the in-game cinematics, were praised. IGN noted that the game's DC-based Batman license faithfully brought it to life and commended the game's cutscenes. The ending, however, was met with criticism as there is no in-game direction to the "good ending".

== See also ==
- List of video games notable for negative reception
