= Cinga Samson =

South African painter

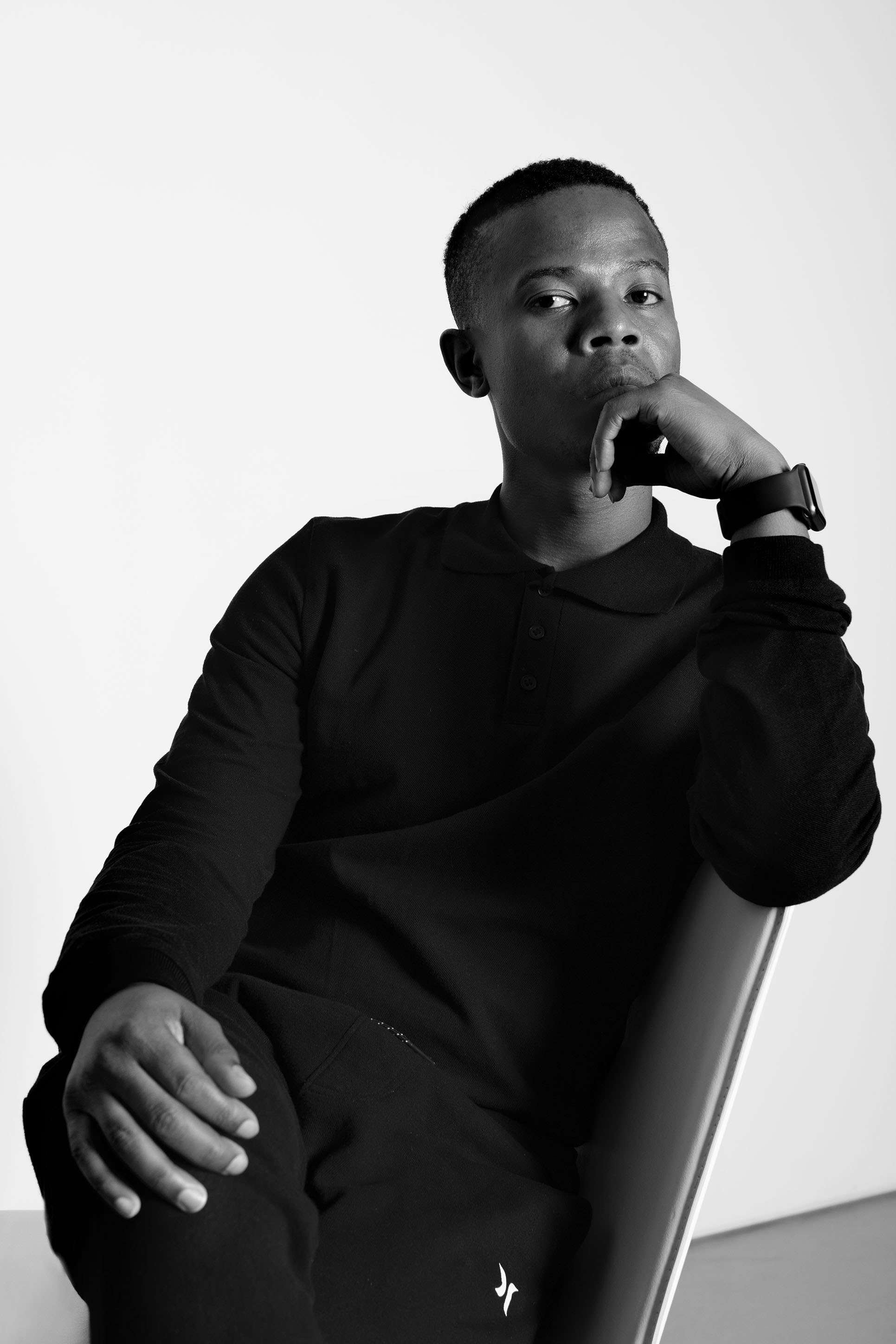
- Samson in 2020
- Born: 28 August 1986 (age 39); Cape Town, South Africa
- Known for: Painting
- Movement: Figurative art, African Art

Cinga Samson (born 1986) is a South African artist known for his figurative oil paintings of large-scale group scenes and self-portraits. Samson's work is most recognizable for his use of a dark palette, depictions of figures with pupil-less eyes, and formal, ceremonious poses.

Samson has had solo exhibitions in London, New York City and Cape Town, and his work has been included in group shows in Amsterdam, Berlin, Minneapolis, Norway, Vermont, Paris and Mexico.

He currently resides in Cape Town. Samson is represented by White Cube.

== Biography ==
Samson was born in Khayelitsha, Cape Town in 1986 and grew up between eThembeni in the rural Eastern Cape and Cape Town in the Western Cape. Shortly after finishing high school in eThembeni, Samson moved to Khayelitsha, a township outside of Cape Town.

== Start in Art ==
He first joined the art studio Isibane Creative Arts, a shared artist space in Khayelitsha where he worked alongside three older artists: Gerald Tabata, Xolile Mtakatya and Luthando Laphuwano. Samson could not always afford canvases, so he would resort to using scavenged materials. His first sale was a result of this practice. Samson created a 2 x 1.5-meter frame for a piece of Masonite board. He then painted the large canvas. The piece was noticed and purchased by art consultant Jeanetta Blignaut.

== Education ==
Samson attended the Stellenbosch Academy of Design and Photography, in Stellenbosch, Western Cape where he studied a one-year course in commercial photography.

== White Cube ==
Samson signed with a British art dealership named White Cube in 2021. White Cube is headquartered in London. The gallery has aided in selling his pieces since the signing. He is still signed and associated with White Cube today.

== Solo exhibitions ==
EXHIBITION TITLE	YEAR	VENUE	LOCATION
Ukuphuthelwa	2026	White Cube	New York, USA
Ukhe Nje Wasondela, Ndakuphosa Kulo Mlambo	2023-24	Norval Foundation	Cape Town, South Africa
Nzulu Yemfihlakalo	2023	White Cube	London, UK
Iyabanda Intsimbi	2021	FLAG Art Foundation	New York, USA
Amanda Akafani, Afana Ngeentshebe Zodwa	2020	Perrotin Gallery	New York, USA
NaluLwandle, NaliKhaya	2019	blank projects	Cape Town, South Africa
Umthamo (with Nicholas Hlobo)	2018	Maitland Institute	Cape Town, South Africa
Safari Fantasy	2017	blank projects	Cape Town, South Africa
Ubugqoboka Magqoboka	2016	blank projects	Cape Town, South Africa
Thirty Pieces of Silver	2015	blank projects	Cape Town, South Africa
Rusting Iron	2011	AVA Gallery	Cape Town, South Africa

== Current Studio ==
Samson currently works in his own art studio. The studio was converted from an industrial building in Cape Town, South Africa.
