= Wen Wu (artist) =

Portrait painter

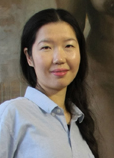
Wen Wu in 2010

Wen Wu (born 23 May 1978) is a portrait painter from Qingdao, China, residing in London.

Wu studied art at Tsinghua University. She moved to London in 2004 to complete an MA at Guildhall School of Fine Art (now part of London Metropolitan University).

Her painting Venus as a Boy was exhibited at the National Portrait Gallery in 2011 and received the BP Portrait Award for 2011. She had a solo exhibition with Riflemaker Gallery in 2017.
