= Virna Lindt =

Swedish singer and record producer

- Origin: Stockholm, Sweden
- Genres: Synth-pop; pop
- Occupations: Singer; record producer
- Instrument: Vocals
- Labels: Compact Org; LTM

Virna Lindt is a Swedish singer and record producer. Her debut single "Attention Stockholm" became an indie-chart hit in 1982. She released two studio albums, Shiver in 1983 and Play/Record in 1985, both on the Compact Organization label. Both collaborations with writer/producer/arranger Tot Taylor. Combining pop, soundtrack and experimental influences, they have since been reissued on CD by LTM. Her style has been described as "John Barry-meets-new wave" and, in another review, a diseuse.

After a long hiatus, Lindt returned to music in 2019 with the release "Avant-garde Pts 1 & 2," and in 2021 with the single "Once."

== Discography ==
- Shiver (1983)
- Play/Record (1985)
- Danube (2025)
