= Duke Street, St James's =

Street in London, England

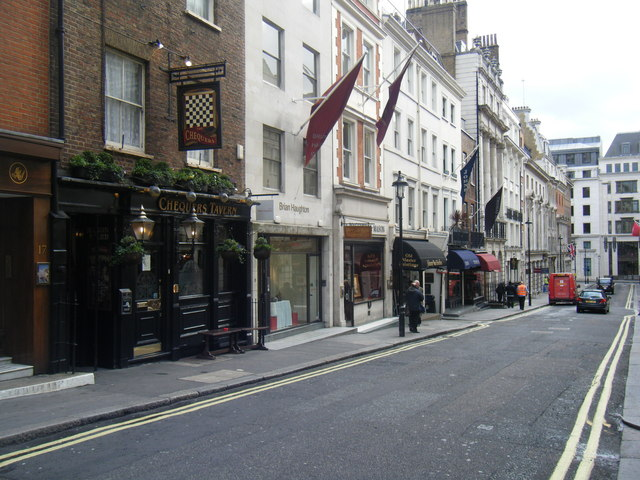
- South-west side of Duke Street, St James's
- Interactive map of Duke Street, St James's
- Length: 0.22 km (0.14 mi)
- Location: St James's, London, United Kingdom
- Postal code: SW1
- Nearest Tube station: Green Park
- Coordinates: 51.507589°N 0.137983°W
- North: Piccadilly
- South: King Street

Other
- Known for: Art galleries

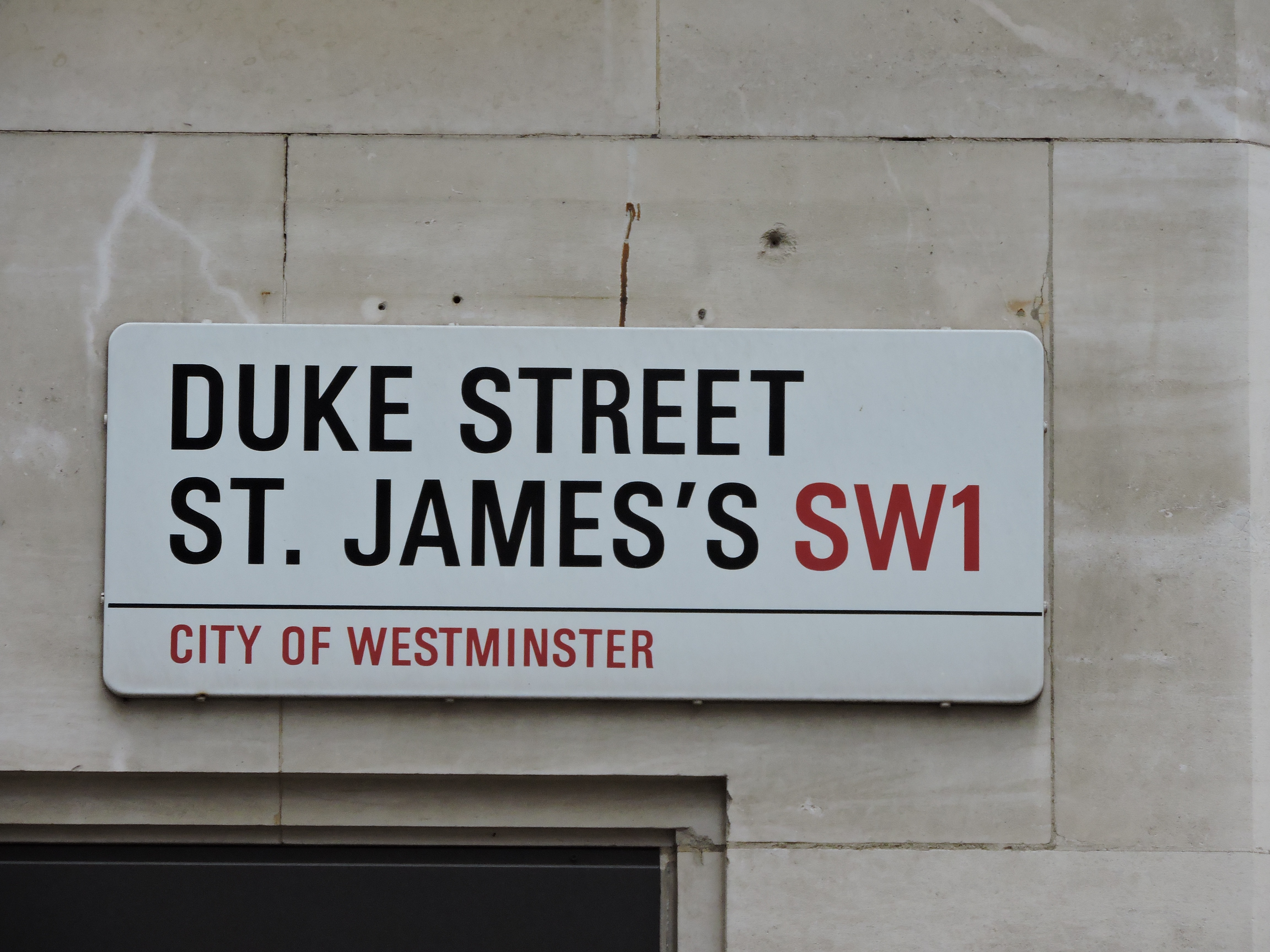
Street sign for Duke Street, St James's, SW1

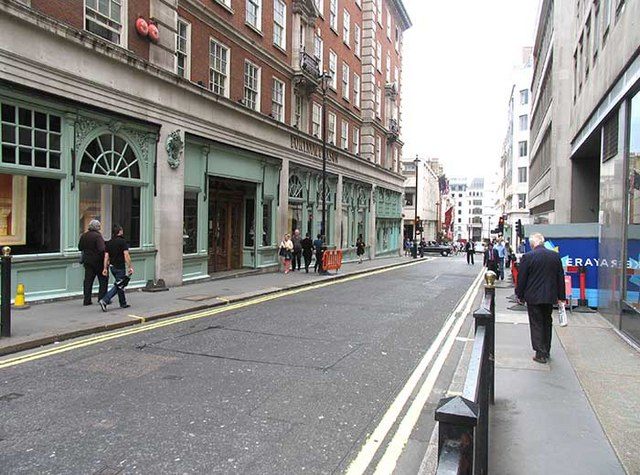
Duke Street, St James's viewed from Piccadilly

Duke Street, St James's is a street in the St James's area of the City of Westminster, London. It runs from Piccadilly in the north to King Street in the south, and is crossed by Jermyn Street. Ryder Street joins it on the western side. On the eastern side it provides access to Masons Yard. The upmarket department store Fortnum & Mason occupies the north-west corner.

== History ==
Duke Street first appeared in the rate books of the parish of St. Martin in the Fields in 1673. It is likely that it was named in honour of James, Duke of York, later James II. Building of the street was completed in the 1680s, though none of the original houses remain.

The Chequers Tavern, at No. 16, occupies a site that has been a public house since 1732, when Henry Mason, the then occupant, was granted a victualler's licence for an unnamed tavern. His successor was Robert Morgoridge, and William Morgridge was granted a victualler's licence for the Mason's Arms in Duke Street in 1744. By 1751, the name of the tavern had been changed to the Chequers. Mason's Yard is now located to the east of Duke Street.

== Notable residents ==
Notable residents of Duke Street include:

- 1686 Christopher Hatton, 1st Viscount Hatton English aristocrat and diplomat.
- 1707 Edward Villiers, 1st Earl of Jersey
- 1760 Thomas Villiers, Baron Hyde, later first Earl of Clarendon
- 1815 Tom Cribb, prize-fighter.
- 1815-1830 Charles Lewis (bookbinder)
- 1941 Al Bowlly (vocalist and jazz guitarist) was killed in April 1941 by a parachute mine at his flat at 32 Duke Street

A lodger in Duke Street, St James's was Edmund Burke, who dated letters from here between December 1790 and March 1791, and in January 1794.

== Listed buildings ==
- 11 Duke Street, St James's (Grade II) Terraced house with later shop.
- 2 & 3 Duke Street, St James's (Grade II) Office and gallery building. 1910-12 by E. Vincent Harris and Thomas A. Moodie.

== Culture ==
“The street is now a centre of fine art dealers and galleries” Forming part of the St James's Art District, Duke Street is an important location for its concentration of art galleries, covering modern and contemporary art, sculpture, old masters and tapestries. It includes the premises of Bernard Jacobson Gallery, Willow Gallery, Thomas Heneage, S Franses Ltd, MacConnal-Mason Galleries, Sims Reed Rare Books and Whitford Fine Art.

== See also ==
- Duke Street, Marylebone
- The Duchess of Duke Street, a BBC TV drama.
