= St James's =

Coordinates: 51.5085°N 0.1330°W

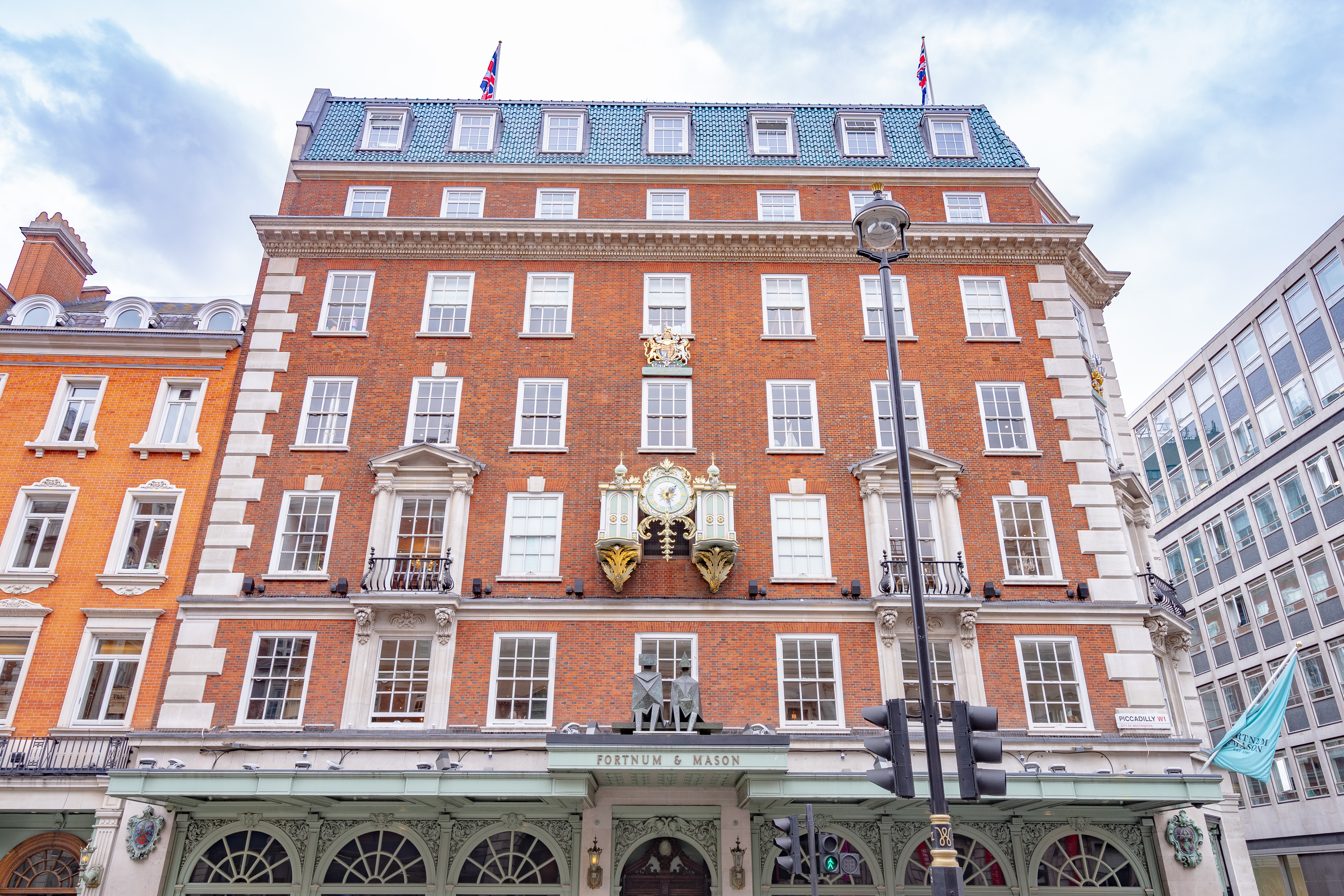
- Fortnum & Mason flagship store, Piccadilly

- Location within Greater London
- Population: 10,828 (2011 Census. Ward)
- OS grid reference: TQ295805
  - Charing Cross: 0.5 mi (0.8 km) E
- London borough: Westminster
- Ceremonial county: Greater London
- Region: London
- Country: England
- Sovereign state: United Kingdom
- Post town: LONDON
- Postcode district: SW1
- Dialling code: 020
- Police: Metropolitan
- Fire: London
- Ambulance: London
- UK Parliament: Cities of London and Westminster
- London Assembly: West Central

St James's is a district of Westminster, and a central district in the City of Westminster, London, forming part of the West End. The area was once part of the northwestern gardens and parks of St. James's Palace and much of it is still owned by the Crown Estate. During the Restoration in the 17th century, the area was developed as a residential location for the British aristocracy, and around the 19th century was the focus of the development of their gentlemen's clubs. Once part of the parish of St Martin in the Fields, much of it formed the parish of St James from 1685 to 1922. Since the Second World War the area has transitioned from residential to commercial use.

St James's is bounded to the north by Piccadilly and Mayfair, to the west by Green Park, to the south by The Mall and St. James's Park, and to the east by Haymarket.

== Toponymy ==
The area's name is derived from the dedication of a 12th-century leper hospital to Saint James the Less. The hospital site is now occupied by St James's Palace. The area became known as "Clubland" because of the historic presence of gentlemen's clubs.

The section of Regent Street (colloquially known as 'Lower Regent Street') that runs between Waterloo Place and Piccadilly Circus has been officially renamed 'Regent Street St James's'.

== Urban development ==
St James's was once part of the same royal park as Green Park and St. James's Park. In the 1660s, Charles II gave the right to develop the area to Henry Jermyn, 1st Earl of St Albans who developed it as a predominantly aristocratic residential area around a grid of streets centred on St James's Square. Until the Second World War, St James's remained one of the most exclusive residential enclaves in London. Notable residences include St James's Palace, Clarence House, Marlborough House, Lancaster House, Spencer House, Schomberg House, Norfolk House, Bridgewater House, and the remaining townhomes of Carlton House Terrace.

== Governance ==
=== Historical ===
St James's was in the ancient parish of St Martin in the Fields in the Liberty of Westminster. Attempts made in 1664, 1668 and 1670 to separate St James's from the parish were resisted by St Martin's vestry. The building of St James's Church, Piccadilly in 1684 forced the issue, and a new parish of St James within the Liberty of Westminster was created in 1685. The parish stretched from Oxford Street in the north to Pall Mall in the south. It roughly corresponded to the contemporary St James's area, but extended into parts of Soho and Mayfair. Land south of Pall Mall remained in St Martin in the Fields' parish, and St James's Park was split between the parishes of St Martin and St Margaret. St James's Palace was an extra-parochial area and not part of any parish. A select vestry was created for the new parish.

=== Local government ===
For elections to Westminster City Council, the area is part of the St James's ward. The ward includes Covent Garden, the Strand, Westminster and Chinatown. The ward elects three councillors.. The incumbent councillors are San Abishev, Tim Mitchell and Mark Shearer, all of the Conservative Party

== Notable streets ==
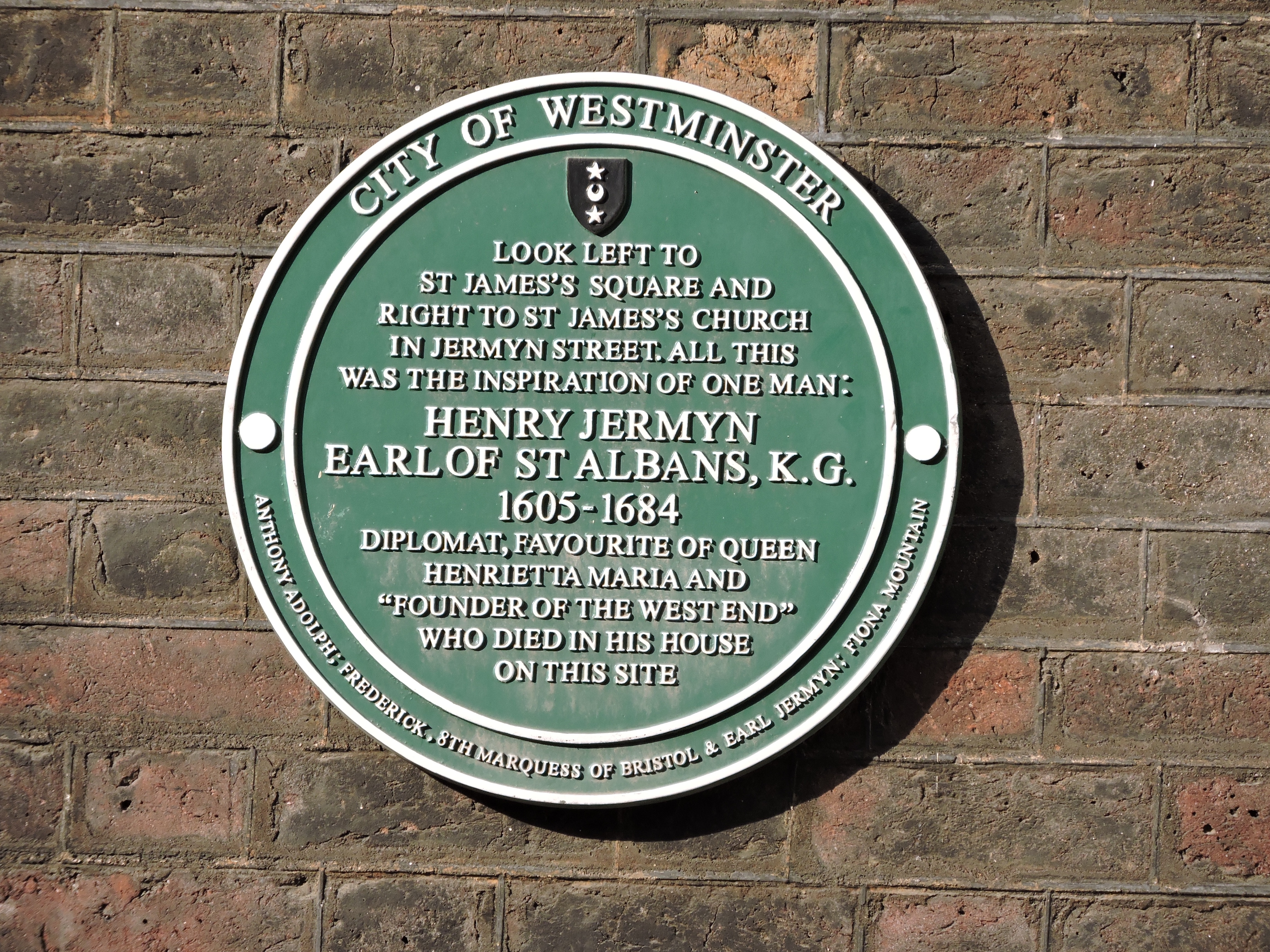
City of Westminster green plaque for Henry Jermyn, Earl of St Albans (1605–1684), located in Duke of York Street, London SW1

Notable streets include:

- St James's Square, which retains many of its original houses but is mostly in office use. The London Library is located there.
- Jermyn Street, an upmarket retail street best known for bespoke shirtmakers and shops offering the finest gentlemen's attire.
- Pall Mall, which contains many of London's gentlemen's clubs. It is also home to Marlborough House, the seat of the Commonwealth Secretariat, and the Québec Government Office in London.
- Crown Passage, a narrow street which splits off from Pall Mall opposite Marlborough House and is home to the Red Lion, one of the oldest pubs in London's West End to still be in business.
- Haymarket was once the best-known centre of prostitution in London, but no trace remains of this part of its past. It contains two historic theatres: the Theatre Royal Haymarket and His Majesty's Theatre.
- Carlton House Terrace, a pair of grand terraces of houses designed by John Nash overlooking St. James's Park.
- St James's Street, which runs down from Piccadilly to St James's Palace.

== Street name etymologies ==
The following utilises the generally accepted boundaries of St James’s, viz. Piccadilly to the north, Haymarket and Cockspur Street to the east, The Mall to the south and Queen's Walk to the west.

- St Alban's Street – after Henry Jermyn, 1st Earl of Saint Albans, 17th century politician and local landowner
- Angel Court – thought to be after a former inn of this name
- Apple Tree Yard – thought to be after the apple trees formerly to be found here; formerly Angier Street
- Arlington Street – after Henry Bennet, 1st Earl of Arlington, 17th century statesman and local landowner
- Babmaes Street – named after Baptist May (or Mays), trustee to local landowner Henry Jermyn, 1st Earl of Saint Albans; it was formerly known as Babmay's Mews
- Bennet Street – after Henry Bennet, 1st Earl of Arlington, 17th century statesman and local landowner
- Blue Ball Yard – after the former 18th century Blew Ball tavern here
- Bury Street – after Henry Jermyn, 1st Earl of Saint Albans and Baron Jermyn of St Edmundsbury (Bury St Edmunds), 17th century politician and local landowner
- Carlton Gardens, Carlton Street and Carlton House Terrace – after the former Carlton House, built here in 1709 for Henry Boyle, 1st Baron Carleton
- Catherine Wheel Yard – from the name of an inn that stood on this site until it burnt down in 1895
- Charing Cross – after the Eleanor cross at Charing, from the Old English word "cierring", referring to a bend in the River Thames
- Charles II Street – named after Charles II, king when this street was built
- Church Place – after the adjacent St James's Church, Piccadilly; formerly Church Passage
- Cleveland Place and Cleveland Row – after Cleveland House (now Bridgwater House), named for Barbara Palmer, 1st Duchess of Cleveland who lived there in the late 17th century
- Cockspur Court and Cockspur Street – unknown, though possibly after the cock fighting that formerly occurred here, cocks often having spurs attached to their feet during fights
- Crown Passage – thought to be after a former tavern of this name
- Duke Street, St James's and Duke of York Street – named after James II, Duke of York when the street was built and brother to Charles II, king at the time
- Eagle Place
- Haymarket – site of a former market selling hay until the 1830s
- St James's Market, St James's Place, St James's Square, St James's Street and Little St James's Street – all from St James's Palace, built on the site of the medieval St James's leper hospital which was dedicated to St James the Less, apostle and Bishop of Jerusalem, or, according to Sheila Fairfield, writing in The Streets of London (1983), to the other apostle James, son of Zebedee
- Jermyn Street – after Henry Jermyn, 1st Earl of Saint Albans, 17th century politician and local landowner
- King Street – named after Charles II, king when this street was built in the 1600s
- The Mall – built as a course for playing the game pall-mall, fashionable in the 17th century
- Marlborough Road – after the adjacent Marlborough House, built for Sarah Churchill, Duchess of Marlborough in 1711
- Mason's Yard – after the local 18th century victualler Henry Mason; it was formerly known as West Stable Yard
- Norris Street – after Godfrye Norris, local leaseholder in the 17th century
- Ormond Yard – after James Butler, 1st Duke of Ormonde, who owned a house next to this yard in the 17th century
- Pall Mall and Pall Mall Place – laid out as a grounds for playing the game pall-mall in the 17th century
- Park Place – after the nearby Green Park
- Piccadilly, Piccadilly Arcade and Piccadilly Circus – after Piccadilly Hall, home of local tailor Robert Baker in the 17th century, believed to be named after the piccadills –cut-work lace trimming used for hems or fashionable broad collars of the 16th and 17th century– which made his fortune. Circus is a British term for an older-style circular road junction; it was laid out by John Nash in 1819
- Pickering Place – after William Pickering, local painter, stainer and grocer, who leased property here in the 1730s
- Princes Arcade – built 1929–1933, named after the former Prince's Hotel, which stood here
- Princes Place
- Queen's Walk – after Caroline of Ansbach, wife of George II, who took a strong interest in the Royal Parks
- Regent Street – made in the 1810s by John Nash and named after the Prince Regent, later George IV
- Rose and Crown Yard – unknown, probably after a former inn of this name
- Royal Opera Arcade – originally part of an opera house theatre, built by John Nash
- Russell Court – after the Russell family, who lived here in the 1600s
- Ryder Court, Ryder Street and Ryder Yard – after Richard Rider, Master Carpenter to Charles II
- Spring Gardens – after the 17th century pleasure grounds of this name which formerly lay on this site; they were closed in 1660
- Stable Yard and Stable Yard Road – as they leads to the stables of St James's Palace
- Warwick House Street – formerly approached Warwick House, built in the 17th century for Sir Philip Warwick
- Waterloo Place – after the Battle of Waterloo which ended the Napoleonic Wars

== Economy ==
St James's is a predominantly commercial area with some of the highest rents in London and, consequently, the world. The auction house Christie's is based in King Street, and the surrounding streets contain many upmarket art and antique dealers including Colnaghi, Agnew's Gallery, Moretti Fine Art, Hazlitt, Gooden & Fox, Stoppenbach & Delestre Ltd, The Sladmore Gallery and S Franses Ltd.

BP is headquartered in St James's. The area is home to fine wine merchants including Berry Brothers and Rudd, at number 3 St James's Street. Adjoining St James's Street is Jermyn Street, famous for tailoring. Some famous cigar retailers are at 35 St James's Street, occupied by Davidoff of London; J.J. Fox at 19 St James's Street and Dunhill at 50 Jermyn St.

Shoemaker, Wildsmith, designers of the first loafer, was located at 41 Duke Street but is now at 13 Savile Row.

== Culture ==
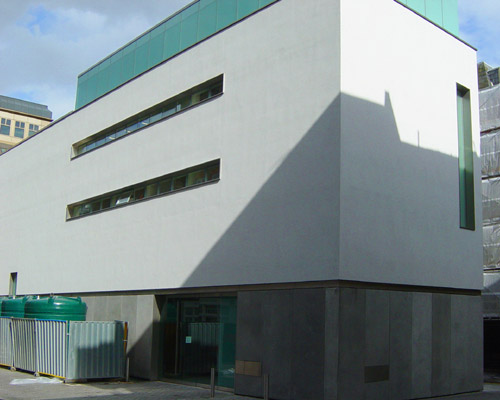
White Cube gallery in Mason's Yard, St James's

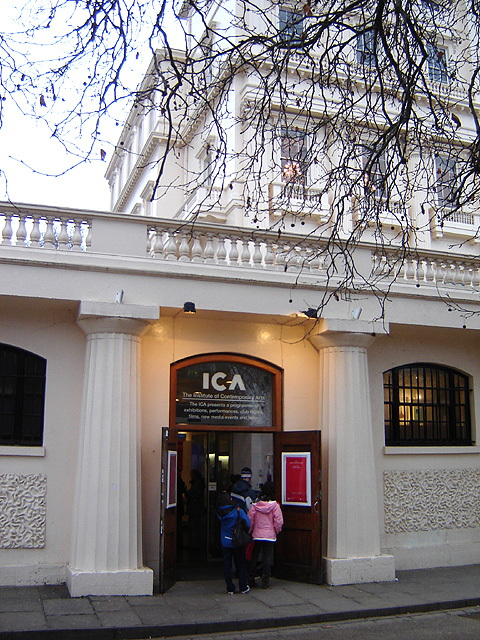
Institute of Contemporary Arts

Art galleries catering for a spectrum of tastes occupy premises in the area. The White Cube gallery, which represents Damien Hirst and Tracey Emin, opened in Duke Street before moving to Hoxton Square. In September 2006, it opened a second gallery at 25–26 Mason's Yard, off Duke Street, on a plot previously occupied by an electricity substation. The gallery is the first free-standing building to be built in the area for more than 30 years.

Other notable modern and contemporary art dealers in the St James's area include Helly Nahmad Gallery, Paisnel Gallery, Bernard Jacobson Gallery, Thomas Dane, Whitford Fine Art and Panter & Hall.

On the southernmost border of St James's is The Mall where The Institute of Contemporary Arts and the Mall Galleries are located.

Located on 3 Bennet Street in St James's, central London, on the corner with St James's Street, Portland Gallery is one of London's commercial art galleries dealing in modern British and contemporary paintings.

=== Clubland ===
St James's is home to many of the best known gentlemen's clubs in London, and sometimes, though not as often as formerly, referred to as "Clubland". The clubs are organisations of English high society. A variety of groups come together here, such as military officers, politicians, motoring enthusiasts, yachtsmen, and other groups. In 1990, the Carlton Club, traditional meeting place for members of the Conservative Party, was struck by an IRA bomb.

== See also ==
- List of schools in the City of Westminster
- Townhouse (Great Britain), for the aristocratic nature of speculative building in the development of St James's
