= Riflemaker =

English art business and exhibition space

Coordinates: 51.5129°N 0.1364°W

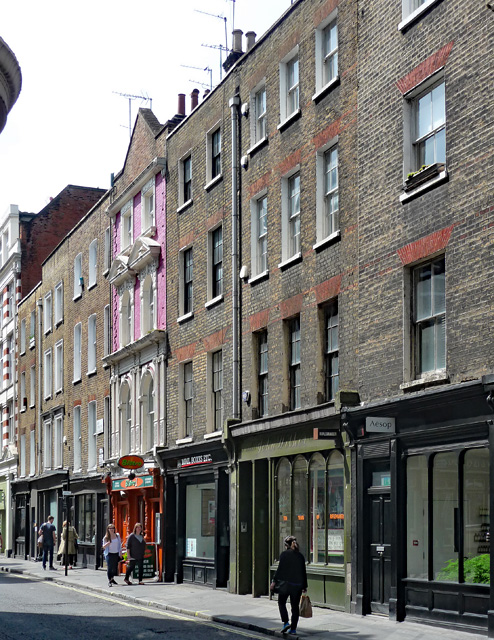
Beak Street, Riflemaker's building at number 79 being the second from the right

Riflemaker is a contemporary art business and exhibition space in London specialising in exhibiting and representing emerging artists. The building is a historic gunmaker's workshop off Regent Street. Built in 1712, it is one of the oldest public buildings in the West End of London. Riflemaker is also a publisher of artists books and host of a variety of events including poetry, music, film events, talks, discussions and performances in the space.

== Exhibitions and events ==
The gallery business was opened in 2003 by Virginia Damtsa and Tot Taylor to explore areas of feminist, performance and sound art, with live performances and discussions taking place every Monday night. The gallery's artists have exhibited at Tate, V&A, ICA, MoMA, Lacma, Frieze Masters and numerous art fairs and public museums around the world. Exhibitions have included portraitist Stuart Pearson Wright in a dual painting/film exhibition featuring the actress Keira Knightley in her debut art-film performance and photographs of voodoo ritual in Haiti by Leah Gordon (co-curator Venice Biennale Haitian Pavilion 2011) as well as a themed exhibition on the disappearance of the ANALOG world - particularly with regard to print photography and recorded music. In 2006, the gallery stopped being Riflemaker for four months and transformed itself into the seminal London art space Indica Gallery (active from November 65 - November 66), with a changing exhibition of work actually shown at Indica and a series of performances including Peter Whitehead (film) and Yoko Ono (Bagism). Ono's artwork Apple was recreated for the exhibition.

Widely reviewed were a floor-to-ceiling installation of paintings by Francesca Lowe with accompanying text by the novelist Alasdair Gray, and Pt 2 of the ANALOG three-instalment exhibition 2010–2015. There were also 'live' exhibitions by Christopher Bucklow (2004) and (2009) and Graham Fink (2014) and (2017).

The 2012 programme included Berlin collective Artists Anonymous and poem machines by the American kinetic pioneer Liliane Lijn in conjunction with Sir John Soane's Museum (Lijn is currently featured in the exhibition Ecstatic Alphabets at MoMA New York); Belfast sculptor Tim Shaw's figurative installation Soul Snatcher Possession, 1970s photo-collages by Penelope Slinger and flipbook films by Juan Fontanive. 2012 exhibitions included Leah Gordon's Caste Portraits (June–July) and a performative exhibition by Alice Anderson in October that year. The feminist artist Judy Chicago displayed test-plates from The Dinner Party and also early drawings and paintings in 2016. The Chinese artist Wen Wu's 2018 exhibition of small 'text' paintings in Beijing and at Riflemaker London was the final exhibition at the Beak St premises.
