= King Street, St James's =

Street in St James's, London

Coordinates: 51°30′22.61″N 0°8′16.42″W

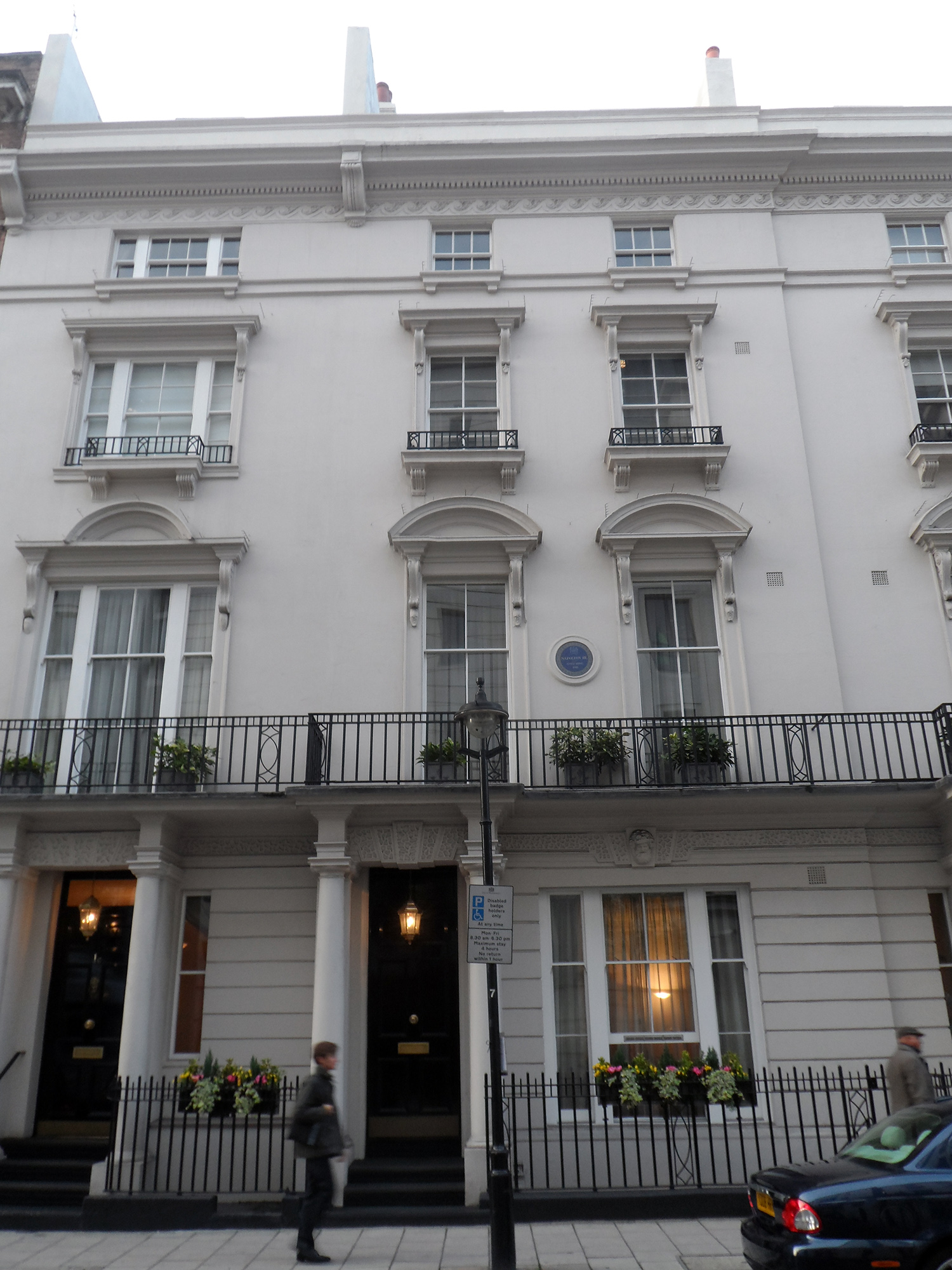
1c King Street, St James's. Formerly home to Napoleon III.

King Street is a street in the St James's district of the City of Westminster. It runs south-west to north-east from St James's Street to St James's Square.

== History ==
King Street was probably named after Charles II, and is first mentioned in ratebooks in 1673, having been known before as Charles Street.

The 1200-seat St James's Theatre on the corner with Duke Street opened in 1835, but was demolished in 1957, despite widespread protests.

Notable occupiers include the principal London premises of the auctioneers Christie's, and Palamon Capital Partners.
