= Tim Woolcock =

British painter

- Born: 2 May 1952 (age 74); Blackpool, Lancashire, England
- Education: London University; Roehampton Institute
- Occupation: Painter

Tim Woolcock (born 1952 in Lancashire, England) is a Modern British painter painting in the tradition of the 1950s. His works have been exhibited nationally and internationally and are in private and public collections worldwide. In 2009 the Office of Public Works in Dublin, Ireland acquired one of his artworks for the Department of Arts, Heritage and the Gaeltacht.

== Life and career ==
Between 1963 and 1970, he attended Arnold School in Blackpool, northern England. In 1971, he attended Roehampton Institute to study Philosophy and Art. From 1974–1986, he taught in London schools. Currently he lives part of the year on a farm in County Carlow, Ireland where his studio is located. In 2019 Woolcock created and donated the painting "Blue and Turquoise Amalgam" for the Chelsea and Westminster Hospital second floor atrium as he and members of his family have been patients in the hospital, and he wanted to return something in gratitude.

== Style and influences ==
As a modern British painter Woolcock's landscapes have often been described as mystical in their composition. He has always shown an affinity with Zen and this is reflected in most of his work. The strong pigments used in his oil colour have also made his work distinctive.

The London Times art critic Joanna Pitman wrote this about Woolcock's style and influences: "The scale and proportions of his work present an internal harmony, and this mood is completed in the delicate balance between form and the exquisite colours he uses. We see lyrical lines and geometric fragmented shapes...Woolcock has seemed to show an interest in Cubism and a wonderful sense of contour and drama. There is a meditative serenity in his colour variations which perhaps reflects the contemplative personality of Woolcock himself...his landscapes evoke the beauty and grandeur of the Irish Countryside"

At the Paisnel Gallery Exhibition "Nine by Three" in 2016 Tim Woolcock stated "The execution of a painting can be startling spontaneous once I've comprehended the essence of a subject. Some of my paintings may instill different feelings in two separate viewers. Over the years I have asked collectors what motivated them to purchase my paintings and the majority replied 'the primary visual impact was the deciding factor'. I have never really attempted to manipulate my material to communicate something to an audience. I would always hope that paintings produced would evoke a spirit. If the 'self' can be forgotten in front of an easel who knows what may manifest?"

The Sladmore Gallery published a video on Vimeo titled: 'Tim Woolcock, Recent Landscape Paintings' in which the artist details his inspiration and style.

== Exhibitions ==
- 2002 St Gilles Gallery, Norwich;
- 2003 Bloxham Gallery, London;
- 2004 Russell Gallery, London; Art London; Art Chicago;
- 2005 Royal Society of British Artists; Russell Gallery, London; Art London; Langham Gallery, Suffolk;
- 2006 Lemon Street Gallery, Cornwall;
- 2009 13th Boston Fine Art Show;
- 2012 Jorgensen Gallery Dublin;
- 2016 Paisnel Gallery, London;
- 2017 Paisnel Gallery, London;
- 2016 London Art Fair, Paisnel Gallery, London;
- 2018 London Art Fair, Paisnel Gallery, London;
- 2018 St Ives & Post War, The Nine British Art, London;
- 2018 British Art Fair, London;
- 2018 20/21 British Art Fair, The Nine British Art, London;
- 2019 London Art Fair, The Nine British Art, London;
- 2021 The Nine British Art. London Art Fair 2021;
- 2022 The Abstract Line, The Stow Art House;
- 2023 The Sladmore Gallery, Treasure House Fair London;
- 2023 The Sladmore Gallery, Recent Landscapes;
- 2024 The Sladmore Gallery, The Treasure House Fair London;
- 2026 Tanya Baxter Contemporary;
