= The Nine British Art =

Art gallery in London

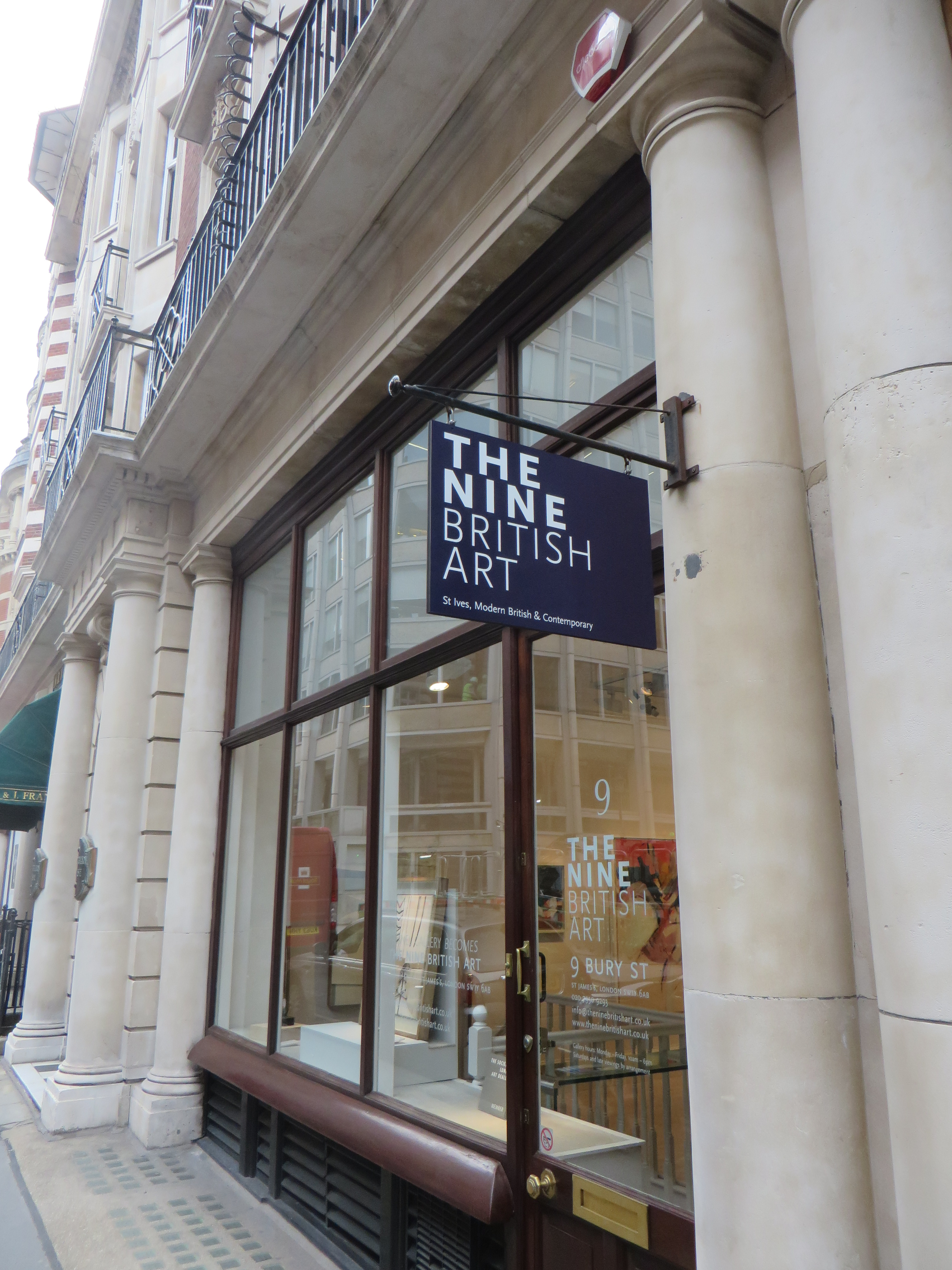
- View of The Nine British Art in Bury Street

- Location within central London
- Established: 1977 (as Paisnel Gallery); 2018 (as The Nine British Art)
- Location: 40/41 Pall Mall, St James's, London SW1Y 5JG, UK
- Coordinates: 51.50611°N 0.13597°W
- Type: Art gallery
- Collections: 20th and 21st century British art, especially the St Ives School
- Website: theninebritishart.co.uk

The Nine British Art is a private art gallery in St James's, central London, England. The gallery specializes in British art, with a focus on works from the St Ives group and the post-war period.

== Overview ==
The gallery covers 20th and 21st century British art, mainly art since World War II, particularly paintings and sculptures by St Ives School artists. It also represents contemporary artists, holding regular group and solo exhibitions of artists including Robert Fogell, Richard Fox, Jeremy Gardiner, Jonathan S. Hooper, Keith Milow, Tim Woolcock, and Gary Wragg. The gallery has exhibited at the London Art Fair and the British Art Fair.

The gallery is a private limited company. It is owned and run by Stephen and Sylvia Paisnel.

== History ==
The gallery was originally founded in 1977 as the Paisnel Gallery. It was first on Fulham Road, London SW6, before moving to 22 Mason's Yard, London SW1, in the early 1990s. The gallery was established at 9 Bury Street, London SW1, in 2006, hence its name.

The gallery changed its name to "The Nine British Art" in 2018. Since 2024, the gallery has been located in Pall Mall, London SW1.

== Exhibited artists ==
The following selected artists have been exhibited at and had artworks handled by the gallery:

- Trevor Bell
- Sandra Blow
- Frank Bowling
- Martin Bradley
- John Bratby
- Max Chapman
- Robert Clatworthy
- Prunella Clough
- Maurice Cockrill
- John Copnall
- Alan Davie
- Robyn Denny
- Paul Feiler
- Robert Fogell
- Richard Fox
- Terry Frost
- Jeremy Gardiner
- William Gear
- Frederick Gore
- Adrian Heath
- Barbara Hepworth
- Patrick Heron
- Ivon Hitchens
- Jonathan S. Hooper
- Peter Lanyon
- Keith Milow
- Denis Mitchell
- Henry Moore
- John Plumb
- Graham Sutherland
- Julian Trevelyan
- John Tunnard
- William Turnbull
- Keith Vaughan
- Brian Wall
- Billie Waters
- Frank Avray Wilson
- Tim Woolcock
- Gary Wragg
- Bryan Wynter

== Selected exhibition publications ==
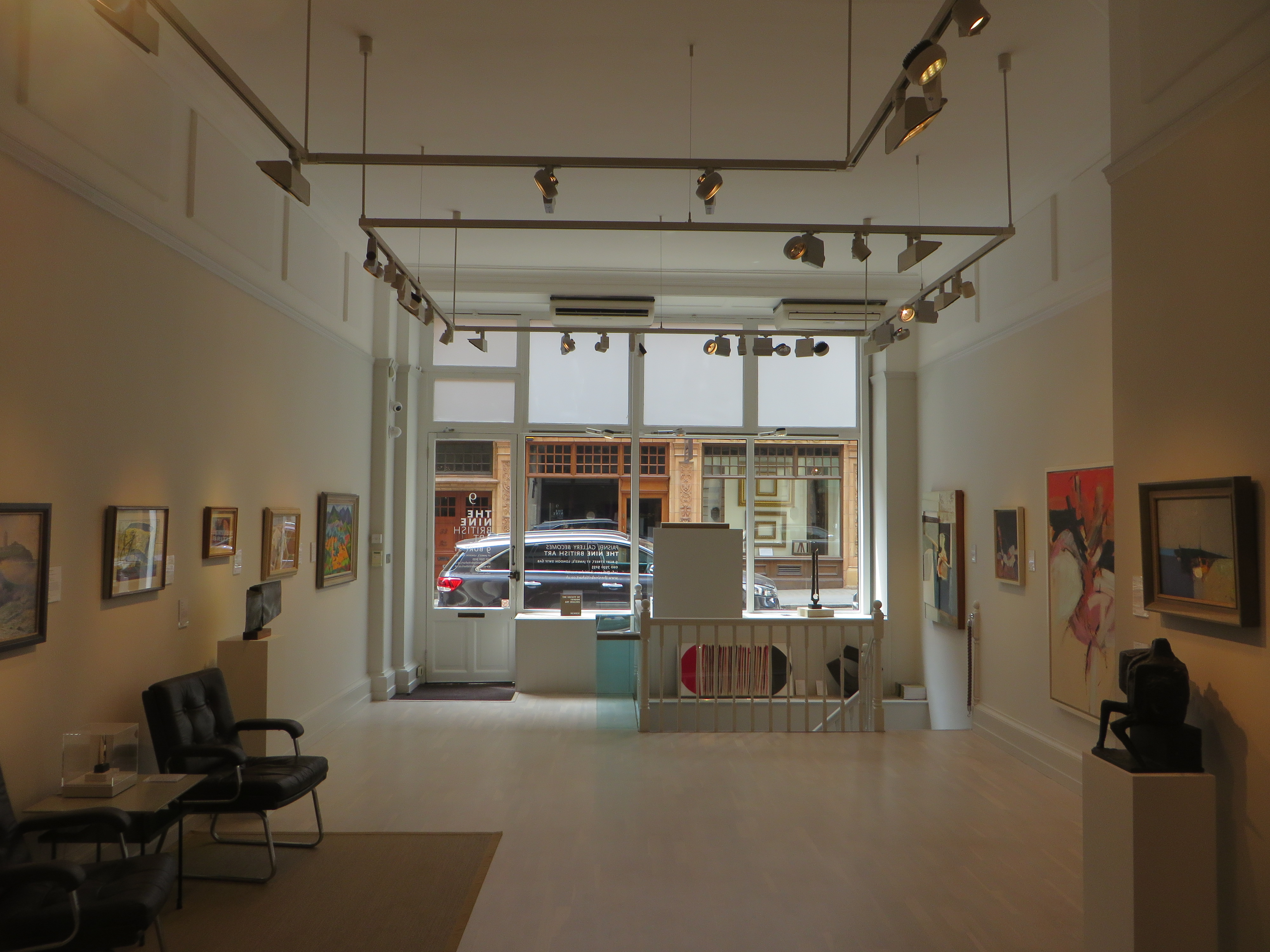
Internal view of the gallery in Bury Street

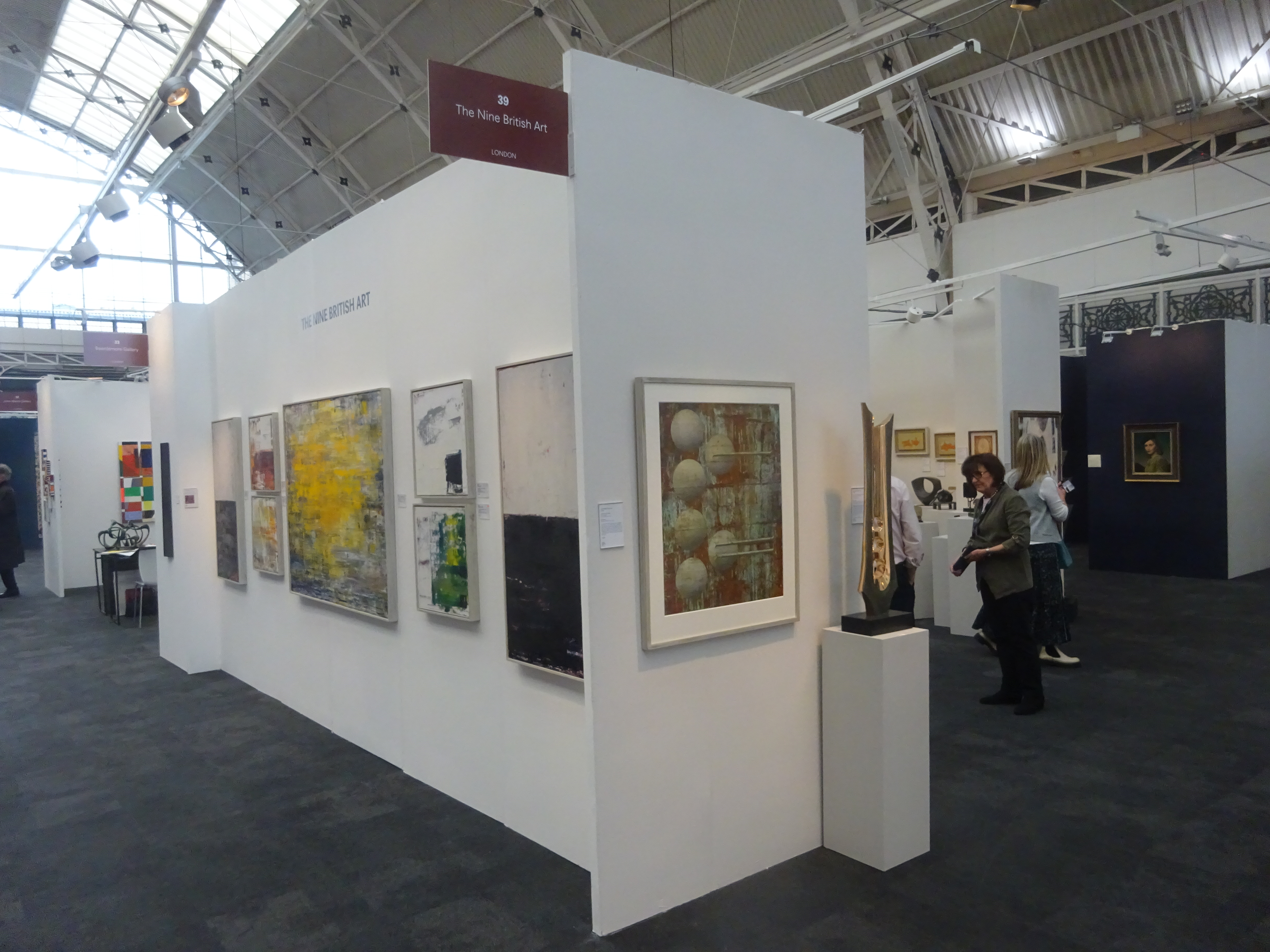
The Nine British Art exhibition stand at the London Art Fair in 2022

The gallery produces print and digital publications to accompany its exhibitions, with its online catalogues freely available via the Issuu electronic publishing platform. Examples of exhibition publications include:

- On View at Pall Mall (2024)
- Modern British & Contemporary (2023)
- Leigh Davis – Pushing Boundaries (2022)
- St Ives Modern British Contemporary (2021)
- Leigh Davis – Further into Abstraction (2021)
- Jeremy Gardiner – South by Southwest (2020)
- St Ives, Modern British, Contemporary (2019)
- Jeremy Gardiner – Tintagel to Lulworth Cove (2019)
- Leigh Davis – A New Perspective (2018)
- St Ives & Post-War (2017)
- Gary Wragg – Still Soaring at 70 (2017)
- Jeremy Gardiner – Drawn to the Coast (2017)
- 40 Years On (2017)
- Jeremy Gardiner – Pillars of Light (2016)
- St Ives and Post-War (2016)
- 20th Century British Art (2015)
- John Plumb – A Retrospective (2015)
- Peter Haigh – Paintings '84–'94 (2015)
- 20th Century British Art (2014)
- Jeremy Gardiner – Exploring the Elemental (2013)
- Sculptures of Note and Prospect (2013)
- 20th Century British Art (2013)
- 20th Century British Art (2012)
- Frank Avray Wilson – The Vital Years (2011)
- 20th Century British Art (2010)
