= Jonathan Hooper =

Jonathan Hooper may refer to:

- JJ Hooper, English footballer
- Jonathan S Hooper, British painter and sculptor
