= Corneille de Lyon =

16th-century Dutch painter

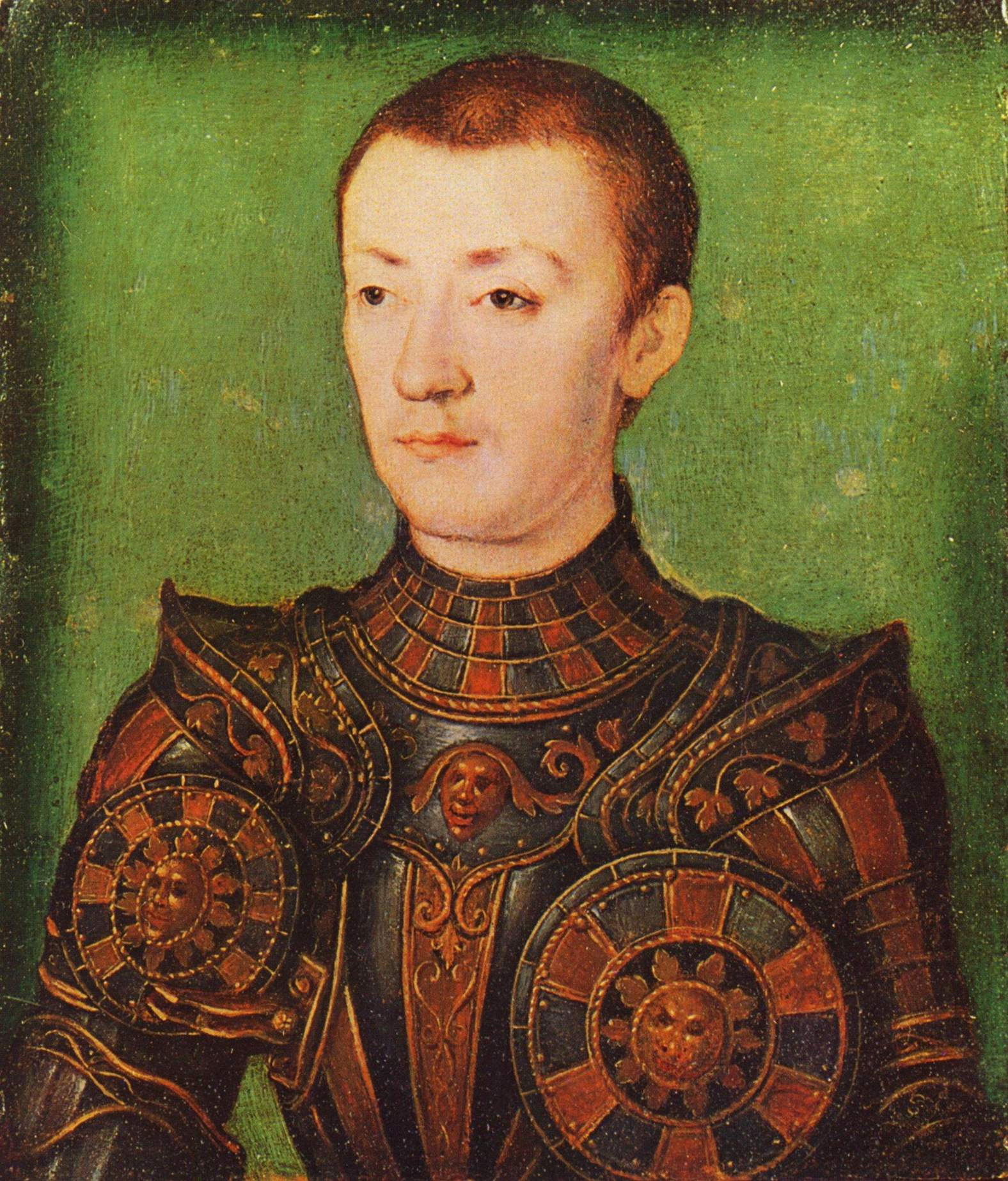
Henri, Dauphin of France, c. 1536, Galleria Estense, Modena

Corneille de Lyon (early 16th century – 8 November 1575 (buried)) was a Dutch painter of portraits who was active in Lyon, France, from 1533 until his death. In France and the Netherlands he is also still known as Corneille de La Haye (Dutch: Cornelis van Den Haag) after his birthplace, The Hague.

Although he is well documented as the leading painter in this distinctively French style, because he never signed or dated his paintings very few identifiable works can be firmly traced as his, with the first one identified in 1962. Distinguishing his hand from the many other artists working in the same style is therefore extremely difficult, if not impossible; works tend to be attributed to him on grounds of quality alone.

Corneille's portraits are nearly miniature in scale, ranging from the size of a postcard to about 8" × 10". Corneille worked in oil paint on wood panels. The flesh areas are painted very thinly, while the greenish backgrounds are painted more thickly. Similarities with the work of Hans Holbein may point to the use of tracing frames by both painters. The Louvre in Paris and New York's Metropolitan Museum of Art are both good places to study Corneille's work, whilst versions of his Portrait of a Lady (said to be Anne Stuart, Maréchale d'Aubigny) are in the Louvre, Bristol Museum & Art Gallery and Versailles. The Metropolitan Museum has a portrait in the Robert Lehman collection, and another in the Jack and Belle Linsky collection, as well as six other works, some of which are not always on view. Boston's Museum of Fine Arts has two works by Corneille and the Indianapolis Museum of Art at Newfields has three. His Portrait of an Unknown Gentleman has been in the Museum of Fine Arts of Lyon since 2014.

Corneille also painted a portrait of Madeleine of France, Queen of Scotland. London Art Week detailed the painting by noting: "It was painted when the artist was at the height of his powers at the Valois court in Lyon, and is very likely a royal commission. At the time, the sixteen-year-old princess was being courted by James V of Scotland (1512–1542), becoming engaged and subsequently married to the twenty-four-year-old in January 1537. She had been painted some fourteen years earlier as a baby, by Jean Clouet, one of the greatest of all 16th century court artists, a painting formerly with The Weiss Gallery in 2007."

This painting was displayed at the Musee de Blois, and on 19 July 1996, it was stolen. The museum director, Thierry Crépin-Leblond, told The New York Times, "With the Corneille de Lyon," he said, referring to the work stolen in 1996, "it was painted on a wooden panel. The frame was attached to the wall, but not the painting. Breitwieser was able to open a gap between the frame and the wall and slip out the panel." The painting was later determined to be one of 239 works stolen by Stéphane Breitwieser. The painting was never recovered, and is one thought to have been destroyed by his mother.

== Gallery ==
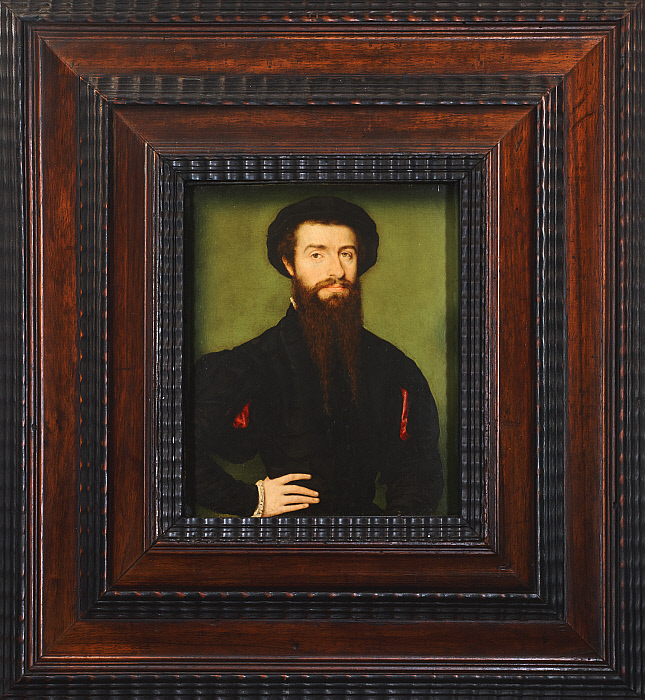
Possibly Sir John Chichester (1540–45), oil on panel, 7 9/16 × 6 5/8 in. (19.2 × 16.9 cm), Clark Art Institute

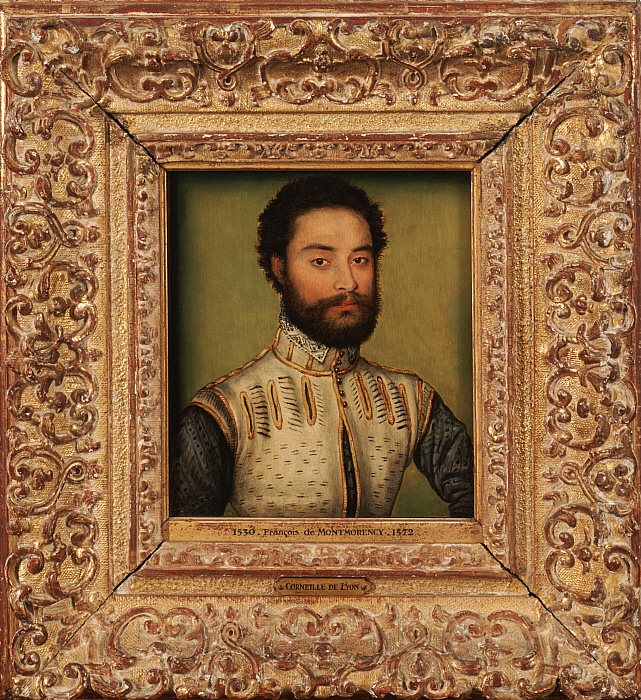
François de Montmorency (1557), oil on panel, 7 3/8 × 6 5/16 in. (18.8 × 16 cm), Clark Art Institute

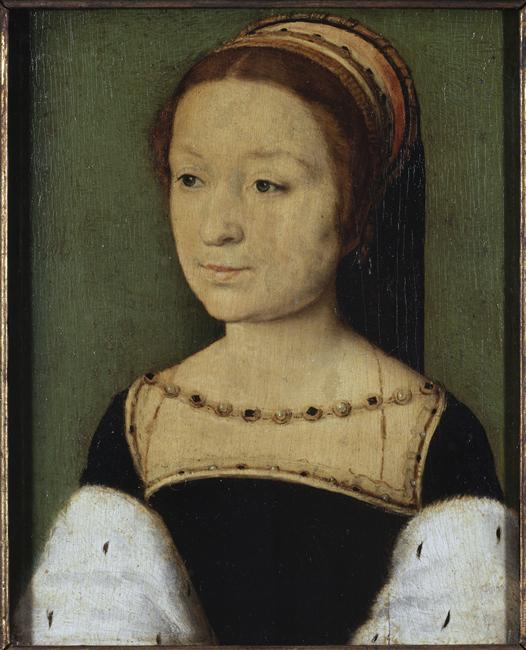
Madeleine of France, later Queen Consort of Scotland, oil on panel: 5 1/2 × 4 5/8 in. (13.8 × 11.8 cm.)
