= Alexander Klingspor =

Swedish painter and sculptor

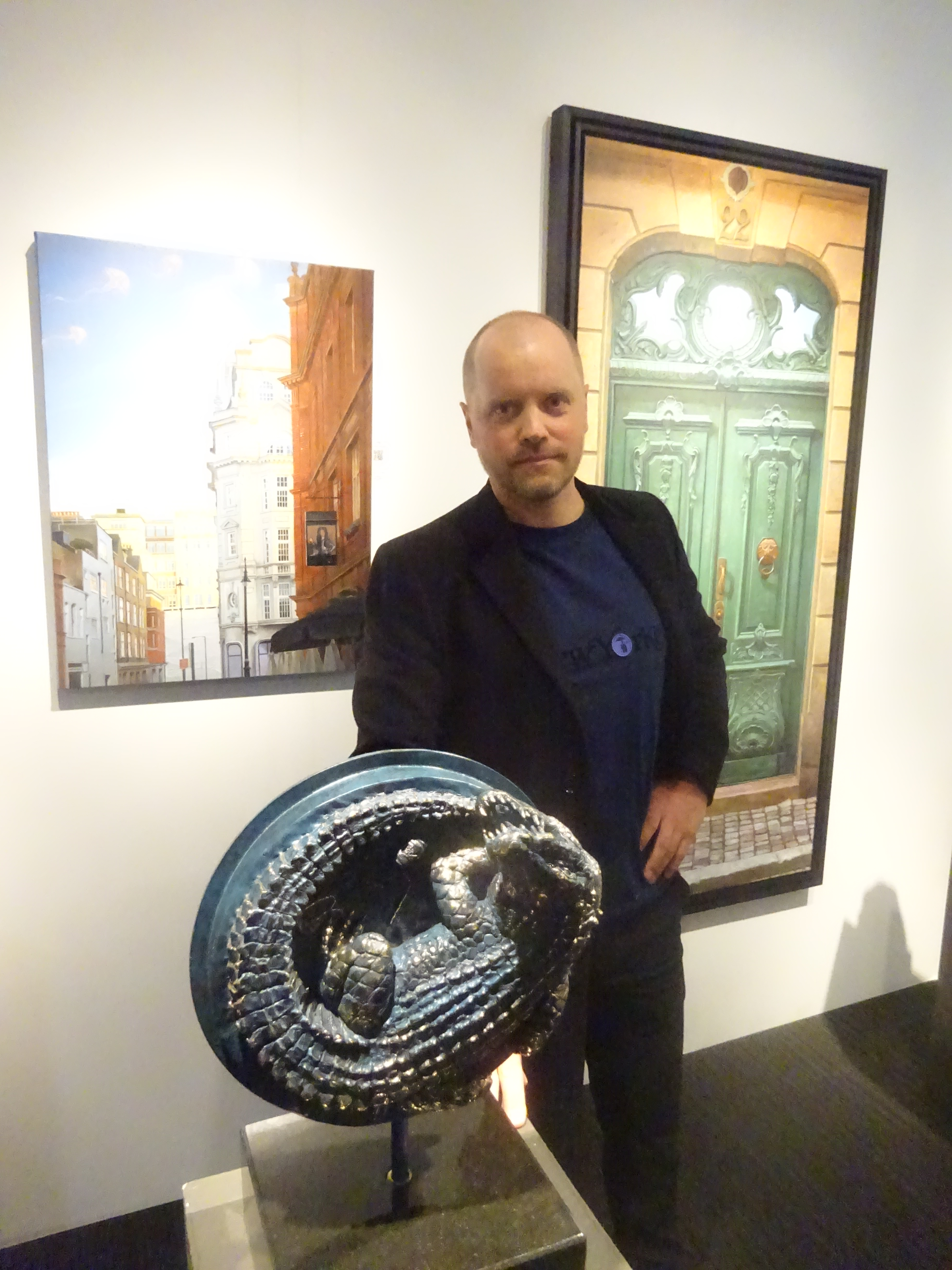
- Alexander Klingspor at the London Art Fair in 2022
- Born: 1977 (age 48–49); Stockholm, Sweden
- Education: Apprenticed to Mark English
- Known for: Painting; sculpture
- Movement: Surrealism
- Patrons: Iris Cantor, Whoopi Goldberg, Salman Rushdie, Stellan Skarsård
- Website: www.alexanderklingspor.com

Alexander Klingspor (born 1977 in Stockholm) is a contemporary Swedish painter and sculptor who has worked in Sweden, the United States, and the United Kingdom.

== Overview ==
Klingspor left Sweden for the United States and was apprenticed to the American illustrator and painter Mark English in Kansas City, Missouri. He then returned to Stockholm in Sweden and joined the workshop of Magnus Bratt, a copyist artist for the National Museum of Sweden, who specializes in 16th-century oil paintings.

Klingspor has worked in Sweden, the United States, and the United Kingdom, based in Stockholm, New York City, and London. His themes explore the unconscious mind with a surreal quality. Klingspor's exhibitions include:

- 2000 – Gallery Stenlund, Stockholm, Sweden
- 2002 – Cercle Suedois, Paris, France
- 2003, 2004, 2006, 2009 – Arcadia Gallery, New York City, United States
- 2005 – Gallery Agardh & Tornvall, Stockholm, Sweden
- 2007 – Christie's, Stockholm, Sweden
- 2008 – LA Art Fair, Los Angeles, United States
- 2008, 2013 – A Gallery, Gothenborg, Sweden
- 2010 – Hotel Diplomat Gallery, Stockholm, Sweden
- 2012 – Albemarle Gallery, London, United Kingdom
- 2018 – "Surreal Alternative", RJD Gallery, Bridgehampton, New York, United States
- 2019 – "Eat The Night", RJD Gallery, Bridgehampton, New York, United States
- 2022–26 – Mollbrinks Art Gallery, London Art Fair, Business Design Centre, London, United Kingdom
- 2023–24 – NYC Legend, Art in the Parks, New York City, United States
- 2023 – "It's all about Sculptures!", Mollbrinks Art Gallery, Kungshamn, Sweden
- 2024 – Fiumano Clase Mixed Winter Exhibition, Fiumano Clase, St James's, London, United Kingdom

Klingspor has been represented by the Albemarle Gallery in London, England, and the A Gallery in Gothenborg, Sweden. He has studios in New York City and at Stockholm's Royal Academy. Klingspor's works are held in the collections of Iris Cantor, Whoopi Goldberg, Salman Rushdie, and Stellan Skarsård. He is painted portraits of the economist Hans Tson Söderström and the CEO of Atlas Copco, Electrolux, and Ericsson, Michael Trescow.

In October 2023, a large version of the sculpture N.Y.C. Legend was installed in Union Square, Manhattan, New York City, unveiled by Queen Silvia of Sweden.

== Gallery ==
Artworks at the 2022 London Art Fair
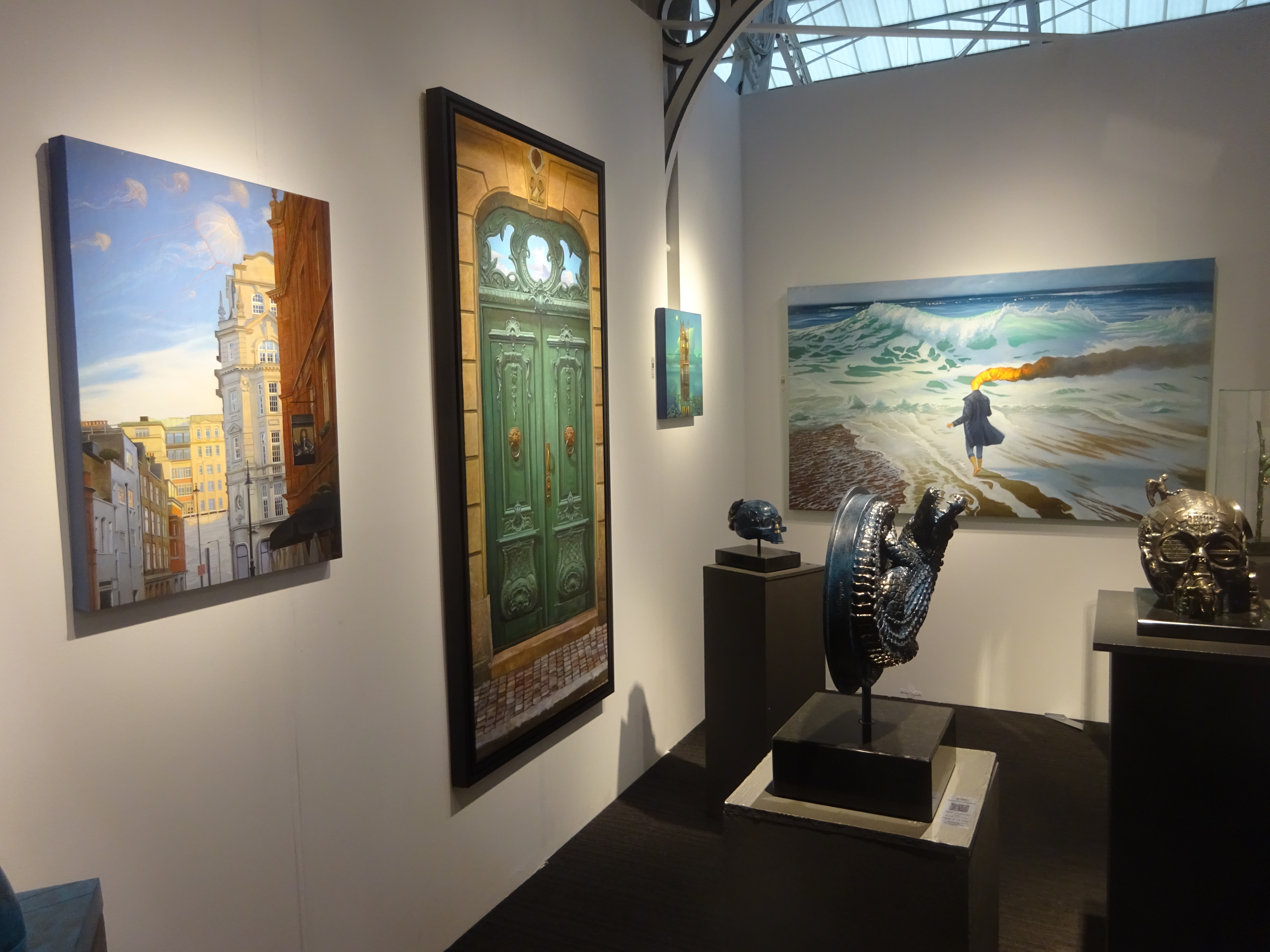
Artworks at the Mollbrinks Art Gallery stand, London Art Fair, April 2022

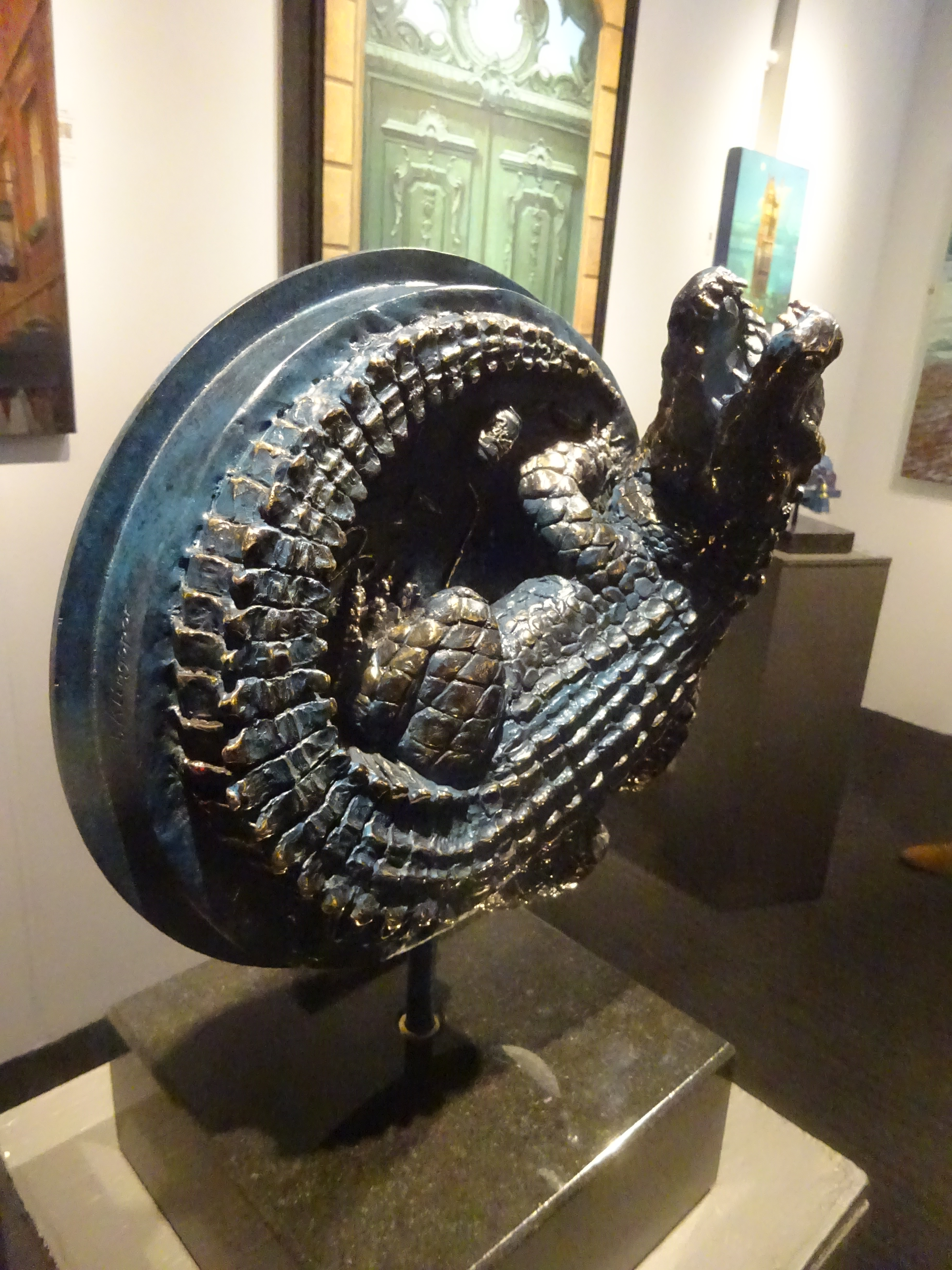
"NYC Legend" sculpture with an alligator

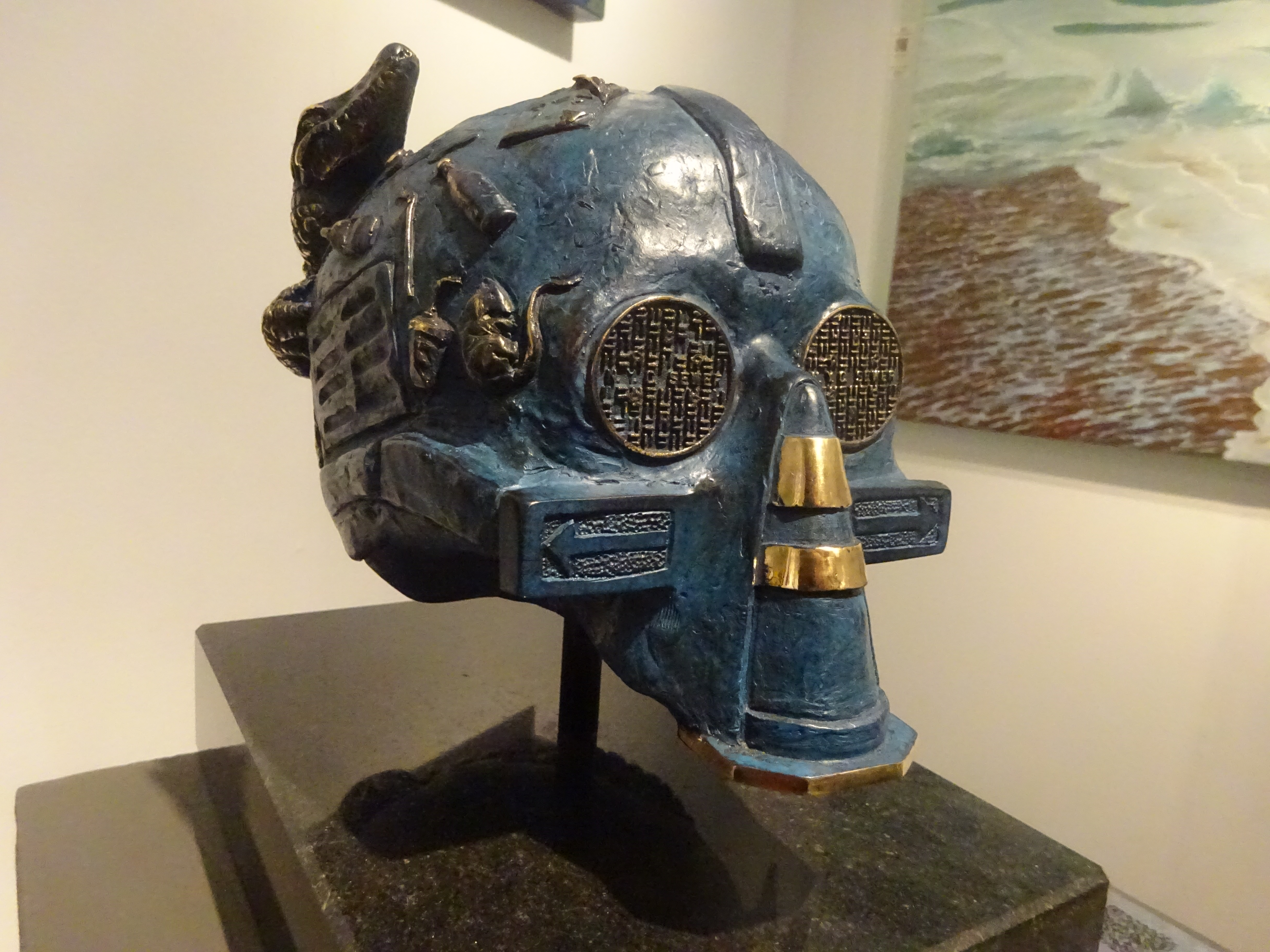
"Hybrid Speciation I: NYC", New York City-inspired steampunk sculpture

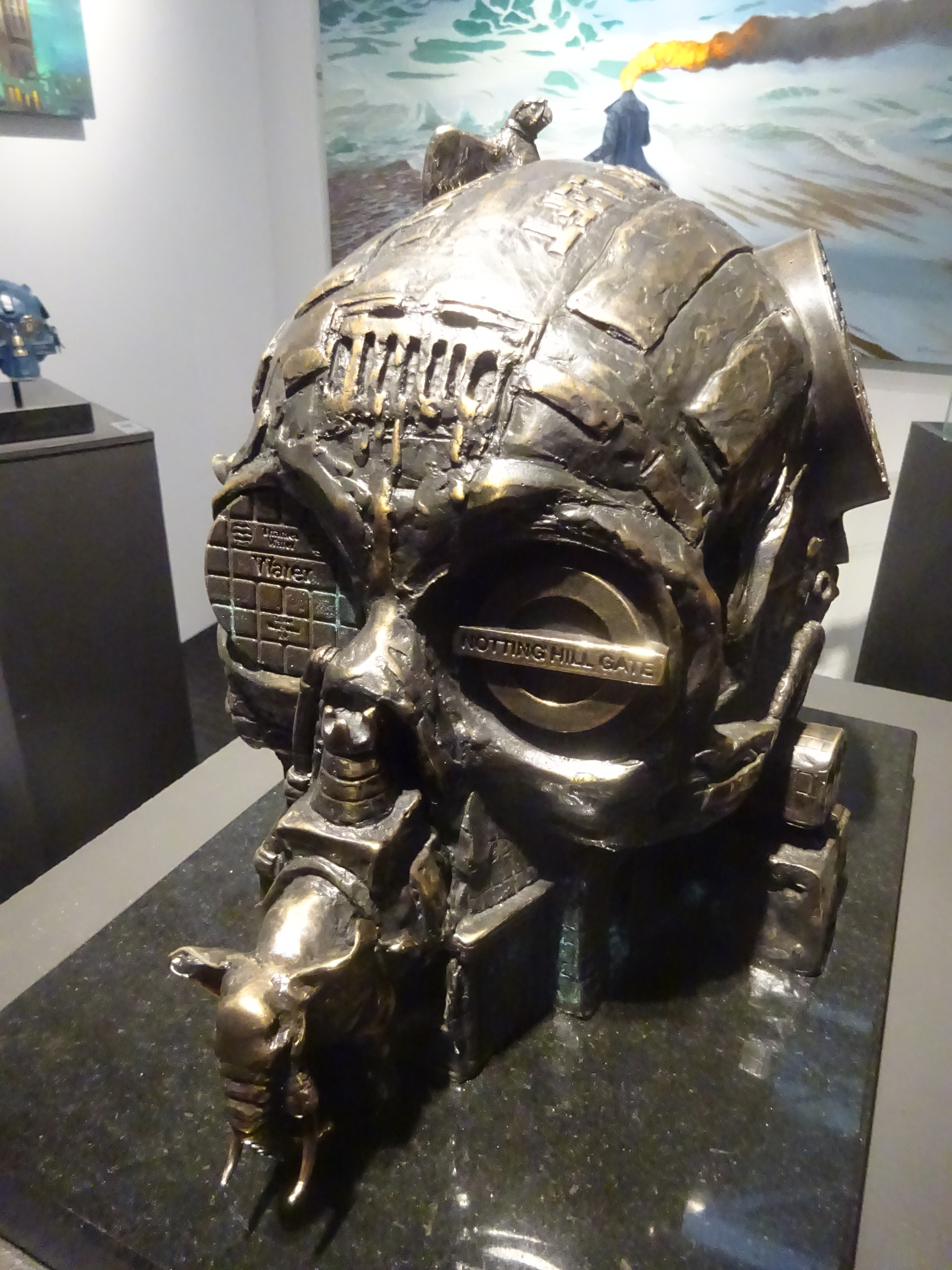
"Hybrid Speciation II: London", London-inspired steampunk sculpture

== Selected publications ==
Magazines

- "Mörkret Som Lyskraft". Bona Vita (in Swedish). May 2003.
- "Painting Noir". American Art Collector. November 2006.
- "Alexander Klingspor Söker Efter Mörkret". Fokus (in Swedish). May 2008.
- "Stor i Amerika". Clear Skies (in Swedish). October 2008.
- "Air – Alexander Klingspor". Claph. April 2012.
- "Svensk Nyromantik I New York". Residence (in Swedish). September 2012.
- "Better Thoughts". Vs. March 2014.
- "Artists Ma". Vs. March 2016.

Books

- Klingspor, Alexander; Persson, Per Åke (2005). Alexander Klingspor (in Swedish). Stockholm: Galleri Agardh & Tornvall.
- Klingspor, Alexander; Sidén, Karin Sidén; Lundeberg, Catrin; Engelhardt, Lars (2018). Alexander Klingspor: Resenär [Alexander Klingspor: Traveller] (in Swedish). Stockholm: Prins Eugens Waldemarsudde.
