= Robert Fogell =

- Born: Robert Fogell; 1963
- Education: University of Warwick
- Known for: Conservation, Sculpture, Art gallery, Contemporary art
- Spouse: Diane Fogell
- Website: www.robfogell.co.uk

Robert Fogell (born 1963) is a British sculptor, conservator-restorer, and art gallery owner.

Fogell trained in sculpture conservation under the artist Paul Giudici. His initial interest was in classical and modern stone sculpture. He has undertaken restoration work for public and private collections, including the British Museum, English Heritage, the National Trust, and the Victoria and Albert Museum.

He trained at the University of Warwick for a Cert Ed award and then taught at Northampton College, the University of Leicester, and Burghley House Education. He has combined teaching with maintaining a studio. Fogell uses small maquettes initially and his works are completed in bronze, steel, stone, and mixed media. He has been represented by The Nine British Art since 2016.

== Robert Fogell Art Gallery ==
In 2006, Fogell opened the Robert Fogell Art Gallery in Stamford, Lincolnshire, for British contemporary and modern art. The gallery participates in the Cambridge Art Fair.
