= Portrait of an Unknown Gentleman (Corneille de Lyon) =

Painting by Corneille de Lyon

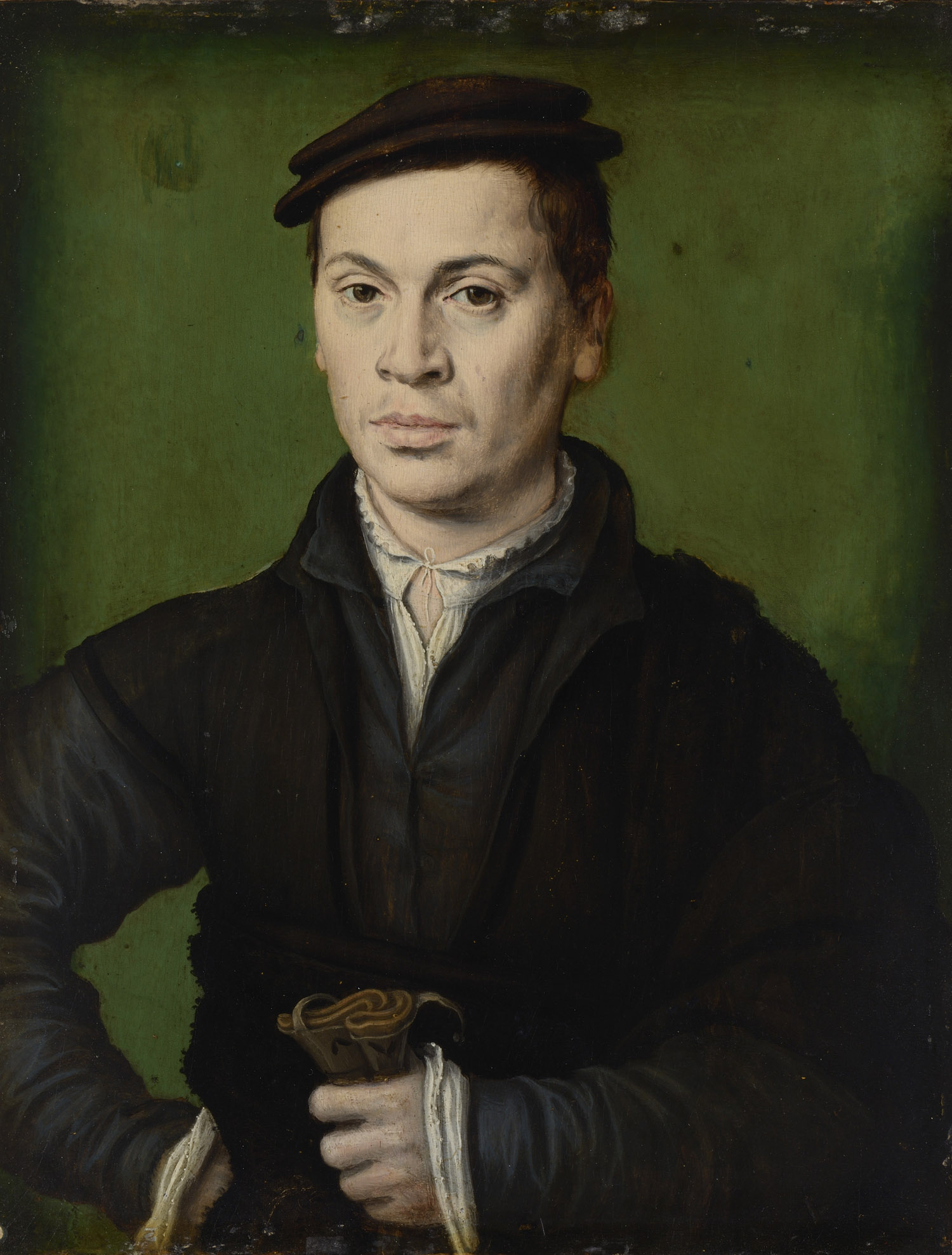
Portrait of an Unknown Gentleman by Corneille de Lyon

Portrait of an Unknown Gentleman or Man in a Black Beret Holding a Pair of Gloves is a 1530s oil on panel painting by the French artist Corneille de Lyon. Formerly in the collection of Robin Benson, it is now in the Museum of Fine Arts of Lyon, which bought it in 2014.

== Sources ==
- http://blogs.mediapart.fr/blog/horus/271015/corneille-de-lyon-entre-au-musee-des-beaux-arts
