= Martin Bradley (painter) =

British painter (1931–2023)

Martin Bradley (1931 – 24 April 2023) was a British painter.

== Biography ==
Martin James Bradley was born in Richmond in SW London, England on 11 April 1931. He attended St Paul's School, but ran away to sea aged 14, serving as a cabin boy. Martin married his first wife in the 1950s and has two children and three grandchildren from this marriage. He married his second wife in 1975. He held his first solo exhibition in 1954 at Gimpel Fils, then exhibiting at Gallery One and the Redfern Gallery in London. In the early 1960s, he exhibited at the Rive Gauche Gallery in Paris a number of times. London galleries that continue to champion his work include The Nine, Crane Kalman, England & Co and the Grosvenor Gallery in conjunction with James Huntington-Whiteley Fine Art.

Bradley is known for abstract and symbolic artworks, influenced by the calligraphy of China and Japan, as well as Buddhism, to which he converted.

Bradley's works are held in the Tate Gallery collections in London, UK, and the Museum of Modern Art in New York, USA. His works have been collected by Dame Barbara Hepworth, Sir Roland Penrose, and Sir Herbert Read. He has been exhibited by the Paisnel Gallery in London.

Bradley died on 24 April 2023.
