= Portrait of a Lady (said to be Anne Stuart, Maréchale d'Aubigny) =

Painting by Corneille de Lyon

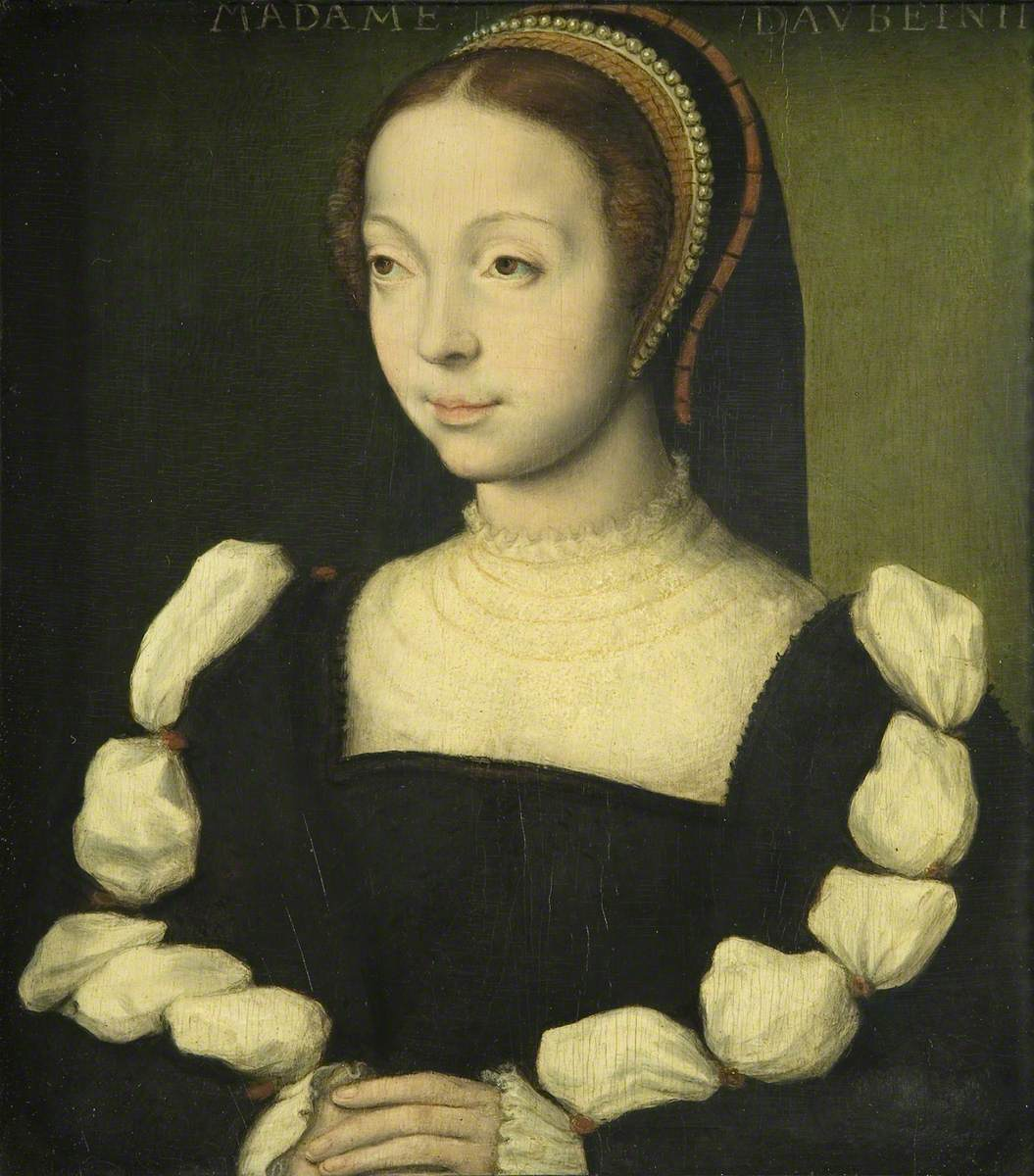
Bristol version

Portrait of a Lady (said to be Anne Stuart, Maréchale d'Aubigny) is an oil on panel painting by Corneille de Lyon, from c. 1533-1536. It is known in three versions. It depicts Anne Stuart, wife of her cousin Robert Stewart, 5th Lord of Aubigny and lady-in-waiting of Queen Eleanor.

The earliest of the three versions has the dimensions of 21 cm by 16 cm and is now in the Louvre Museum (where it is sometimes identified as Anne de la Queille or Jacqueline de Rohan Gye.) The second measures 18 cm by 15.8 cm and is in Bristol City Museum and Art Gallery, and the third is 21 cm by 16 cm and is in the Musée de l'Histoire de France in Versailles.
