= London Art Fair =

Annual art fair in London, England

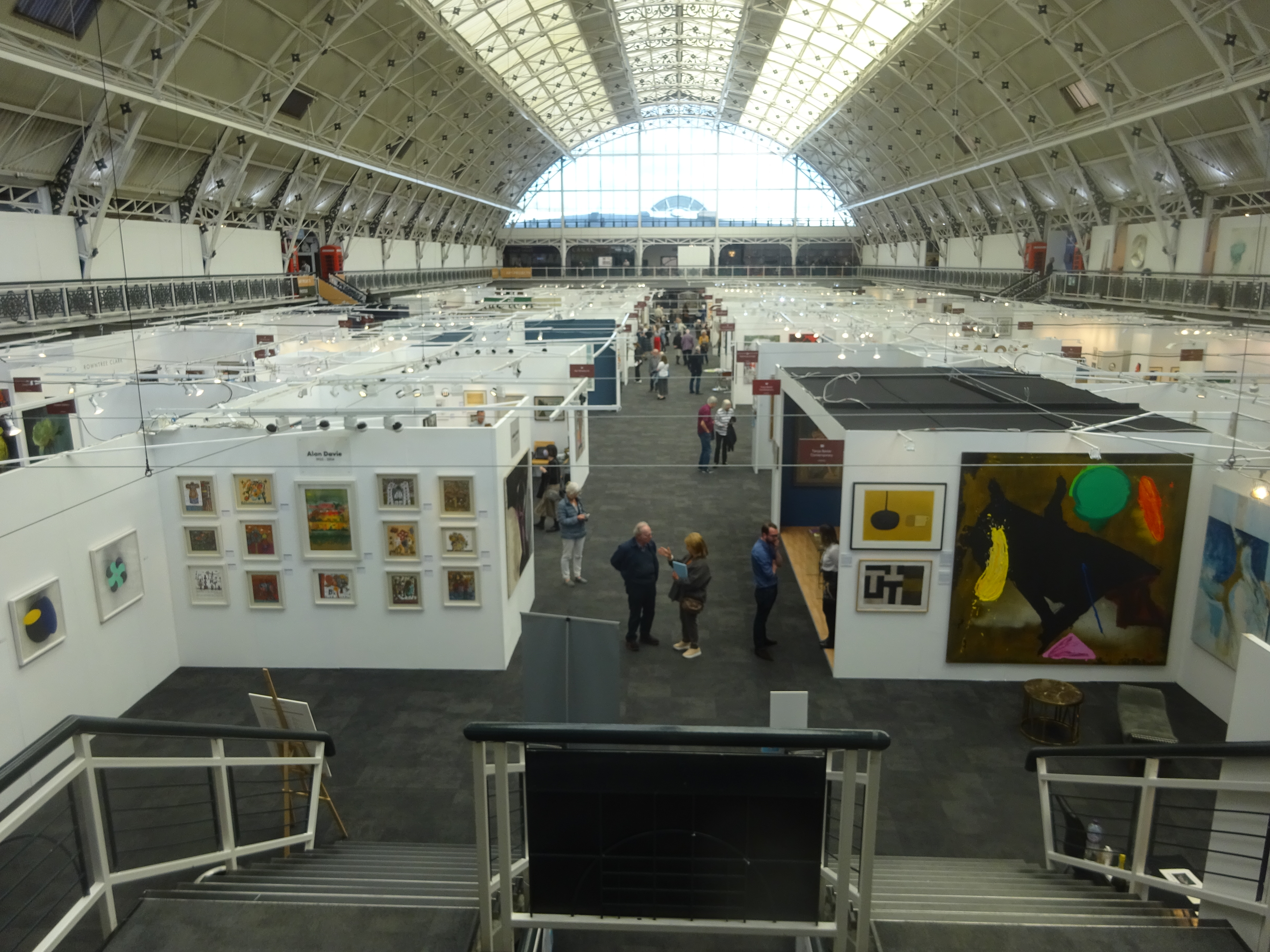
- Internal view at the Business Design Centre, April 2022
- Genre: Art fair; focuses on modern British and contemporary art
- Date: Normally January
- Frequency: Annually
- Locations: Business Design Centre, Islington, London, England
- Coordinates: 51.5355°N 0.1056°W
- Years active: 1989 – ongoing
- Most recent: 22–26 January 2025
- Previous event: 22–26 January 2020; 20–24 April 2022; 18–22 January 2023; 17–21 January 2024; 22–26 January 2025
- Next event: 21–25 January 2026
- Participants: 100+
- Organiser: Immediate Live
- Website: www.londonartfair.co.uk

The London Art Fair (LAF) is an annual contemporary art fair held at the Business Design Centre in Islington, London.

The most recent fair was held 21 - 25 January 2026, with previews on 20 January 2026.

== Overview ==
The fair displays modern British and contemporary art, from the early 20th century onwards, presented by galleries and private collectors. Alongside over 125 participating galleries in the main fair, there are two curated sections focusing on younger galleries and new work with art projects and contemporary photography with Photo50.

The 2019 fair was held during 16–20 January 2019. After a gap, the 34th fair was held during 20–24 April 2022, postponed from January due to the COVID-19 pandemic. In 2023, the fair returned to its normal timing, 18–22 January 2023.

The London Art Fair is one of a number of art fairs in London.

The 2026 edition of the London Art Fair, once again ensconced within Islington’s Business Design Centre, hosted over one hundred modern and contemporary art galleries, many focusing on Surrealism, one of the 2026 Fair's key themes, as well as an accompanying programme of talks, tours, and events.

== See also ==
- British Art Fair
- London Art Week

== Gallery ==
Views at the London Art Fair
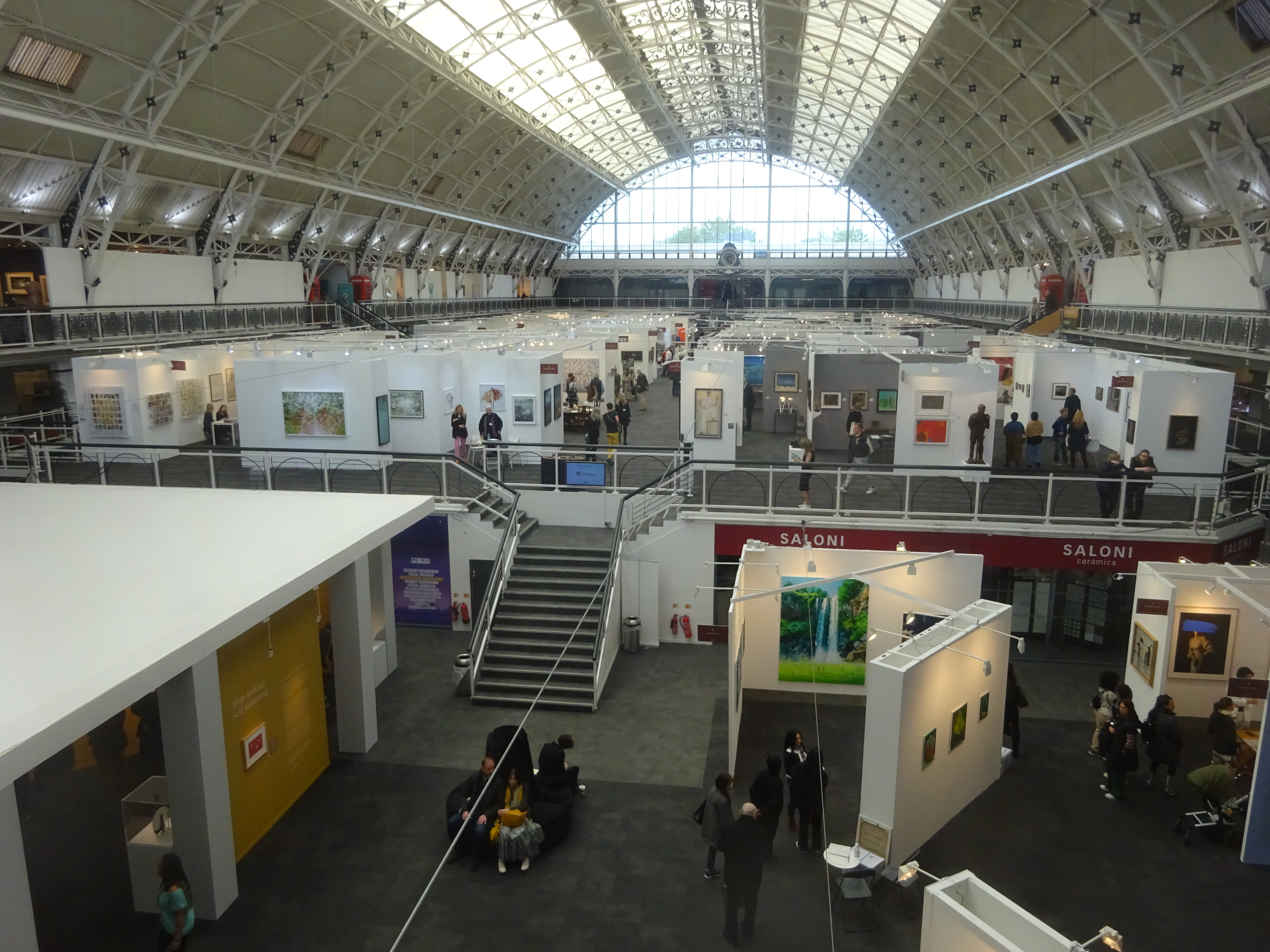
Exhibition stands at the 2022 London Art Fair

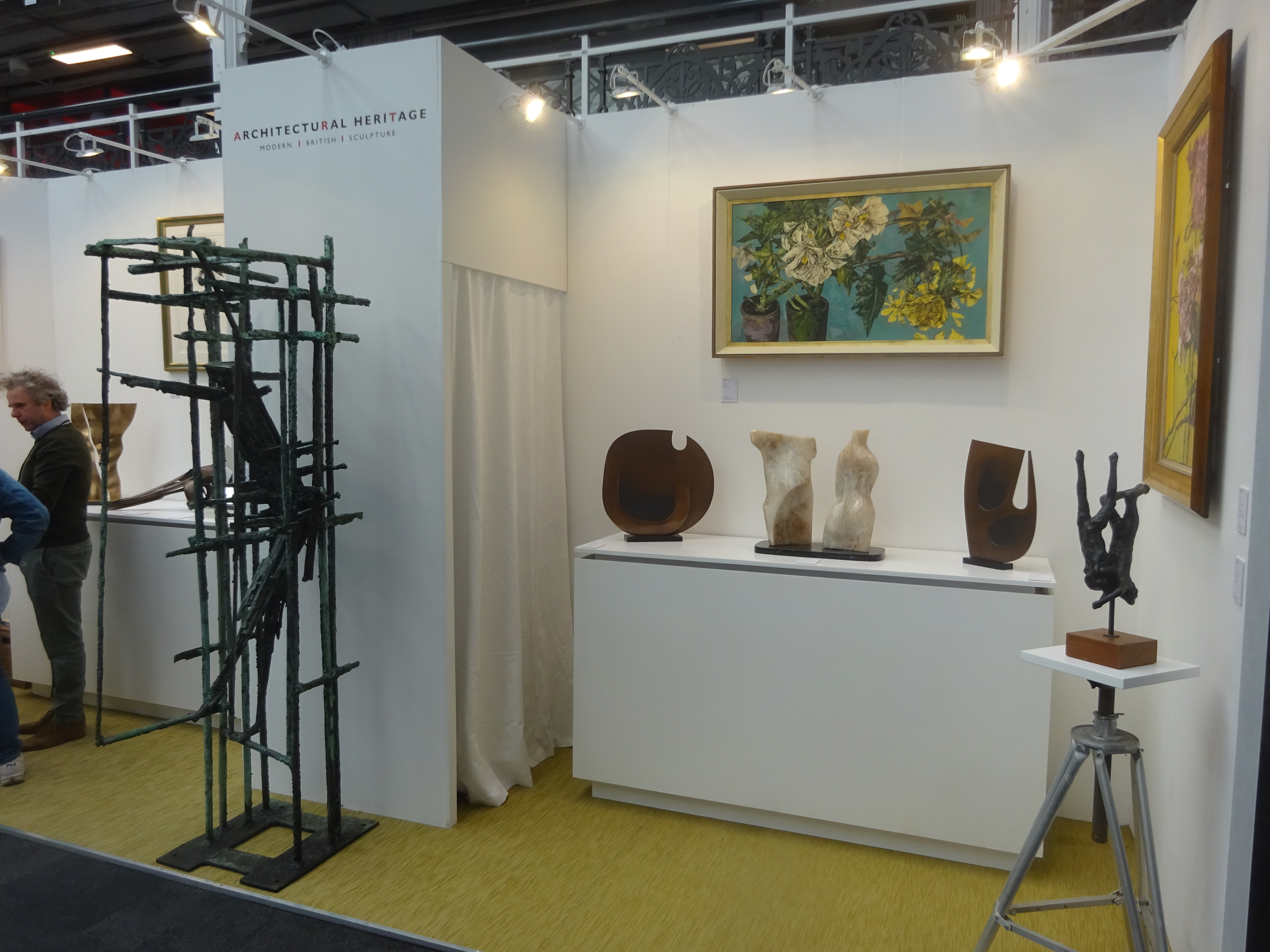
Architectural Heritage stand at the 2022 fair

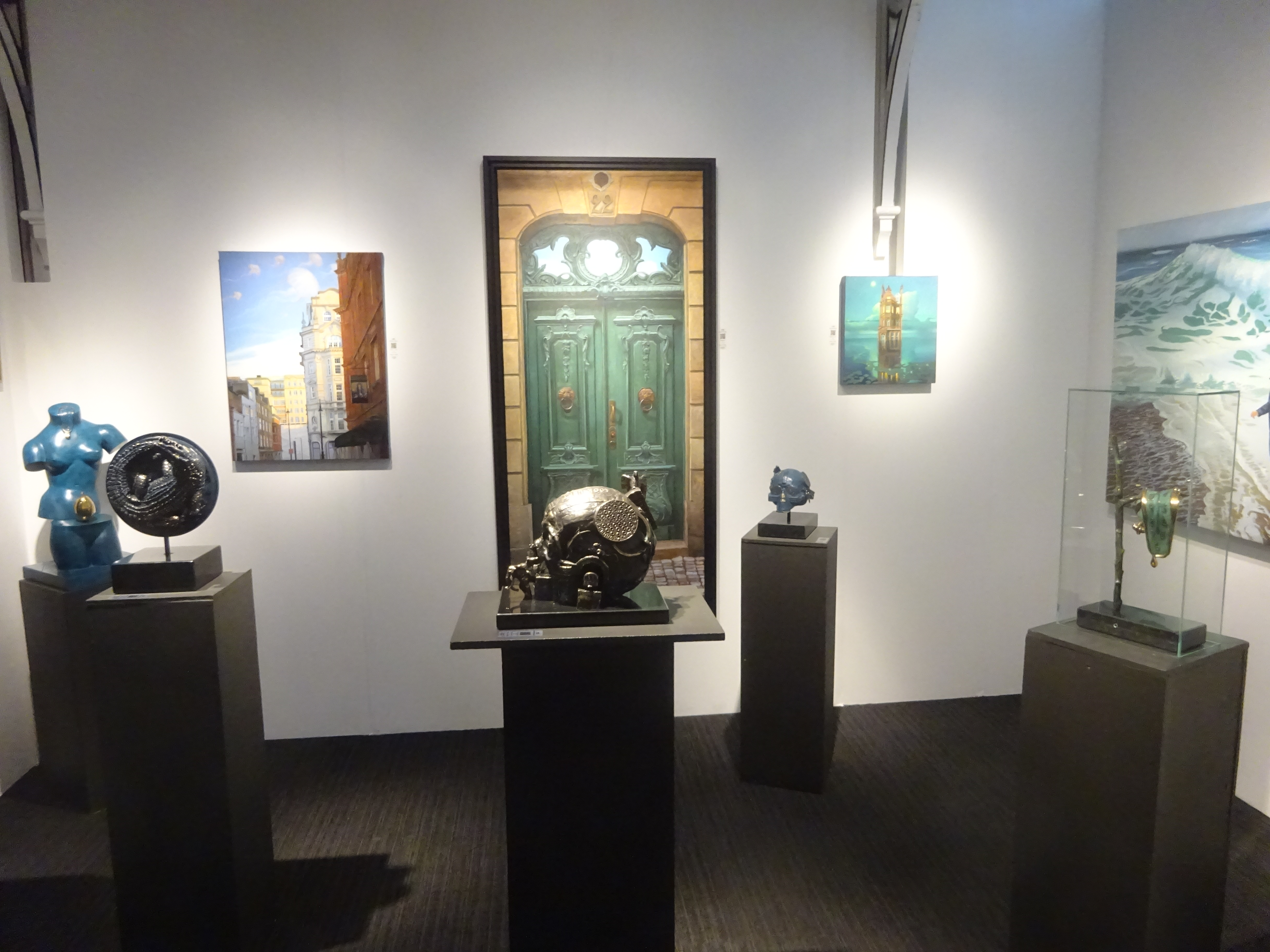
Mollbrink's Art Gallery stand at the 2022 fair, including artworks by Alexander Klingspor

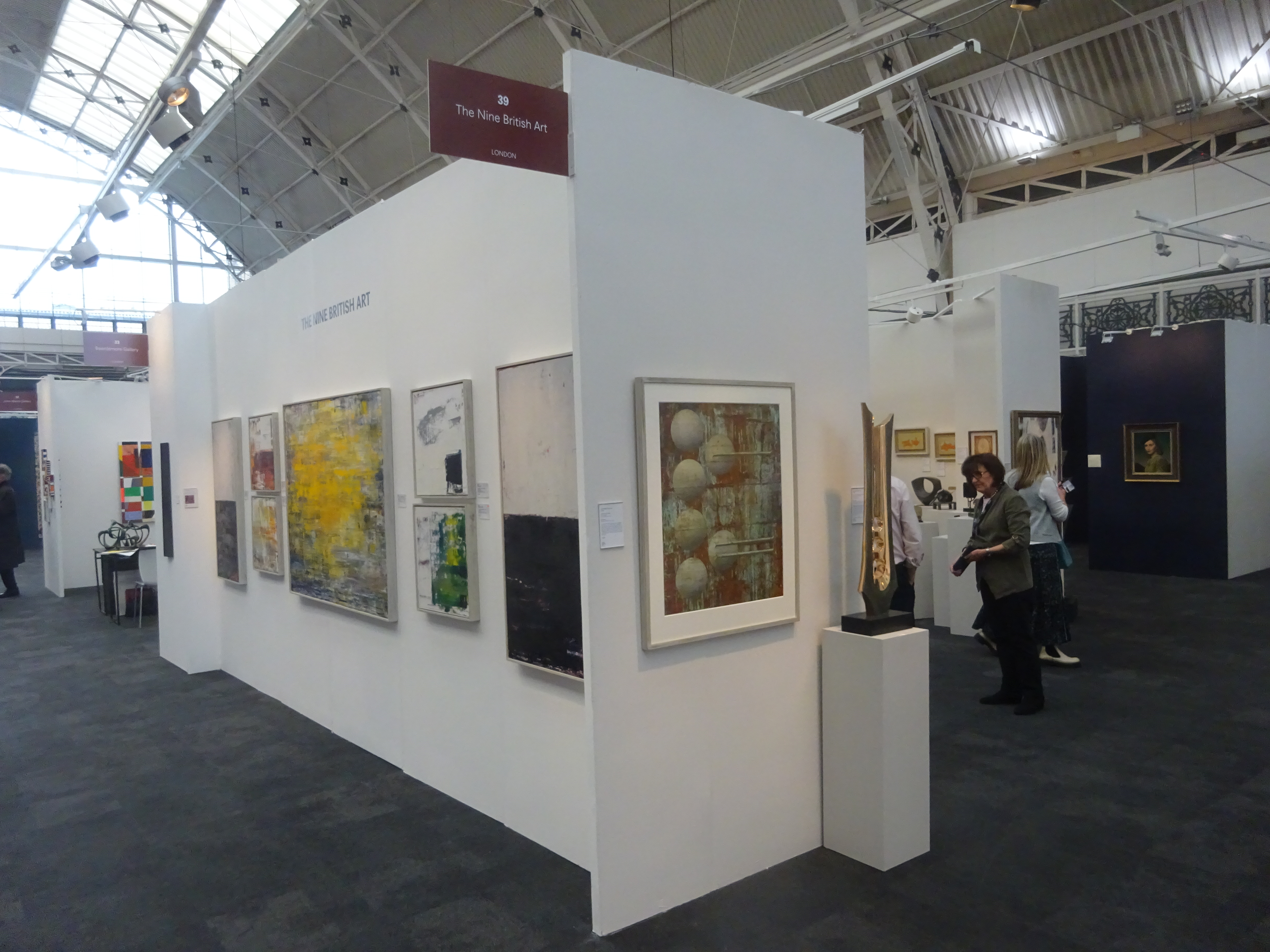
The Nine British Art stand at the 2022 fair

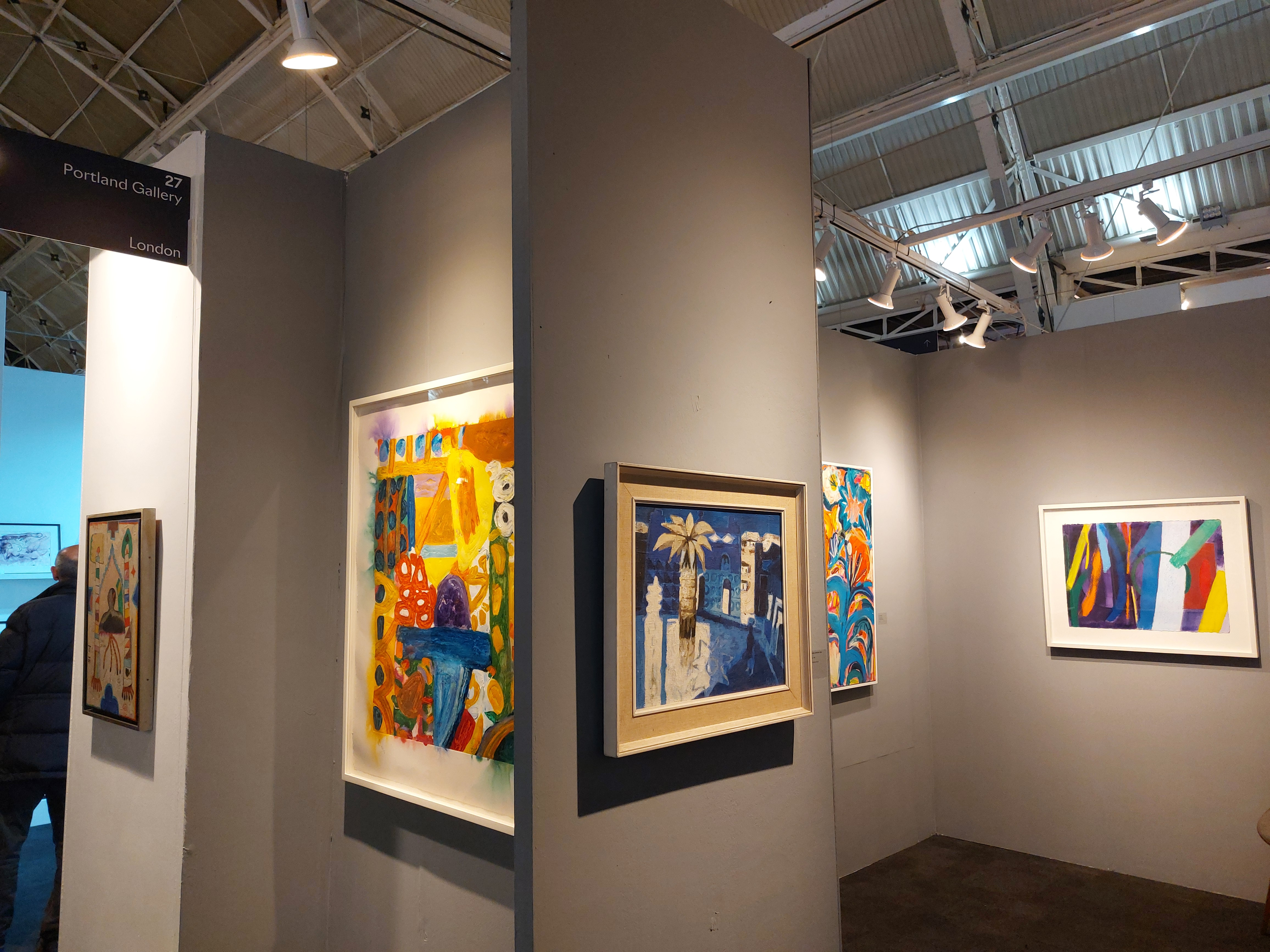
Portland Gallery stand at the 2024 fair
