= Affordable Art Fair =

Internationalco ntemporary art fair

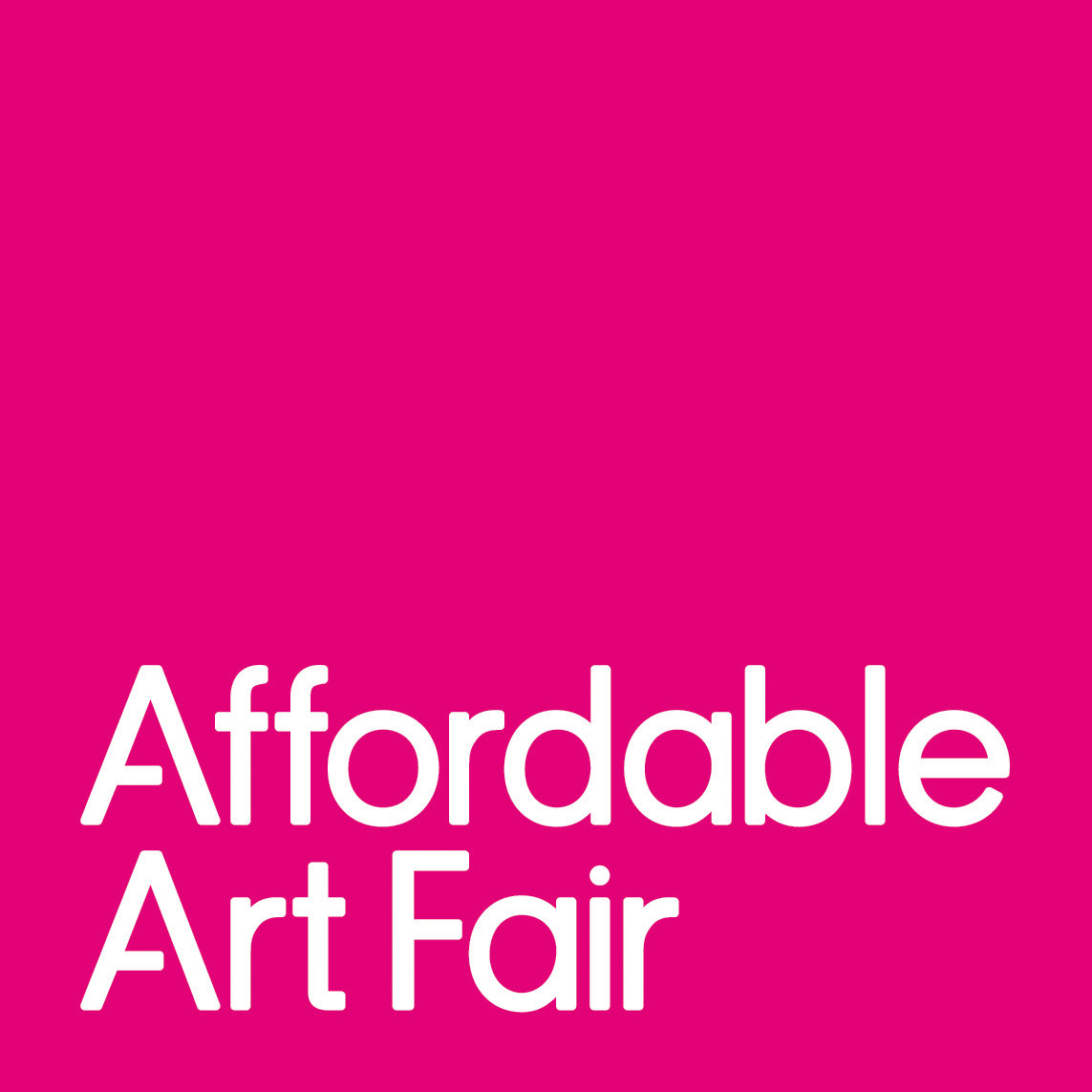

Affordable Art Fair is an international, contemporary art fair held in nine countries around the world. Launched in Battersea Park, London, England, in 1999, Affordable Art Fair is an international event in thirteen cities: London, Amsterdam, Brussels, Berlin, Hamburg, Stockholm, New York, Austin, Hong Kong, Singapore, Sydney, Brisbane, and Melbourne. In 2025, Affordable Art Fair will appear in Vienna, Austria and in Boston, Massachusetts, US.

The fairs take place annually, with the exceptions of Battersea and New York, which hold spring and autumn editions that run across four days. Affordable Art Fairs showcase talks, programs, and artist-led workshops, and most also provide art-based activities for children.

Founded by Will Ramsay, Affordable Art Fair was organized as an alternative to the traditional gallery scene. With its price ceiling of £7,500/€10,000/$12,000, the fairs aim to appeal to and make art accessible to all. The fairs attract over 200,000 visitors each year.

In 2024, Affordable Art Fair celebrates its 25th anniversary.

== History ==
The first fair was launched in Battersea Park in London in October 1999. Affordable Art Fair presented a second event in Battersea Park to showcase different artists from the October event. In the same year, a fair was presented in Bristol in September.

In 2002, the Affordable Art Fair launched a fair in New York. In 2007, the company began to expand in Europe, starting with a fair in Amsterdam. 2012 saw the Affordable Art Fair launch in five additional cities, and it operated in Hong Kong in 2013. In 2014, for the fourth year in a row, Affordable Art Fair was voted a CoolBrand in the UK, nominated by the British public and the CoolBrand council.

Affordable Art Fair is owned by Ramsay Fairs, which also owns the British Art Fair, a Modern and Contemporary Art fair that takes place every autumn at the Saatchi Gallery in London, and VOLTA, an art fair in Switzerland (Basel) and the USA (New York).

In 2020, in-person fairs were cancelled and went online due to the pandemic. The fairs returned as in-person events in 2021.

== Charitable work ==
According to Affordable Art Fair, it has donated over £1 million since 1999. In 2016, the company unified its approach to charitable work by ensuring that every fair worked with an Art Therapy charity. As well as donating money, the events provide a platform on which charities can raise awareness of their activities, fundraise, and connect with new supporters. They have worked with The Sovereign Art Foundation and North London Hospice.
