= Vs. (magazine) =

- Kylie Minogue on the cover of Vs.
- Categories: fashion
- Frequency: Biannual
- Founder: Jakob F. Stubkjær and Vibe Dabelsteen
- Founded: 2005
- Country: USA
- Based in: New York City
- Language: English
- Website: vsmag.com

Vs. is an international fashion and lifestyle magazine published twice per year. Featuring sleek design, luxury fashion stories, editorial edge, and large format, glossy, print size, Vs. was founded by Jakob F. Stubkjær and Vibe Dabelsteen in 2005. Vs.'s offices are based in New York, United States.

Vs. features some of the most prominent figures in fashion and mainstream culture from supermodels and celebrities to emerging talents within fashion, beauty, music, art, film and culture. Every issue has four different covers. Fall/Winter 2010 featured Naomi Campbell, Eva Mendes, Christina Ricci and Rachel Weisz on the front cover, and the Spring/Summer 2011 issues featured Kylie Minogue, Sky Ferreira, Paris Hilton and Oh Land

Vsmagazinelive.com is the LIVE edition of the printed magazine. With all the notions of web exploited, that is the motion, the audio, the pace, the form. Vsmagazinelive.com features new content every day from historic film clips to exclusive Vs. fashion productions, daily style and fashion news, as well as trends, industry and cultural updates.

Headquarters in NYC

== Models ==
The following models and talent have featured on the front covers of Vs. Magazine.

- Spring/Summer 2009 featured Emma Watson, Lou Doillon and Milla Jovovich.
- Fall/Winter 2009 featured Drew Barrymore, Juliette Lewis and Elliot Page.
- Spring/Summer 2010 featured Claudia Schiffer Vanessa Paradis, Bar Refaeli and Claire Danes.
- Fall/Winter 2010 featured Naomi Campbell, Eva Mendes, Christina Ricci and Rachel Weisz.
- Spring/Summer 2011 featured Kylie Minogue, Sky Ferreira, Paris Hilton and Oh Land.
- Fall/Winter 2011 featured Kirsten Dunst, Laetitia Casta and Amber Heard.
- Spring/Summer 2012 features Julianne Moore, Erin Wasson, Rosie Huntington-Whiteley, Elizabeth Olsen, Shailene Woodley, Helena Christensen.
