= Jonathan S Hooper =

British painter and sculptor (born 1962)

- Born: 1962 (age 63–64)
- Education: Imperial College London
- Known for: Abstract painting, Landscape painting, Sculpture, Contemporary art
- Website: www.jonathanshooper.com

Jonathan S Hooper (born 1962) is a British painter and sculptor.

Jonathan Hooper was brought up in Cornwall, southwest England, in the 1960s. His father, Harry Hooper, was also a painter. He studied structural engineering at university, followed by a master's degree from Imperial College London.

Hooper worked in Japan for three years. After returning from Japan, Hooper worked on painting and sculpture, influenced by his interest in Japanese calligraphy and printing techniques. Hooper has held exhibitions at The Nine British Art and elsewhere. He has also produced books.

== Books ==
- Hooper, Jonathan S (2019). Sea Roads of the Moor. Blurb. ISBN 978-0368521737.
- Hooper, Jonathan S (2019). Polaroids. Blurb. ISBN 978-0368569821.
