= British Art Fair =

Annual art fair in London, England

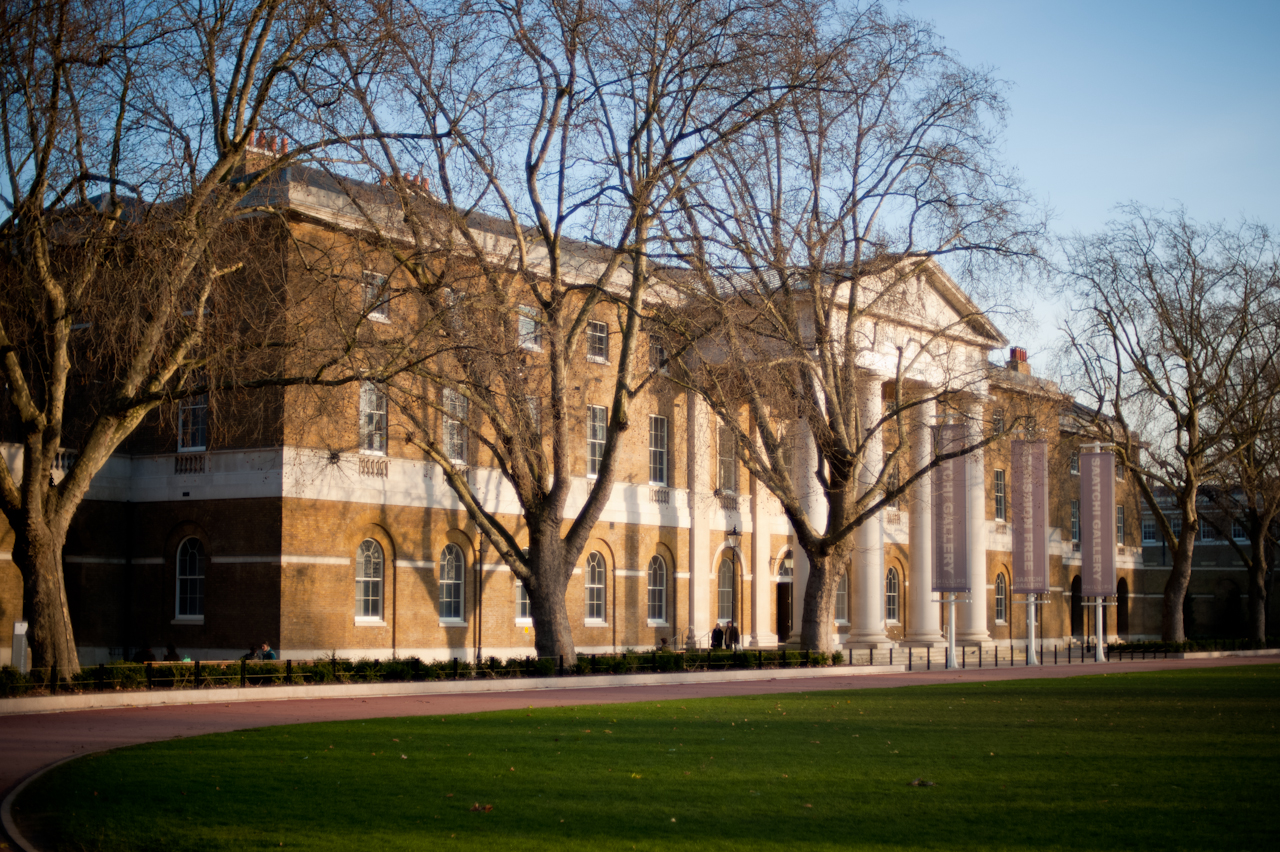
- The Saatchi Gallery in London, location of the British Art Fair since 2018.
- Genre: Art fair; focuses on modern British and contemporary art
- Date: Normally September
- Frequency: Annually
- Locations: Saatchi Gallery, Chelsea, London, England
- Coordinates: 51.4906°N 0.1589°W
- Years active: 1988 – ongoing
- Most recent: 25-28 September 2025
- Next event: 24–27 September 2026
- Website: www.britishartfair.co.uk

British Art Fair is a London-based art fair presenting modern, post-war and contemporary British art.

The fair was founded by Gay Hutson in 1988, and most of the major names in British art in the 20th and 21st centuries have been represented. Much of the work is privately sourced and fresh to the market, with dealers keeping work back for the fair.

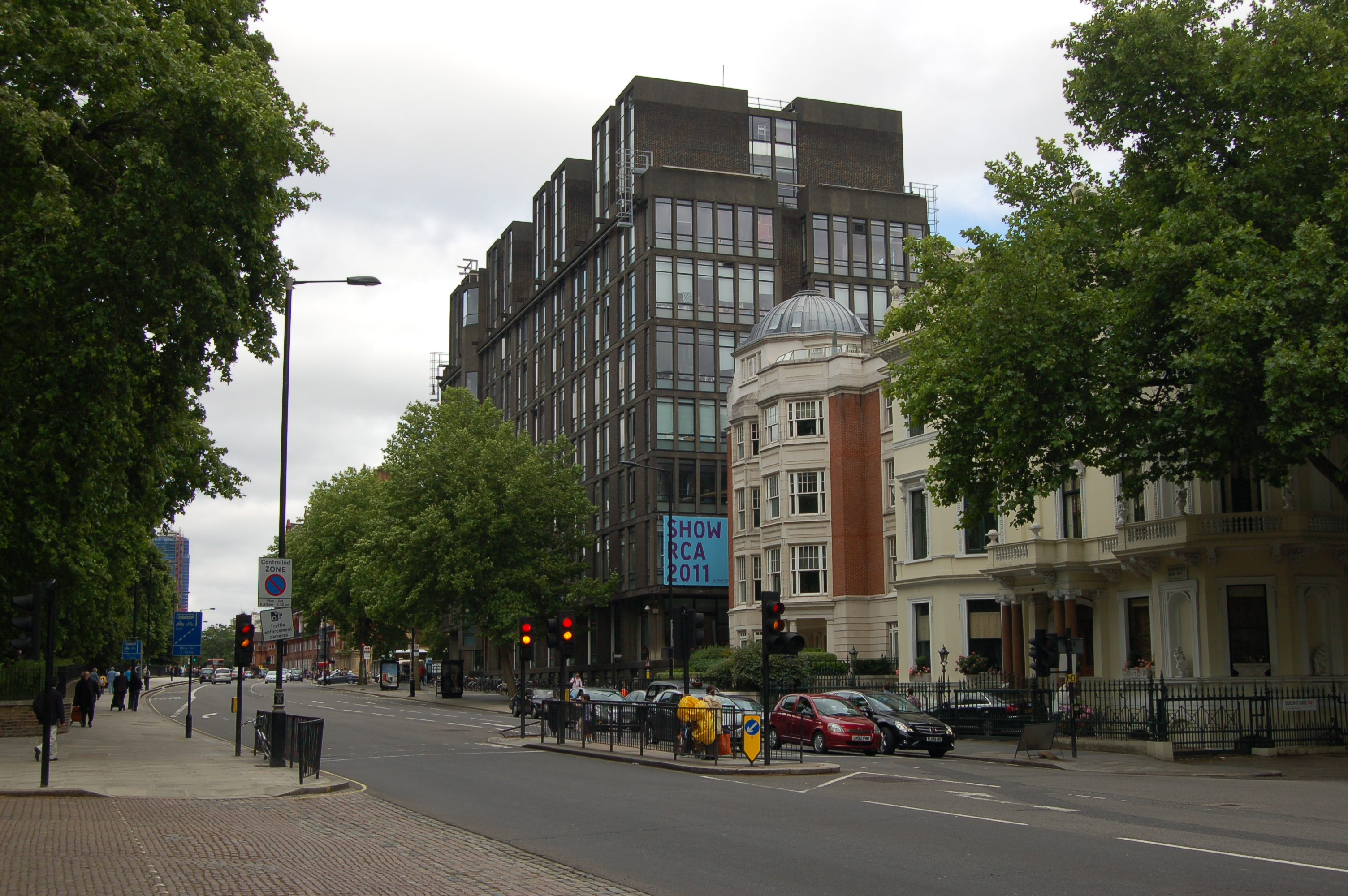
The Royal College of Art, location of the 20/21 British Art Fair until 2015.

A number of galleries exhibit at the fair each year. In the past, the fair was held at the Royal College of Art in South Kensington, west London, in September each year. In 2012, the fair celebrated its 25th anniversary. Due to a loss of availability of the venue, it was cancelled in 2016, but in June 2017 it was held at the Mall Galleries in St James's, central London.

In 2018, the art fair moved to Saatchi Gallery at the Duke of York's HQ, which has since become the fair's new home.

In 2022, British Art Fair took place under the Ramsay Fairs umbrella for the first time. Founded by Will Ramsay, Ramsay Fairs is one of the biggest art fair organisers globally, with a portfolio of art fairs that includes Affordable Art Fair, VOLTA and British Art Fair.

== See also ==
- London Art Fair
