= London Art Week =

London Art Week is a cooperative of approved art galleries and auction houses situated in the Mayfair and St James's district of central London, England, that deal in pre-contemporary art, Old Masters and antiquities.

London Art Week is partnered with The European Fine Art Fair or TEFAF in Maastricht and New York City. Unlike Frieze Art Fair, it does not take place in a temporary tent construction, but within bricks and mortar art galleries in a small geographical district of central London.

London Art Week was launched in 2013 as a marketing platform to unite Master Drawings London (established in 2001), Master Drawings and Sculpture Week (established in 2013) and Master Paintings Week (established in 2009). The founding director is Crispian Riley-Smith and the London Art Week company was incorporated as a not-for-profit limited company in 2017.

In 2017, London Art Week launched a December event to add to the longstanding July event.

London Art Week is partnered by The National Gallery, The Fitzwilliam Museum, The Ashmolean Museum Oxford, The Wallace Collection and Sir John Soane Museum London.

== Art history talks ==
London Art Week organises specialist talks by art historians and experts within several of the member galleries. In 2017, speakers included Lennox Cato, Joanna Tinworth, exhibitions curator at Sir John Soane Museum, and Adam Lowe, Director of Factum Arte, Jane Munro, curator of the Fitzwilliam Museum and Robert Bracey of The British Museum, co-curator of the Ashmolean Museum exhibition Imagining the Divine. There are also practical talks on legal issues to consider when buying art by specialist legal firms specialising in the fine art sector.
