= 2022 in China =

- Decades: 2000s; 2010s; 2020s
- See also: Other events of 2022; History of China • Timeline • Years

Events in the year 2022 in China.

== Incumbents ==
- General Secretary of the Chinese Communist Party – Xi Jinping
- President – Xi Jinping
- Vice President – Wang Qishan
- Premier – Li Keqiang
- Congress chairman – Li Zhanshu
- Consultative Conference chairman – Wang Yang
- Director of the National Supervisory Commission – Yang Xiaodu

=== Communist Party secretaries ===
Post	Name
Secretary of the Beijing Municipal Communist Party Committee	Cai Qi
Secretary of the Tianjin Municipal Communist Party Committee	Li Hongzhong
Secretary of the Shanghai Municipal Communist Party Committee	Li Qiang; Chen Jining
Secretary of the Chongqing Municipal Communist Party Committee	Chen Min'er
Secretary of the Anhui Province Communist Party Committee	Li Jinbin; Zheng Shanjie
Secretary of the Fujian Province Communist Party Committee	Yin Li
Secretary of the Gansu Province Communist Party Committee	Lin Duo; Yin Hong
Secretary of the Guangdong Province Communist Party Committee	Li Xi
Secretary of the Guizhou Province Communist Party Committee	Shen Yiqin
Secretary of the Hainan Province Communist Party Committee	Shen Xiaoming
Secretary of the Hebei Province Communist Party Committee	Wang Dongfeng
Secretary of the Heilongjiang Province Communist Party Committee	Xu Qin
Secretary of the Henan Province Communist Party Committee	Lou Yangsheng
Secretary of the Hubei Province Communist Party Committee	Ying Yong
Secretary of the Hunan Province Communist Party Committee	Zhang Qingwei
Secretary of the Jiangsu Province Communist Party Committee	Wu Zhenglong
Secretary of the Jiangxi Province Communist Party Committee	Yi Lianhong
Secretary of the Jilin Province Communist Party Committee	Jing Junhai
Secretary of the Liaoning Province Communist Party Committee	Zhang Guoqing
Secretary of the Qinghai Province Communist Party Committee	Wang Jianjun
Secretary of the Shaanxi Province Communist Party Committee	Liu Guozhong
Secretary of the Shandong Province Communist Party Committee	Li Ganjie
Secretary of the Shanxi Province Communist Party Committee	Lin Wu
Secretary of the Sichuan Province Communist Party Committee	Peng Qinghua
Secretary of the Yunnan Province Communist Party Committee	Ruan Chengfa; Wang Ning
Secretary of the Zhejiang Province Communist Party Committee	Yuan Jiajun
Secretary of the Inner Mongolia Autonomous Region Communist Party Committee	Shi Taifeng
Secretary of the Guangxi Autonomous Region Communist Party Committee	Lu Xinshe; Liu Ning
Secretary of the Tibet Autonomous Region Communist Party Committee	Wu Yingjie; Wang Junzheng
Secretary of the Ningxia Autonomous Region Communist Party Committee	Chen Run'er
Secretary of the Xinjiang Autonomous Region Communist Party Committee	Ma Xingrui

=== Governors ===
Post	Name
Governor of Anhui Province	Wang Qingxian
Governor of Fujian Province	Wang Ning
Governor of Gansu Province	Ren Zhenhe
Governor of Guangdong Province	Wang Weizhong
Governor of Guizhou Province	Li Bingjun
Governor of Hainan Province	Feng Fei
Governor of Hebei Province	Xu Qin
Governor of Heilongjiang Province	Hu Changsheng
Governor of Henan Province	Wang Kai
Governor of Hubei Province	Wang Zhonglin
Governor of Hunan Province	Mao Weiming
Governor of Jiangsu Province	Wu Zhenglong
Governor of Jiangxi Province	Wu Zhenglong
Governor of Jilin Province	Han Jun
Governor of Liaoning Province	Liu Ning
Governor of Qinghai Province	Xin Changxing
Governor of Shaanxi Province	Zhao Yide
Governor of Shandong Province	Zhou Naixiang
Governor of Shanxi Province	Lan Fo'an
Governor of Sichuan Province	Huang Qiang
Governor of Yunnan Province	Chen Hao
Governor of Zhejiang Province	Wang Hao

== Events ==
In 2022, China passed both the US and the European Union in the number of high-impact research papers published.

=== January–March ===
- 9 January – Tianjin begins city-wide COVID-19 testing for 14 million people after 20 children and adults tested positive for COVID-19, two of whom were infected with the SARS-CoV-2 Omicron variant.
- 4–20 February – 2022 Winter Olympics in Beijing
- 1 March:
  - 2022 Shanghai COVID-19 outbreak
  - A new online religion management law enforced: People and organization no longer allowed to spread religious ideas on the Internet unless they are authorized by the government. The law was passed in December 2021 and went into force on 1 March 2022.
  - 90th anniversary of establishment of Manchukuo
- 4–13 March – 2022 Winter Paralympics in Beijing
- 21 March – China Eastern Airlines Flight 5735 descended steeply mid–flight and struck the ground at high speed in Teng County, Wuzhou, Guangxi Zhuang Autonomous Region, killing all 123 passengers and 9 crew members.

=== April–June ===
- 11 April – 2,500th anniversary of the death of Confucius
- 29 April – Changsha building collapse
- 12 May – Tibet Airlines Flight 9833
- 1 June – 2022 Ya'an earthquake

=== July–September ===
- 24 August – Hainan announces it will ban the sale of new gasoline-powered cars by 2030.
- 5 September – 2022 Luding earthquake
- 18 September – 2022 Guizhou bus crash

=== October–December ===
- 13 October – A man protests at Sitong Bridge in Haidan District, Beijing
- 16 October – 20th National Congress of the Chinese Communist Party
- 23 October – Xi Jinping is re-elected as General Secretary of the Chinese Communist Party
- 21 November – 2022 Anyang factory fire
- 24 November – 2022 Ürümqi fire
- 24 November – 2022 COVID-19 protests in China

== Deaths ==
- 1 January – Xu Xingchu, 87, engineer, member of the Chinese Academy of Sciences
- 2 January – Zhou Xiaofeng, 57, entrepreneur and politician, member of the National People's Congress (2008–2012)
- 3 January – Zheng Min, 101, poet
- 6 January – Zhang Jiqing, 83, Kunqu artist
- 7 January – Liu Siqi, 91, public figure
- 10 January – Liu Xianping, 83, writer
- 12 January – Sun Bigan, 80, diplomat, ambassador to Saudi Arabia (1990–1994), Iraq (1994–1998) and Iran (1999–2002)
- 5 February — Guo Pingtan, 89, politician, member of the National People's Congress
- 6 February — Chang Feng, 98, actor
- 4 March — Wang Bei, 90, actress
- 5 March — Zhang Zhongxian, 96, military officer, political commissar of Guangzhou Military Region (1985-1992)
- 6 March — Mao Yongze, 91, nuclear engineer, member of the Chinese Academy of Engineering.
- 7 March — Teng Jinxian, 84, film director, producer, and screenwriter.
- 13 March — Li Guangxi, 92, operatic tenor
- 15 March— Ma Shaoxin, 86, actor
- 16 March — Chen Jingxiong, 100, engineer, member of the Chinese Academy of Engineering
- 19 March — He Luli, 87, politician and pediatrician, vice chairperson of the CPPCC (1996–1998) and Standing Committee of the NPC (1998–2008)
- 20 March — Wen Shengchang, 100, oceanographer and academic (Ocean University of China), member of the Chinese Academy of Sciences
- 23 March — Zhang Ziyi, 97, zootechnician, member of the Chinese Academy of Engineering
- 24 March — Chen Chengda, 92, football player (Shanghai, national team) and manager
- 26 March — Ba Dai, 91, politician, deputy (1964–1988)
- 26 March — Duan Qing, 68, philologist
- 30 November – Jiang Zemin, 96, politician, General Secretary of the Chinese Communist Party (1989–2002) and 4th paramount leader

== See also ==
=== Country overviews ===
- History of China
- History of modern China
- Outline of China
- Government of China
- Politics of China
- Timeline of Chinese history
- Years in China

== Links ==
- Media related to 2022 in China at Wikimedia Commons
