= 1921 in China =

- Decades: 1900s; 1910s; 1920s; 1930s; 1940s
- See also: Other events of 1921; History of China • Timeline • Years

Events from the year 1921 in China.

== Incumbents ==
- President: Xu Shichang
- Premier: Jin Yunpeng (until 18 December), Yan Huiqing (from 18 to 24 December), Liang Shiyi (from 24 December)

== Events ==
- 3 March – Shipwreck of SS Hong Moh
- 30 May–3 June – The Far Eastern Championship Games are held in Shanghai.
- 23 July–2 August – 1st National Congress of the Chinese Communist Party, which leads to the establishment of the Chinese Communist Party
- 8 August – Establishment of the Vicariate Apostolic of Nganhoei
- Establishment of People's Park, in Guangzhou
- Guangdong–Guangxi War

== Education ==
- Establishment of Hebei University
- Establishment of Xiamen University
- Establishment of Beijing Chen Jing Lun High School
- Establishment of Zhixin High School, in Guangzhou

== Culture ==
- Establishment of Creation Quarterly

== Births ==
=== February ===
- 16 February — Hua Guofeng, 2nd Paramount Leader of China (d. 2008)
- 22 February — Zhuang Nu, lyricist (d. 2016)

=== March ===
- 6 March — D.C. Lau, sinologist (d. 2010)
- Yao Guang, diplomat (d. 2003)

=== April ===
- 18 April — Xu Yuanchong, translator (d. 2021)

=== June ===
- 21 June — Chen Muhua, communist revolutionary and politician (d. 2011)
- 23 June — Wang Quanying, last known surviving Red Army soldier (d. 2026)
- 27 June — Bai Guang, actress and singer (d. 1999)

=== July ===
- 2 July — Joseph Zhu Baoyu, Roman Catholic bishop (d. 2020)
- 26 July — Wang Xiji, aerospace engineer (d. 2026)

=== August ===
- 2 August — Szema Wah Lung, Hong Kong film actor (d. 2012)
- 17 August — Li Huanying, physician (d. 2022)

=== October ===
- Han Peixin, 6th Secretary of the Jiangsu Provincial Committee of the Chinese Communist Party (d. 2017)
- Cao Keqiang, diplomat (d. 1999)

=== November ===
- 12 November — Tsang Tsou-choi, calligraphy artist (d. 2007)
- 15 November — Zhang Xingqian, metal physicist (d. 2022)
- 25 November — Stanley Ho, Hong Kong and Macau billionaire businessman (d. 2020)

=== December ===
- 7 December — Qian Chunqi, doctor and translator (d. 2010)
- 18 December — Sun Daolin, actor and film director (d. 2007)
- 19 December — Wu Xueqian, 6th Minister of Foreign Affairs of China (d. 2008)

=== Unknown dates ===
- Zhao Xiu, politician (d. 1992)

== Deaths ==
- April 14 — Imperial Noble Consort Gongsu, consort of Tongzhi Emperor (b. 1857)
- September 30 — Youlan, consort of Zaifeng, Price Chun (b. 1884)
- October 21 — Zhou Fu, former Viceroy of Liangjiang and Liangguang (b. 1837)
- October 27 — Yan Fu, military officer, newspaper editor, translator and writer (b. 1854)
