= 2026 in China =

- Decades: 2000s; 2010s; 2020s
- See also: Other events of 2026; History of China • Timeline • Years

Events in the year 2026 in China.

== Incumbents ==
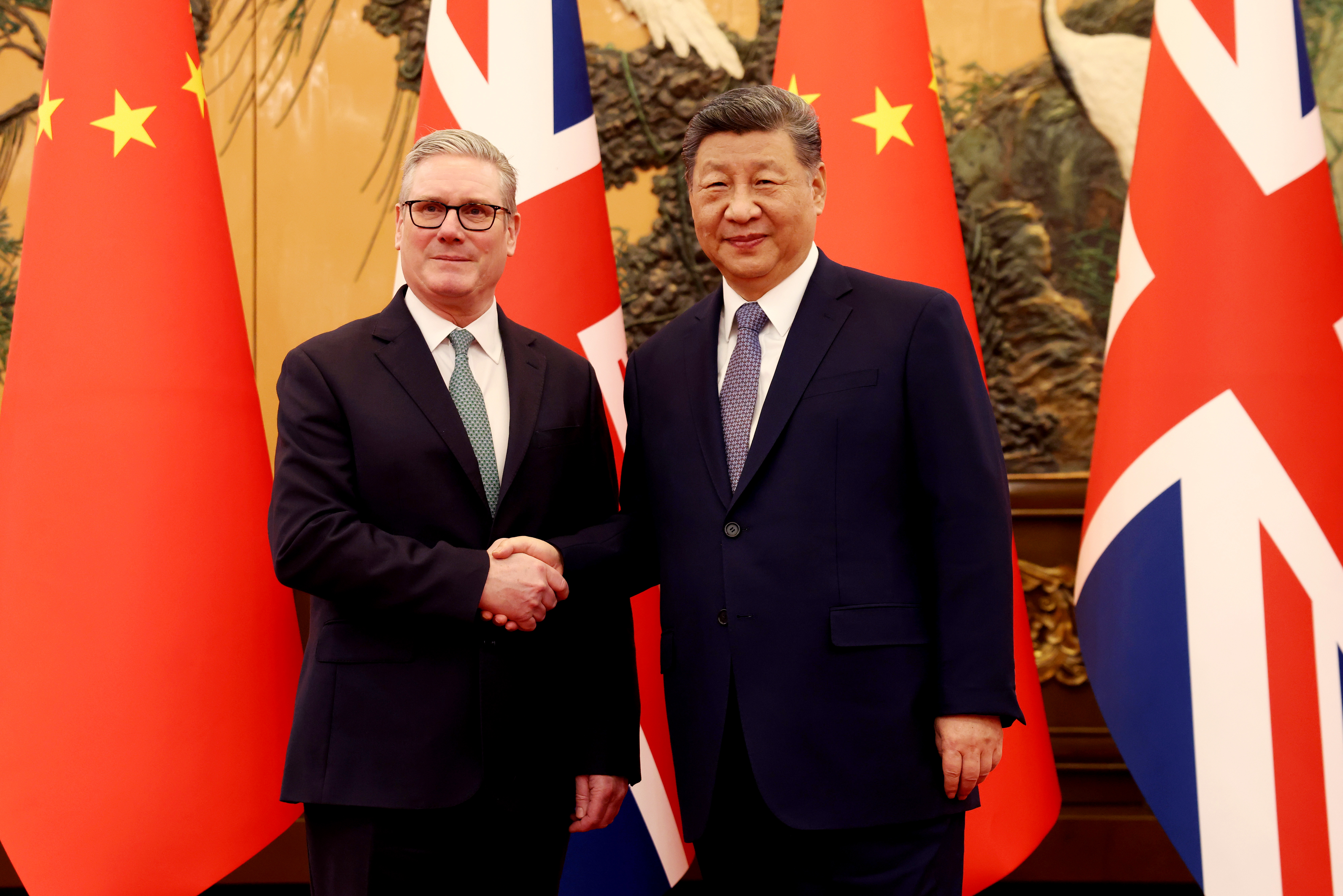
British Prime Minister Keir Starmer shakes hands with Chinese leader Xi Jinping ahead of their meeting in Beijing on 29 January 2026

- General Secretary of the Chinese Communist Party – Xi Jinping
- President – Xi Jinping
- Premier – Li Qiang
- Congress chairman – Zhao Leji
- Consultative Conference chairman – Wang Huning
- Vice President – Han Zheng
- Supervision Commission director – Liu Jinguo

== Events ==
=== January ===
- 2 January – The New York Times reports that Chinese car company BYD Auto has overtaken American company Tesla as the world's largest seller of electric vehicles.
- 6 January – The Ministry of Commerce bans the export of dual-use items, with military applications, to Japan, citing contentious statements made by the Japanese government regarding tensions with Taiwan.
- 7 January – Cross-strait relations: The government bans Taiwanese interior minister Liu Shyh-fang and education minister Cheng Ying-yao and their families from entering the country on allegations of their involvement in the Taiwan independence movement.
- 8 January – Chen Zhi, the founder of Cambodian conglomerate Prince Group, is extradited to China to face charges of cryptocurrency fraud and human trafficking.
- 18 January – Four people are killed while 84 others are injured with six reported missing following an explosion at the Baogang United Steel factory in Baotou.
- 22 January – The Singapore-flagged cargo vessel Devon Bay sinks off Scarborough Shoal in the South China Sea on its way to Guangdong, leaving two crewmembers dead and four others missing.
- 24 January – Vice Chairman of the Central Military Commission, Zhang Youxia and Chief of Staff of the Joint Staff Department of the Central Military Commission, Liu Zhenli are placed under investigation over suspected "serious violations of discipline."
- 29 January –
  - China executes 11 members of the Ming crime family that ran scam centers in Myanmar.
  - The Chinese Football Association imposes lifetime bans on 73 people, including athlete Li Tie and former association president Chen Xuyuan, for involvement in match-fixing.

=== February ===
- 2 February – China executes four members of the Bai crime family that ran scam centers in Myanmar.
- 6 February – The Supreme People’s Court overturns the death sentence issued to Canadian national Robert Lloyd Schellenberg for drug trafficking.
- 7 February – Eight people are killed in an explosion at a biotechnology facility in Shuoyang, Shanxi.
- 15 February – Eight people are killed in an explosion at a fireworks store in Donghai County, Jiangsu.
- 17 February – China grants visa-free entry for 30 days to citizens of Canada and the United Kingdom.
- 18 February – Twelve people are killed in an explosion at a fireworks store in Xiangyang, Hubei.
- 24 February – China imposes export restrictions on 40 Japanese entities accused of contributing to Japanese "remilitarization" efforts.
- 26 February – Nineteen members of the National People's Congress are dismissed due to unspecified reasons.

=== March ===
- 2 March – The Chinese People's Political Consultative Conference votes to remove five of its members following a Standing Committee.
- 12 March –
  - Train services between Beijing and Pyongyang resume after a suspension imposed in 2020 due to the COVID-19 pandemic.
  - The National People's Congress passes a law to promote "ethnic unity" by making the teaching of Mandarin Chinese mandatory throughout the entirety of the compulsory education period, among other provisions.
- 19 March – Authorities announce the arrest of seven people in Hubei on charges of trading fentanyl.
- 29 March – At least eight people are killed in a ramming attack in Fangshan District, Beijing.
- 30 March –
  - Four eight people are killed in an explosion at an under construction tunnel in Wanzhou, Chongqing.
  - In an interview conducted by the magazine People, Chinese Olympic diver Quan Hongchan reveals that she was a target of cyberbullying.

=== April ===
- 2 April – Air China, China Southern Airlines, and its subsidiary XiamenAir increase fuel surcharges by ¥60–120 (US$8.70–17.5) on domestic flights in response to rising oil prices linked to the 2026 Iran war.
- 3 April –
  - The Central Commission for Discipline Inspection announces that Ma Xingrui, the former Party Secretary of Xinjiang, is under investigation over suspected "serious violation of law and discipline", becoming the third member of the Politburo of the Chinese Communist Party to be investigated by the commission.
  - An outbreak of foot-and-mouth disease is declared in Xinjiang.
- 18 April – China lodges a diplomatic complaint alleging that a Royal New Zealand Air Force spy plane violated its airspace over the Yellow Sea and East China Sea. The New Zealand Defence Force denies breaching Chinese airspace, stating that it was monitoring shipping near North Korea as part of a multinational sanctions enforcement team.
- 23 April – Actress Dilraba Dilmurat wins a lawsuit after Beijing Internet Court ruled that Hangzhou Qianyan Wanyu Culture Communication Co., Ltd. and Fuyang Zhishang Culture Media Co., Ltd. infringed her portrait rights by using AI face-swapping technology in paid short dramas, ordering both companies to issue public apologies on Douyin and pay compensation for economic losses and legal expenses.
- 28 April – Flash flooding displaces more than 200 people in Qinzhou, Guangxi.

=== May ===
- 1 May –
  - A ban on the sale and flying of drones in Beijing comes into effect.
  - China lifts tariffs on imports from 20 African countries until 2028.
- 4 May – At least 37 people are killed in explosion at a fireworks factory in Liuyang, Hunan.
- 13–15 May – U.S. President Donald Trump makes a state visit to China and meets with CCP General Secretary Xi Jinping.
- 16 May – A truck falls into a river in Huanjiang Maonan Autonomous County, Guangxi, killing nine people.
- 18 May – A magnitude 5.2 earthquake hits Guangxi, killing two people and injuring four in Liuzhou.
- 19 May – Three people, including two Japanese nationals, are injured in a knife attack at a restaurant in Shanghai.
- 20 May –
  - At least 12 people are reported killed following days of flooding caused by heavy rains in Hunan, Hubei and Guizhou provinces.
  - Russian President Vladimir Putin makes a state visit to China and meets with CCP General Secretary Xi Jinping.
- 21 May – Xu Yao is executed following his conviction for the 2020 murder of Yoozoo Games founder Lin Qi.
- 22 May – At least 82 people are killed in an explosion at a coal mine in Qinyuan County, Shanxi.
- 29 May – A court in Henan convicts Shi Yongxin, the former abbot of the Shaolin Temple, on charges of misappropriation of funds and bribery involving 282 million yuan ($41 million) and sentences him to 24 years' imprisonment.
- 31 May – Five people are killed in a collapse at an illegal mine in Huize County, Yunnan.

=== June ===
- 3 June — The Chinese Government bans four New Zealand MPs from entering the country for a year after they visited Taiwan in May as part of a cross-party parliamentary delegation amid Beijing's One China policy.
- 11 June —
  - The Chinese Government imposes sanctions and an entry ban on Philippine defense secretary Gilbert Teodoro and his family, citing statements made against the country.
  - Seven people are killed in a gas explosion in Xingan, Guangxi.
- 16 June — A magnitude 6.3 earthquake hits Haixi prefecture of Qinghai, killing one person and injuring four others.
- 17 June — The State Administration for Market Regulation approves Paramount Skydance's proposed acquisition of Warner Bros. Discovery.
- 26 June — A small plane crashes into the China Zun in Beijing, killing the sole pilot.
- 28 June — A magnitude 5.2 earthquake hits Gao County in Sichuan, injuring 15 people.

=== July ===
- 5 July — Two people are killed and four injured when a truck carrying ammonium nitrate exploded after colliding with another vehicle in Xilingol League, Inner Mongolia.
- 6 July —
  - A court in Changzhou sentences Yang Youlin, a former city official in Nanjing, to death for taking 2.2 billion yuan ($325 million) in bribes from 1993 to 2023.
  - China test-fires a long-range ballistic missile into the Pacific Ocean.
  - A tornado outbreak hits Huanggang and Ezhou in Hubei, killing 11 people.
  - Thirty-nine people are killed in flooding after Tropical Storm Maysak brings record rainfall to Guangxi. Most of the deaths are in Hengzhou where heavy rains causing breaches and overflows in several dams and reservoirs, killing 26 people.
- 7 July — A landslide strikes Renzang village in Tanchang County, Gansu province, killing 21 forestry workers.
- 8 July — A magnitude 5.0 earthquake hits Gao County in Sichuan, injuring four people and damaging 4,309 homes.
- 9 July — A fire at a shoe factory in Jinjiang, Quanzhou kills 28 people.
- 10 July —
  - China halts helium exports.
  - CASC successfully launches the first flight of the Long March 10B rocket. The first-stage booster is recovered using a net-based system.
- 17 July — Sixty-one people are reported dead and missing in a landslide at Pengshui County, Chongqing.
- 20 July — An officer of the Philippine Navy is injured after being struck by a baton by China Coast Guard personnel during a confrontation at Second Thomas Shoal in the South China Sea.
- 21 July — A magnitude 4.9 earthquake hits Yunnan, damaging 221 homes.
- 24 July – The United States imposes a 12.5% tariff on China, citing the presence of alleged forced labor in the supply chain.
- 25 July – The porcelain-making sites of Jingdezhen are designated as UNESCO World Heritage Sites.
- 26 July – Ten people are killed and 23 injured in a flash flood at the Shuangshimen Scenic Area in Weiyuan County, Gansu.

=== August ===
- 6 August – A magnitude 4.9 earthquake hits Sichuan, killing one person and injuring six others.
- 10 August – An attempt to launch the ChinaSat 4B satellite aboard a Long March 7A rocket fails after the latter malfunctions during its flight from Hainan.
- 19 August – The first stage of the reusable rocket Zhuque-3 is recovered on land by China for the first time.
- 20 August – A court in Shenzhen sentences Evergrande founder Hui Ka Yan to life imprisonment for financial crimes.
- 26 August – At least 43 people are killed following a flash flood along the border between the Tibet Autonomous Region and Nepal.
- 28 August – Former Hubei party chief Jiang Chaoliang is sentenced to death with a two-year reprieve for taking bribes of up to 746 million yuan ($110 million).

=== September ===
- 2 September – Egypt and China sign an agreement to begin the third stage of the Egyptian-Chinese industrial zone on the Suez Canal.
- 3 September – Six people are killed in a fire at a restaurant in Haikou.
- 5 September – Twelve people are killed while 11 others are wounded in a mudslide in Suichuan County, Jiangxi following days of torrential rain caused by tropical cyclone Saudel.
- 8 September – Former Shanxi governor Jin Xiangjun is sentenced to death with a two-year reprieve for taking bribes of up to 148 million yuan ($21.8 million).
- 10 September – The Liberia-flagged cargo vessel Queen Melody catches fire while undergoing repairs at a shipyard in Qingdao, killing 25 people.
- 14 September – Multiple people are injured in a stabbing in Guangzhou.
- 16–17 September – The Pakistan-China Boundary Joint Commission is formally inaugurated in Islamabad.
- 18 September – China vetoes a US proposal for UN experts to continue monitoring UN sanctions on Iran over its nuclear program.
- 20 September – Eight people are killed in a fire at a textile factory in Foshan, Guangdong.
- 23 September – A Mahan Air aircraft lands in the country despite a US threat of removing from the dollar system if any nation allows Iranian airlines to land in their territory.
- 29 September – Starbucks, an American multinational coffeehouse and roastery chain, opens two stores in Urumqi, Xinjiang amid criticism over the CCP's persecution of Uyghurs and other Turkic Muslim minorities in Xinjiang, including forced labor.

=== October ===
- 12 October – The new Huanggang Port between mainland China and Hong Kong commences operations.
- 14 October – The New Yalu River Bridge connecting North Korea and China is inaugurated between Sinuiju and Dandong across the Yalu River.
- 22 October – A magnitude 7.0 earthquake hits Baqên County in the Tibet Autonomous Region, killing 16 people.
- 27 October–8 November – 2026 World Weightlifting Championships in Ningbo.

=== November ===
- 8 November – Fourteen people are killed while 25 others are injured in a building fire in Taiyuan, Shanxi.
- 10 November – China turns over the remains of US airmen killed on a World War II mission to resupply the Chinese war effort, which were excavated along the Hump.
- 19 November – In Shenzhen, Guangdong, President Xi hosts Russian President Vladimir Putin and U.S. President Donald Trump for a trilateral meeting to discuss international cooperation and security during the 2026 APEC summit.

=== Predicted and scheduled ===
- 5–8 November – 2026 Trampoline Gymnastics World Championships.

== Holidays ==
- 1 January – New Year's Day
- 15–23 February – Chinese New Year
- 5–6 April – Tomb-Sweeping Day
- 1 May – Labour Day
- 19 June – Dragon Boat Festival
- 25 September – Mid-Autumn Festival
- 1 – 7 October – National Day

== Deaths ==
- 3 January –
  - Wang Zheng, 64, vice admiral.
  - Zhang Kerang, 78, Peking opera actor.
- 4 March – Song Ping, 108, head of the CCP organization department (1987–1989), state councillor (1983–1988), and governor of Gansu (1977–1979).
- 7 May – Zhang Anjian, 55, politician, deputy mayor of Chongqing.
- 4 June – Jin Ze, 33, actor.
- 25 June – Wan Shaofen, 95, politician, Party Secretary of Jiangxi (1985–1988).
- 22 July – Wang Quanying, 105, soldier, last living female soldier of the Long March.
- 10 August – Zhu Senlin, 95, sixth Governor of Guangdong.
- 12 August – Zhu Rongji, 97, premier (1998–2003), vice premier (1991–1998) and Party Secretary of Shanghai (1989–1991).
- 24 August – Chen Wu, 71, vice chairman of the NCCPPCC (since 2023) and chairman of Guangxi (2013–2020).
- 8 September – Tung Chee-hwa, 89, Chief Executive of Hong Kong (1997–2005), and vice chairman of the NCCPPCC (2005–2023).
- 18 October – Ng Hong-mun, 100, educator, deputy to the NPC (1975–2008).
- 28 October – Liu Yandong, 80, vice premier (2013–2018), state councillor (2008–2013), and head of the UFWD (2002–2007).

== Art and entertainment ==
- List of Chinese submissions for the Academy Award for Best International Feature Film

== See also ==
- Timeline of Chinese history
- Years in China
