= 2031 AFC Asian Cup bids =

Football tournament host selection process

The bidding process for the 2031 AFC Asian Cup was the process by which the location for the 2031 AFC Asian Cup host will be chosen.

On 20 March 2026, the bidding process for the 2031 and 2035 tournaments was halted. The AFC is considering moving the tournament to even-numbered years, because of a potential revisions to the FIFA International Match Calendar.

== Bidding process ==
On 3 February 2026, the Asian Football Confederation (AFC) brought forward the award of hosts for its 2031 and 2035 Asian Cups, opening up a bid process for the confederation's flagship tournament that began in early 2024 with the hosts expected to be chosen later in 2027.

== Confirmed bids ==
The following bids were confirmed by the AFC:

=== Australia ===
Football Australia have submitted an expression of interest to host the 2031 Asian Cup. Australia previously hosted the 2015 Asian Cup, co-hosted the 2023 FIFA Women's World Cup with New Zealand, and is scheduled to host the 2026 AFC Women's Asian Cup. They are also bidding for the 2035 edition.

=== India ===
The All India Football Federation submitted an expression of interest to host the 2031 Asian Cup. India previously hosted the 2017 FIFA U-17 World Cup and the 2022 FIFA U-17 Women's World Cup. The bid received support from the Government of India.

=== Indonesia ===
On 11 December 2024, the Football Association of Indonesia announced its intention to bid for the 2031 Asian Cup. Indonesia previously co-hosted the 2007 tournament with Malaysia, Thailand and Vietnam, as well as the 2023 FIFA U-17 World Cup. Which is planned to be held at stadiums like Gelora Bung Karno Stadium, Jakarta International Stadium, Gelora Bung Tomo Stadium, Jalak Harupat Stadium, Manahan Stadium, Gelora Sriwijaya Stadium, Pakansari Stadium, and North Sumatra Stadium.

=== Kuwait ===
On 30 December 2024, the Kuwait Football Association announced it had submitted a bid for the 2031 Asian Cup, after hosting the 26th Arabian Gulf Cup. Kuwait previously hosted the 1980 Asian Cup. They are also bidding for the 2035 edition.

=== South Korea ===
On 28 February 2025, the Korea Football Association submitted an expression of interest to host the 2031 Asian Cup. They last hosted the 1960 Asian Cup. They are also bidding for the 2035 edition.

=== Kyrgyzstan, Tajikistan, and Uzbekistan ===
On 24 February 2025, the Central Asian Football Association announced a historic bid to bring the Asian Cup to Central Asia for the first time. Uzbekistan hosted the 2024 FIFA Futsal World Cup and is scheduled to co-host the 2027 FIFA U-20 World Cup with Azerbaijan and host the 2029 AFC Women's Asian Cup. The 2023 CAFA Nations Cup was hosted by Kyrgyzstan and Uzbekistan, and the 2025 edition by Tajikistan and Uzbekistan.

== Withdrawn bids ==
=== United Arab Emirates ===
On 21 February 2025, the United Arab Emirates Football Association submitted a bid to host the 2031 Asian Cup. The United Arab Emirates had previously hosted the Asian Cup in 1996 and 2019. However, on 27 November 2025, the United Arab Emirates Football Association announced that they would withdraw their bid.
