= Yu Zhigang =

Yu Zhigang may refer to:

- Yu Zhigang (academic administrator)
- Yu Zhigang (politician)
