= 2027 in China =

- Decades: 2000s; 2010s; 2020s
- See also: Other events of 2027; History of China • Timeline • Years

Events in the year 2027 in China.

== Events ==
=== Predicted and scheduled ===
- 15–25 January – 2027 Winter World University Games
- 17–25 July – 2027 FIBA Under-19 Women's Basketball World Cup
- 19–27 September – 2027 World Athletics Championships
- The next Chinese Communist Party election will be held.

== Holidays ==
- 1 January – New Year's Day
- 5–11 February – Chinese New Year
- 5 April – Tomb-Sweeping Day
- 1 May – Labour Day
- 9 June – Dragon Boat Festival
- 15 September – Mid-Autumn Festival
- 1–7 October – National Day
- 31 October – Halloween
- 25 December – Christmas Eve
- 31 December – New Year's Eve

== Art and entertainment ==
- List of Chinese submissions for the Academy Award for Best International Feature Film
- 2027 in Chinese music
- List of Chinese films of 2027
- 2027 in Chinese television

== See also ==
- Timeline of Chinese history
- Years in China
