= Stephen Gao =

Chinese seismologist

Stephen Shangxing Gao (Chinese: 高尚行) is a Chinese seismologist.

Gao graduated from Ocean University of China in 1984 with a bachelor's degree in marine geology and geophysics, then pursued master's and doctoral study at the University of California, Los Angeles, specializing in geophysics and space physics. Gao remained at UCLA as a postdoctoral researcher, then moved to the Carnegie Institution for Science as a postdoctoral research associate. Arizona State University subsequently hired Gao as a visiting assistant professor, and in 1999, he joined the Kansas State University faculty. Gao was promoted to associate professor in 2004, and moved to the Missouri University of Science and Technology in 2006. In 2012, Gao was elected a fellow of the Geological Society of America. In December 2018, Gao was appointed to a Curators’ Distinguished Teaching Professorship at S&T. Between 2022 and August 2023, Gao served as interim chair of Missouri S&T's computer science department, when he was named interim chair of geosciences, geological and petroleum engineering. The following year, Gao became the full-time department chair.
