= Wen Shengchang =

Chinese oceanographer and academic (1921–2022)

- 文圣常
- Born: 1 November 1921; Guangshan County, Henan, China
- Died: 20 March 2022 (aged 100); Qingdao, Shandong, China
- Education: Wuhan University
- Scientific career
- Fields: Physical oceanography
- Workplaces: Ocean University of China

Chinese name
- Simplified Chinese: 文圣常
- Traditional Chinese: 文聖常
Transcriptions
Standard Mandarin
- Hanyu Pinyin: Wén Shèngcháng

Wen Shengchang (1 November 1921 – 20 March 2022) was a Chinese oceanographer and academic who was a professor at the Ocean University of China, a former president of Shandong Institute of Oceanology, and an academician of the Chinese Academy of Sciences. He was a member of the Jiusan Society and the Chinese Communist Party.

== Biography ==
Wen was born in the town of Zhuanqiao in Guangshan County, Henan, on 1 November 1921. He finished his elementary education in Huangchuan Middle School and secondary in Yichang High School and Hubei United High School. In 1940, he entered Leshan Central Technical College and soon was admitted to the Department of Machinery, Wuhan University in Leshan, Sichuan.

After graduating in 1944, he had successively served as a probationer in the 8th Aircraft Repair Shop of Chengdu Aviation Commission, a member of the examination unit of the 11th Aircraft Repair Shop, and an operator of the Air Transport 103 Squadron of the Republic of China Air Force. In 1946, he was sent to study at the American Aviation Machinery School at the expense of the government for a year.

In 1952, he became a professor at Harbin Institute of Military Engineering (now National University of Defense Technology). One year later, Professor He Chongben invited him to join the Department of Oceanography, Shandong University in Qingdao. He joined the Jiusan Society in March 1956 and the Chinese Communist Party in February 1983. He was promoted to be president of Shandong Institute of Oceanology (later reshuffled as the Ocean University of China) in 1984, concurrently serving as director of the Institute of Physical Oceanography.

On 20 March 2022, he died in Qingdao, Shandong, at the age of 100.

== Honours and awards ==
- 1985 State Science and Technology Progress Award (Second Class)
- 1993 Member of the Chinese Academy of Sciences (CAS)
- 1997 State Science and Technology Progress Award (Third Class)
- 1999 Science and Technology Progress Award of the Ho Leung Ho Lee Foundation
