= Li Huanying =

Chinese doctor (1921–2022)

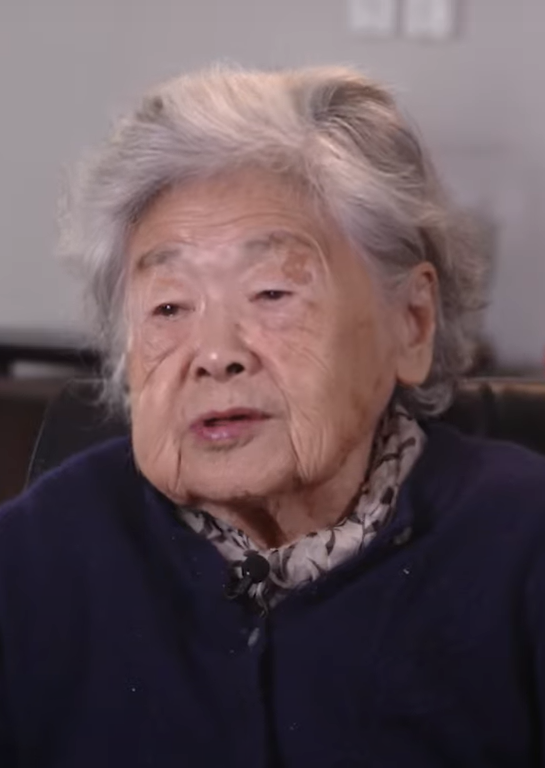
Li Huanying

Li Huanying (Chinese: 李桓英; pinyin: Lǐhuányīng; August 17, 1921 – November 25, 2022) was a Chinese physician at Beijing Friendship Hospital of Capital Medical University. She was also a researcher at the Beijing Institute of Tropical Medicine. She is well known internationally for her expertise in leprosy.

She was awarded the first prize of the National Science and Technology Progress Award and the Lifetime Achievement Award of the First China Leprosy Prevention and Treatment Award. She was honored with the title of "The Most Beautiful Struggler" in 2019 and was selected as one of the "Three 100 Outstanding People" in 2021. On August 20, 2021, the government awarded her the title of "Model of the Times".

== Early life and education ==
Li Huanying was born in Beijing in August 1921. She has a good family background. Her grandfather, Lee Keng Fong, was a first-generation international student who attended the law school of Higashi-Keio University in Japan. In 1945, Huanying graduated from the Medical School of Tongji University in Shanghai, China, and went to Johns Hopkins University in the United States in 1946 for her master's degree in bacteriology and public health. After graduating, she stayed at the university as an assistant researcher in the Department of Microbiology.

== Career ==
In 1950, when the World Health Organization (WHO) was established, Huanying was recommended by the university as one of the first WHO officials. In 1958, WHO offered to renew their contract, but she chose to return to China.

After she returned, she worked at the Institute of Dermatology of the Chinese Academy of Medical Sciences and dedicated herself to researching leprosy.

At that time, leprosy did not have effective medicine and was a dangerous disease to contract. However, Huanying was ordered to a leper village in Taizhou, Jiangsu. There, she observed the suffering of the people. Leprosy was described as a terrible plague, and because of the unknown nature of the disease, those infected were also driven to isolated places to be left to fend for themselves. At one point, they were even brutally treated by burning and burying. Realizing that the WHO was working on a new approach to combining chemotherapy for the treatment of leprosy, Huanying went to many leper villages and ended up with a full report to submit to the WHO in four years. She persuaded the WHO to pilot this program in China through this report.

During this time, people were scared to interact with the lepsia patients. However, the disease is challenging to infect other people. Huanying went to the village to break the fear and interacted with the patients without wearing an isolation suit; she hugged and shook hands with them. Her behavior made the public believe and limited the discrimination and fear toward the patients. She actively went into the leprosy area for more than ten consecutive years to observe and study the patients receiving treatment, and she strongly supported that leprosy patients should be opened up and that regular employment and schooling should be carried out in treatment so that the patients could lead an everyday life like everybody else. She actively publicized that leprosy is a general infectious disease and that leprosy patients should not be disliked or isolated and should be detected early and put on MDT in time.

== Contribution ==
Over the past twenty years, Huanying has introduced internationally advanced technology and invited international experts to give lectures on several occasions in China, training many future researchers in leprosy prevention and treatment. In 1999, 98.6% of the cities had eliminated leprosy, and the short-course combined chemotherapy had achieved complete success, which made outstanding contributions to the cause of leprosy prevention and treatment and achieved world-class results.

Huanying has published 14 treatises and 7 reviews. She was awarded one national scientific and technological achievement, six provincial scientific and technological achievements, and two bureau-level scientific and technological achievements. She was also invited to attend international and WHO leprosy conferences several times a year to discuss leprosy prevention strategies.

== Personal life ==
She remained unmarried.

== Death ==
On November 25, 2022, Li Huanying died at the age of 101 in Beijing.
