= Changsha building collapse =

2022 building collapse in Hunan, China

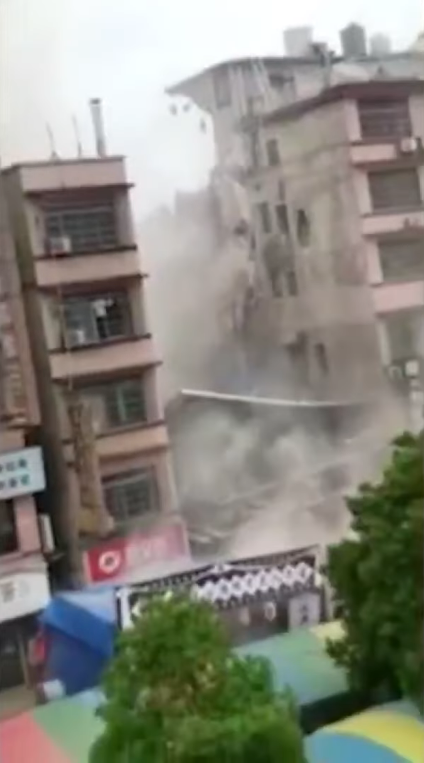
- Screenshot of an amateur video filming the collapse.
- Date: 29 April 2022 (4 years ago)
- Time: 12:24 (CST, UTC+8)
- Location: Wangcheng District, Changsha, Hunan, China; 28.298864°N 112.873552°E
- Cause: Under investigation
- Deaths: 54
- Injuries: 9

The Changsha building collapse occurred on 29 April 2022 in the Wangcheng District, Changsha, Hunan, China. The disaster killed 54 and injured nine.

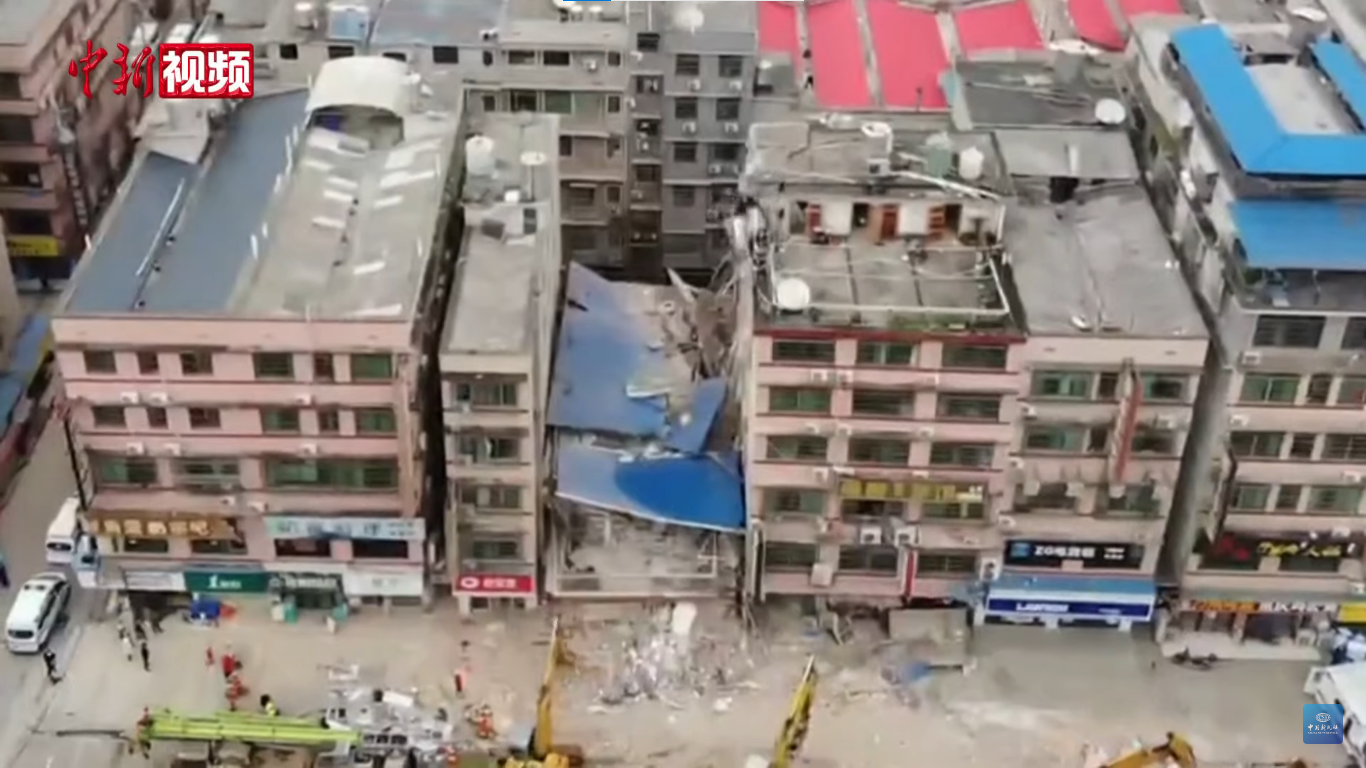
The aftermath of the collapse

== Background ==
The collapsed building was a self-built residential structure originally had five floors in 2012 and was expanded to eight floors in 2018. The first floor served as a storefront, the second floor was a restaurant, the third floor housed a cinema café, the fourth, fifth, and sixth floors operated as a guesthouse, and the seventh and eighth floors were private residences. Tenants had made varying degrees of structural modifications to the building.

== Incident ==
At about 12 pm on 29 April 2022, a building collapsed in Panshuwan, Jinping Community, Wangcheng District. Local firefighters dispatched 23 fire trucks, 134 rescue personnel, and four search and rescue dogs to the scene. A student who escaped told reporters that while eating with two classmates, they heard unusual noises from the walls and something fell from the ceiling. Store staff sensed the danger and urged them to leave quickly. One minute after paying the bill at 12:21 pm and going downstairs, the building collapsed. The three escaped at 12:26 pm.

On 2 May, the police preliminarily confirmed that 23 people were trapped inside the building and 39 were missing.

After more than 72 hours of the critical rescue period, despite a large deployment of rescue forces and equipment, the rescue remained very difficult. The buildings on both sides of the collapsed structure were classified as "dangerous buildings," preventing the use of heavy machinery. Rescuers had to proceed carefully by reinforcing the structures while digging through to reach survivors.

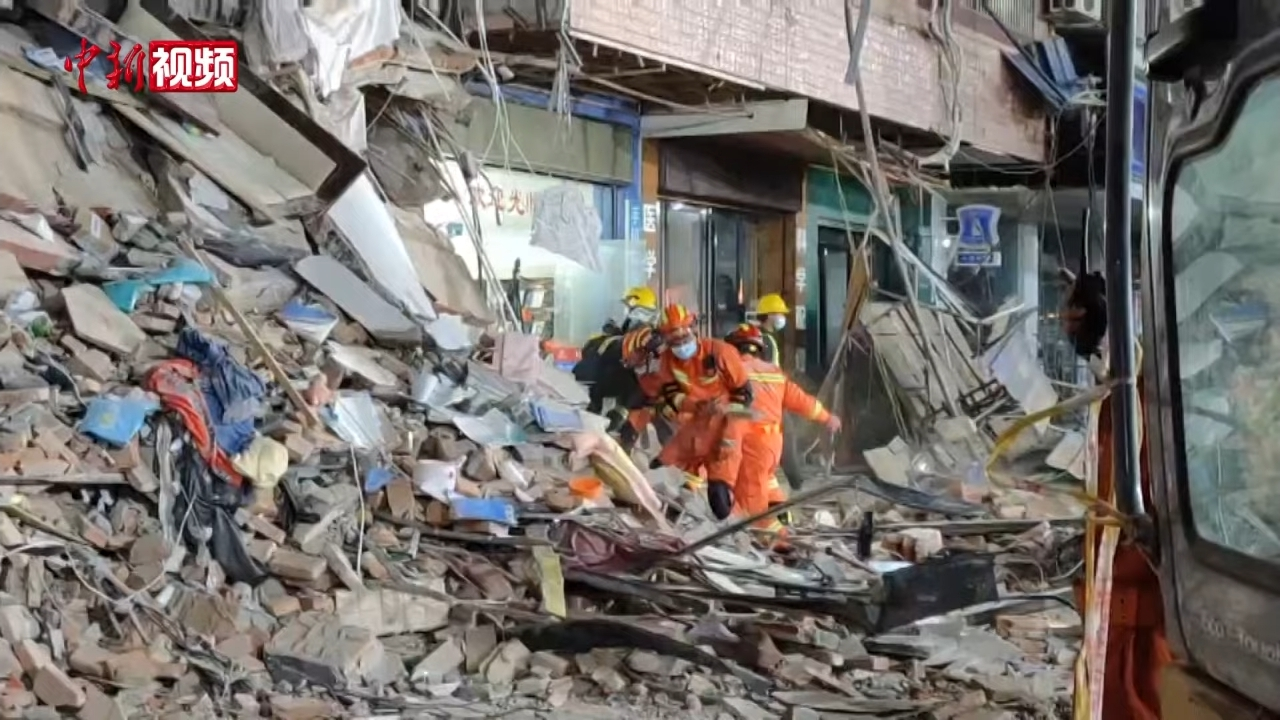
Rescue workers searching for survivors

By 5 May, 10 people had been rescued, while 26 remained missing. Most of the missing were students from Changsha Medical University, located about 100 meters away. Many family members posted missing person notices on social media platforms.

On 6 May, the emergency rescue operations concluded.

== Prosecution ==
Chinese authorities arrested nine people linked to the collapse.
