= Zhang Xingqian =

Chinese physicist (1921–2022)

- 张兴钤
- Born: 16 October 1921; Wuyi County, Zhili, China
- Died: 29 July 2022 (aged 100); Beijing, China
- Education: Wuhan University; Case Western Reserve University; Massachusetts Institute of Technology
- Scientific career
- Fields: Metal physics
- Workplaces: University of Science and Technology Beijing; Ninth Research Institute of the Second Ministry of Machine Building; China Academy of Engineering Physics; Military Industry Bureau of the Ministry of Nuclear Industry

Chinese name
- Simplified Chinese: 张兴钤
- Traditional Chinese: 張興鈐
Transcriptions
Standard Mandarin
- Hanyu Pinyin: Zhāng Xīngqián

Zhang Xingqian (Chinese: 张兴钤; 16 October 1921 – 29 July 2022) was a Chinese metal physicist who was a professor at the China Academy of Engineering Physics, and an academician of the Chinese Academy of Sciences.

== Biography ==
Zhang was born in Wuyi County, Zhili (now Hebei), on 16 October 1921. In 1935, he was accepted to the Mechanical Engineering Department of Higher Vocational School of Hebei Institute of Technology (now Hebei University of Technology) in Tianjin. In the summer of 1936, he dropped out of school and went south to Shanghai, and enrolled at Jiangsu Provincial Shanghai High School. In the autumn of 1937, the Imperial Japanese Army occupied Shanghai. After refusing the solicitation of the Kuomintang spy, he endured malaria and applied for university in Wuhan. He joined the Chinese Communist Party (CCP) in March 1940. After graduating from Wuhan University in 1942, he was assigned to the Qijiang Electrochemical Metallurgical Plant in southwest China's Sichuan. In August 1946, he was transferred to the Anshan Iron and Steel Co., Ltd. in northeast China's Liaoning. In 1947, he pursued advanced studies in the United States, first earning master of metallurgy degree from Case Western Reserve University in 1949 and then doctor of metallurgy degree from Massachusetts Institute of Technology in 1952.

In June 1955, Zhang embarked on the journey for China. He arrived at Luohu Port in Shenzhen by steamer Gordon on 10 July, and before long he became a professor of Beijing Iron and Steel Institute (now University of Science and Technology Beijing). Starting in 1963, he successively served as director of the Test Department, deputy chief engineer, deputy director and chief engineer at the Ninth Research Institute of the Second Ministry of Machine Building. In 1980, he was promoted to chief engineer of the Military Industry Bureau of the Ministry of Nuclear Industry.

On 29 July 2022, he died from an illness in Beijing, at the age of 100.

== Honours and awards ==
- 1982 State Science and Technology Progress Award (First Class)
- 1985 State Science and Technology Progress Award (Special)
- 1991 Member of the Chinese Academy of Sciences (CAS)
- 2002 Science and Technology Progress Award of the Ho Leung Ho Lee Foundation
