= Chen Jingxiong =

Chinese engineer (1921–2022)

- 陈敬熊
- Born: 16 October 1921; Zhenhai County, Zhejiang, China
- Died: 16 March 2022 (aged 100); Beijing, China
- Education: Utopia University; Shanghai Jiao Tong University
- Scientific career
- Fields: Electromagnetism; Microwave technology
- Workplaces: 2nd Research Institute of Aerospace Industry Corporation

Chinese name
- Simplified Chinese: 陈敬熊
- Traditional Chinese: 陳敬熊
Transcriptions
Standard Mandarin
- Hanyu Pinyin: Chén Jìngxióng

Chen Jingxiong (16 October 1921 – 16 March 2022) was a Chinese engineer specializing in electromagnetism and microwave technology, and an academician of the Chinese Academy of Engineering.

== Biography ==
Chen was born in Zhenhai County (now Zhenhai District of Ningbo), Zhejiang, on 16 October 1921. In 1943, he was accepted to Utopia University, graduating in 1947 with a bachelor's degree. He went on to receive his master's degree in 1950 at Shanghai Jiao Tong University.

In January 1950, he served in the Beijing Institute of Posts and Telecommunications for a year before joining the Institute of Telecommunications, Ministry of Communications. He became deputy director of the 5th Research Institute of the Ministry of Defense in January 1957 and deputy director of the No. 23 Institute of the 2nd Academy of the 7th Ministry of Machinery in January 1965. In January 1980, he moved to the 2nd Research Institute of Aerospace Industry Corporation.

On 16 March 2022, Chen Jingxiong died from an illness in Beijing, at the age of 100.

== Honours and awards ==
- 1985 State Technological Invention Award (First Class)
- 1995 Member of the Chinese Academy of Engineering (CAE)
