= Zhang Anjian =

Chinese politician (1971–2026)

Zhang Anjian (Chinese:张安疆; February 1971 – 7 May 2026) was a Chinese politician.

== Life and career ==
In 1994, he graduated from the Department of Construction Engineering of Xi'an Mining College (now Xi'an University of Science and Technology) with a major in construction engineering.

In December 2017, he served as Deputy Secretary of the Jiuquan Municipal Committee of the Chinese Communist Party (CCP), and was elected as the mayor of Jiuquan Municipal People's Government in January of the next year.

In December 2019, Anjiang, as a member of the large-scale cross-provincial departmental bureau-level cadre exchange, was transferred to the deputy secretary of the Chongqing Tongnan District Committee of the CCP and the acting district governor of the Chongqing Tongnan District People's Government. In May 2021, he served as the Secretary of the CCP Tongnan District Committee of Chongqing City.

In January 2023, he was elected as the vice mayor of Chongqing Municipal People's Government. In February 2024, he succeeded Hu Minglang as CCP committee secretary, director and chief inspector of Chongqing Public Security Bureau, and Deputy Secretary of the Chongqing Municipal Political and Legal Affairs Committee of the CCP.

Zhang died on 7 May 2026, at the age of 55.
