= Zhang Ziyi (zootechnician) =

Chinese animal nutritionist (1925–2022)

- 张子仪
- Born: 4 March 1925; Linyi County, Shanxi, China
- Died: 23 March 2022 (aged 97); Beijing, China
- Education: Hokkaido University; Kyoto University
- Scientific career
- Fields: Zootechnics
- Workplaces: Institute of Animal Husbandry, Chinese Academy of Agricultural Sciences

Chinese name
- Simplified Chinese: 张子仪
- Traditional Chinese: 張子儀
Transcriptions
Standard Mandarin
- Hanyu Pinyin: Zhāng Zǐyí

Zhang Ziyi (4 March 1925 – 23 March 2022) was a Chinese zootechnician and an academician of the Chinese Academy of Engineering. He was a member of the 7th and 8th National Committee of the Chinese People's Political Consultative Conference.

== Biography ==
Zhang was born in Linyi County, Shanxi, on 4 March 1925. His father was a Jinshi during the late Qing Dynasty (1644–1911) in Imperial China. After graduating from Hokkaido University in the Empire of Japan in 1945, he attended Kyoto University where he obtained his bachelor's degree in agronomy in Allied-occupied Japan in 1948 and doctor's degree in animal nutrition in 1952.

Zhang returned to China in October 1952 and that same year became a group leader in the North China Institute of Agricultural Sciences. In January 1980, he took office as director of the Institute of Animal Husbandry, Chinese Academy of Agricultural Sciences, a position he held until January 2010.

On 23 March 2022, he died of an illness in Beijing, at the age of 97.

== Honours and awards ==
- 1985 State Science and Technology Progress Award (Second Class) for the paper of Tables of Feed Composition and Nutritive Value in China
- 1996 State Science and Technology Progress Award (Second Class) for the Study on Nutritional Parameters and New Technology of Feed Formula for Pigs and Chickens
- 1997 Member of the Chinese Academy of Engineering (CAE)
