= Guo Pingtan =

Chinese politician (1933–2022)

Member of the National People's Congress
- In office June 1983 – March 1988

Personal details
- Born: 1 January 1933 Tainan, Japanese Taiwan
- Died: 5 February 2022 (aged 89)

Guo Pingtan (Chinese: 郭平坦; 1 January 1933 – 5 February 2022) was a Chinese politician.

He served in the 6th National People's Congress, which lasted from June 1983 to March 1988. He died on 5 February 2022, at the age of 89.
