= 2035 AFC Asian Cup bids =

Football tournament host selection process

The 2035 AFC Asian Cup bids refer to the selection processes organised by the Asian Football Confederation (AFC) to determine the host nation(s) for the 2031 and 2035 editions of the AFC Asian Cup.

These editions mark the beginning of a new era for the competition, as they will be the first Asian Cups awarded under a multi-cycle hosting strategy in which two future tournaments are selected simultaneously.

The bidding processes are overseen by the AFC, Asia’s governing body of association football. In April 2025, AFC President Sheikh Salman bin Ebrahim Al Khalifa proposed that the hosts for both tournaments be chosen at the same AFC Congress to provide longer lead times for planning, infrastructure development, and commercial preparations.

On 20 March 2026, the bidding process for the 2031 and 2035 tournaments was halted. The AFC is considering moving the tournament to even-numbered years, because of a potential revisions to the FIFA International Match Calendar.

== Background ==
The AFC Asian Cup is the premier men’s national team competition in Asia. Traditionally, hosts have been selected for each tournament individually. However, growing commercial interest, broadcast expansion, and the increasing scale of infrastructure requirements led the AFC to explore a multi-cycle host selection model.

Under this model, the AFC aims to:

- improve long-term tournament planning
- provide greater certainty for host governments
- strengthen commercial partnerships
- reduce administrative duplication

The 2031 and 2035 tournaments will be the first to follow this new approach.

== Bidding process ==
The Asian Football Confederation (AFC) formally opened the bidding process following the conclusion of the 2027 AFC Asian Cup cycle. Member Associations were invited to submit expressions of interest and detailed bid documentation in accordance with the AFC’s bidding regulations on 11 April 2025. The bidding timeline is as follows:

- 27 November 2024: Member Associations formally invited to submit their expressions of interest
- 28 February 2025: Deadline for Member Associations to confirm their expressions of interest
- 27 August 2025: Bid requirements made available to bidders
- Q1 2026: Bid workshop to take place
- 30 June 2026: Deadline for Member Associations to submit their final bid
- July - December 2026: Inspection visits
- 2027: Appointment of 2031 and 2035 AFC Asian Cup host(s)

Both hosts are expected to be announced at the same Congress in 2027 in Saudi Arabia.

== Confirmed bids ==
On 4 February 2026, AFC confirmed that it had received four official bids to host the 2035 tournament: Australia, Japan, Kuwait and South Korea.

=== Australia ===
Football Australia submitted an expression of interest to host the 2031 AFC Asian Cup. Australia previously hosted the tournament in 2015 Asian Cup, co-hosted the 2023 FIFA Women's World Cup with New Zealand, and hosted the 2026 AFC Women's Asian Cup. The country is bidding for the 2031 and 2035 editions.

=== Japan ===
On 4 February 2026, the Japan Football Association submitted an expression of interest to host the 2035 Asian Cup. They last hosted the 1992 Asian Cup.

=== Kuwait ===
On 30 December 2024, the Kuwait Football Association announced it had submitted a bid for the 2031 and 2035 Asian Cup, after hosting the 26th Arabian Gulf Cup. Kuwait previously hosted the 1980 Asian Cup.

=== South Korea ===
On 28 February 2025, the Korea Football Association submitted an expression of interest to host the 2031 and 2035 Asian Cup. They last hosted the 1960 Asian Cup.
