= Teng Jinxian =

Chinese film director (1937–2022)

- 滕进贤
- Born: 24 May 1937; Jizhou District, Tianjin, China
- Died: 7 March 2022 (aged 84); Beijing, China
- Occupations: film director, producer, screenwriter and stage actor

Teng Jinxian (Chinese: 滕进贤; 24 May 1937 – 7 March 2022) was a Chinese film director, producer, screenwriter and stage actor.

== Life and career ==
Teng was born on 24 May 1937 in Jizhou District, Tianjin. He graduated from the Chongqing Tsinghua Middle School in 1959 and the Performance Department of Sichuan Drama School in 1961. After, he became an actor at the Sichuan Provincial People's Art Theater.

At some point he became the film director of Emei Film Studio and co-directed "Sacred Mission" and "Girl's Wish". In 1980s, he independently directed the film "A Capable Wife" and the opera "Pirate's Daughter", also he wrote the screenplays "Last Emperor" and "Tagliarisai".

In 1987, he was appointed a director of the Film Bureau of the Ministry of Radio, Film and Television. From 1987 to 1993, Teng served as the deputy director of the Jury of the Film Government Awards.

Teng died on 7 March 2022, at the age of 84.

== Filmography ==
=== Director ===
- Sacred Mission (神聖的使命) (1979) (together with Mao Yuqin)
- Girl's Wish (姑娘的心愿) (1981) (together with Mao Yuqin)
- A Capable Wife (内当家) (1982)
- Pirate's Daughter (海盗的女儿) (1983)

=== Producer ===
- Cross the River (過江) (1988)
- Chongqing Negotiation (重慶談判) (1994)
