= Xu Xingchu =

Chinese engineer (1934–2022)

- 徐性初
- Born: 7 January 1934; Nanchang, Jiangxi, China
- Died: 1 January 2022 (aged 87); Beijing, China
- Education: Dalian University of Technology
- Scientific career
- Fields: Precision machine tool
- Workplaces: Beijing Machine Tool Research Institute

Xu Xingchu (Chinese: 徐性初; pinyin: Xú Xìngchū; 7 January 1934 – 1 January 2022) was a Chinese engineer and an academician of the Chinese Academy of Sciences. He was a member of the 7th, 8th and 9th National Committees of the Chinese People's Political Consultative Conference.

== Biography ==
Xu was born in Tianjin, on 7 January 1934. He secondary studied at Nanchang No. 1 High School. In 1951, he was accepted to Dalian University of Technology, majoring in machine tools. After university, he was despatched to the Design Office of the Second Bureau of the Ministry of Machinery Industry (now Beijing Machine Tool Research Institute) as an engineer. He died in Beijing on 1 January 2022, at the age of 87.

== Honours and awards ==
- 1993 Member of the Chinese Academy of Sciences
