= Mao Yongze =

Chinese physicist (1930–2022)

- 毛用泽
- Born: 1 September 1930; Ningbo, Zhejiang, China
- Died: 6 March 2022 (aged 91); Beijing, China
- Education: Tsinghua University
- Scientific career
- Fields: Nuclear technology
- Workplaces: PLA Chemical Defense Research Institute

Chinese name
- Simplified Chinese: 毛用泽
- Traditional Chinese: 毛用澤
Transcriptions
Standard Mandarin
- Hanyu Pinyin: Máo Yòngzé

Mao Yongze (1 September 1930 – 6 March 2022) was a Chinese nuclear technology engineer, and an academician of the Chinese Academy of Engineering.

== Biography ==
Mao was born in Ningbo, Zhejiang, on 1 September 1930. He secondary studied at Ningbo Xiaoshi High School. In 1949, he was accepted by Shanghai Jiaotong University. After the outbreak of the Korean War, he signed up for the PLA Chemical Defense Corps Cadre School and was sent to study at the Department of Chemical Engineering, Peking University. In 1952, due to the adjustment of departments of colleges and universities, he was transferred to the Department of Chemical Engineering, Tsinghua University. After graduating in 1953, he was assigned to the Institute of Modern Physics, Chinese Academy of Sciences.

Beginning in January 1955, he served in several posts in PLA Chemical Defense Research Institute, including professional team leader, deputy director, and director.

Mao died from an illness in Beijing, on 6 March 2022, at the age of 91.

== Honours and awards ==
- May 1995 Member of the Chinese Academy of Engineering (CAE)
