= Zhou Xiaofeng =

Chinese entrepreneur and politician (1964–2022)

Member of the National People's Congress
- In office 5 March 2008 – 14 March 2012

Personal details
- Born: March 1964 Gucheng County, Hebei, China
- Died: 2 January 2022 (aged 57)
- Party: CCP

Zhou Xiaofeng (Chinese: 周晓峰; March 1964 – 2 January 2022) was a Chinese entrepreneur and politician. He served as General Secretary of Gu Beichun from January 1996 until his death. He also sat on the 11th National People's Congress. Zhou died on 2 January 2022, at the age of 57.
