= Huiteng Shoes factory fire =

2026 industrial accident in China

- Date: 9 July 2026
- Time: c. 12:04 pm (China Standard Time)
- Venue: Huiteng Shoes facility
- Location: Jinjiang, Quanzhou, China; 24.8167°N 118.6075°E
- Type: Industrial accident
- Cause: Fire
- Outcome: Bank assets frozen
- Deaths: 28
- Arrests: The factory owners and other unnamed individuals

At 12:04 pm (CST) on 9 July 2026, a fire erupted on the first floor in a flammable material storage area at the Huiteng Shoe Company factory in Jinjiang, Fujian, China. Founded in 2015, Huiteng produces shoes for international companies Fila, Beppi, Slazenger and Hi-Tec.

Just after noon, a fire quickly spread on the ground floor of the five-storey concrete building. The fire spread quickly due to highly flammable adhesives and raw materials for shoes. Twenty-eight deaths have been confirmed. The facility had 237 employees and two delivery personnel onsite at the time of the fire and many of them stranded on the roof while rescuers attempted to access them. According to the city fire chief, exits and stairwells were blocked with shoe materials slowing rescue personnel from reaching the upper levels of the building.

General Secretary of the Chinese Communist Party Xi Jinping and Premier Li Qiang stated "[t]he cause of the accident should be identified as soon as possible and... those responsible must be strictly held accountable." Following the incident, several employees of the factory owners were arrested, while the firm's bank account was frozen.
