= Wang Zheng (vice admiral) =

Chinese vice admiral (1961–2026)

- 王征

Director of the People's Liberation Army Navy Political Work Department
- In office June 2018 – January 2026

Personal details
- Born: January 1961 Jing County, Hebei, China
- Died: 3 January 2026 (aged 64)
- Party: Chinese Communist Party

Military service
- Allegiance: People's Republic of China
- Branch/service: People's Liberation Army Air Force; People's Liberation Army Navy
- Rank: Vice admiral

Wang Zheng (Chinese: 王征; pinyin: Wáng Zhēng; January 1961 – 3 January 2026) was a vice admiral (zhongjiang) of the People's Liberation Army (PLA) who was the director of the People's Liberation Army Navy Political Work Department from June 2018.

== Biography ==
Wang was born in Jing County, Hebei, in January 1961. He served in various posts in People's Liberation Army Air Force before serving as director of Jinan Military Region Air Force Political Department in November 2014. In June 2018, he was commissioned as director of the People's Liberation Army Navy Political Work Department.

He was promoted to the rank of vice admiral (zhongjiang) in June 2019.

Wang died on 3 January 2026, at the age of 64.
