= Qian Chunqi =

Chinese doctor and translator

- 钱春绮
- Born: December 7, 1921; Taizhou, Jiangsu, China
- Died: February 3, 2010 (aged 88); Xuhui Central Hospital, Shanghai, China
- Education: Anhui Medical University
- Occupations: Translator, doctor
- Writing career
- Language: Chinese, German
- Period: 1960–2010
- Genre: Poem
- Notable work: Goethe's Faust
- Notable awards: Lu Xun Literary Prize (1996)

Qian Chunqi (simplified Chinese: 钱春绮; traditional Chinese: 錢春綺; pinyin: Qián Chūnqǐ; 7 December 1921 – 3 February 2010) was a Chinese doctor and translator who won the Lu Xun Literary Prize (1996), a prestigious literary award in China.

He was most notable for being one of the main translators into Chinese of the works of the German writer Friedrich Nietzsche.

== Biography ==
Qian was born in a wealthy family in Taizhou, Jiangsu on 7 December 1921, his father was a businessman.

Qian primarily studied at the Wanzhu School (Chinese: 万竹小学), then he attended Jiangsu Provincial Shanghai School (Chinese: 江苏省立上海中学). One year later, Shanghai was occupied by Japan, the school closed, Qian attended Jiangsu Provincial Yangzhou School (Chinese: 江苏省立扬州中学).

Qian entered Anhui Medical University in 1940, majoring in Western medicine, where he graduated in 1946. After graduating he worked in Changzheng Hospital (Chinese: 长征医院), at the same time, he learned German, Japanese, English, French and Russian by himself.

In 1966, the Cultural Revolution was launched by Mao Zedong, the Red Guards confiscated his translations, he suffered political persecution.

Qian returned to work after the reform and opening up.

In 1995, Qian was employed as a translator in Shanghai Research Institute of Culture and History (Chinese: 上海文史馆).

On 3 February 2010, Qian died of illness at Xuhui District Central Hospital (Chinese: 徐汇区中心医院), in Shanghai, aged 89.

== Works ==
- Thus Spoke Zarathustra (Chinese: 査拉图斯特拉如是说)
- Poetry of Nietzsche (Friedrich Nietzsche) (Chinese: 尼采诗歌选)
- Essays of Nietzsche (Friedrich Nietzsche) (Chinese: 尼采散文选)
- Goethe's Faust (Johann Wolfgang von Goethe) (Chinese: 浮士德)
- Poetry of Goethe (Johann Wolfgang von Goethe) (Chinese: 歌德诗歌选)
- Poetry of Heine (Heinrich Heine) (Chinese: 海涅诗歌选)

== Awards ==
- Lu Xun Literary Prize (1996)
- Chinese Translation Association – Senior Translator (2001)
