= Yu Zhigang (academic administrator) =

Yu Zhiagang

Academic background
- Education: Tsinghua University (BS); Nanjing Tech University (MS); Ocean University of China (PhD)

Academic work
- Discipline: Chemistry
- Sub-discipline: Marine chemistry
- Institutions: Ocean University of China

President of the Ocean University of China
- Incumbent
- Assumed office July 14, 2014
- Preceded by: Wu Dexing

Yu Zhigang is a Chinese academic administrator serving as the president of the Ocean University of China. Zhigang assumed office on July 14, 2014 upon the retirement of Wu Dexing.

== Education ==
Zhigang earned a Bachelor of Science degree in applied chemistry from Tsinghua University in 1985, a Master of Science in applied chemistry from Nanjing Tech University in 1988, and a PhD in marine chemistry from the Ocean University of China in 1999.

== Career ==
Zhigang has spent his career at the Ocean University of China, working as an assistant professor, associate professor, research fellow, and tenured professor in the College of Chemistry & Chemical Engineering. He became president of Ocean University on July 14, 2014, succeeding Wu Dexing. In his role, Zhigang concurrently serves as the party chief of the university's Chinese Communist Party branch.

As president, Zhigang traveled and visited the Taras Shevchenko National University of Kyiv and Igor Sikorsky Kyiv Polytechnic Institute to establish partnerships with Ukrainian academic institutions.
