= Zhang Kerang =

Chinese Peking Opera actor (1947–2026)

Zhang Kerang (Chinese: 張克讓; 1947 – 3 January 2026) was a Chinese Peking Opera actor.

== Life and career ==
In 1960, he was admitted to the student class of the Beijing Peking Opera Troupe (now the Beijing Peking Opera House), and was accepted as an apprentice by Ma Lianliang.

Zhang portrayed Zhao Kuangyin in "Three Dozen Tao Three Springs" written by Wu Zuguang, which was made into a color Peking Opera movie.

Zhang died on 3 January 2026, at the age of 78.
