= 2031 =

2031 in various calendars
- Gregorian calendar: 2031; MMXXXI
- Ab urbe condita: 2784
- Armenian calendar: 1480; ԹՎ ՌՆՁ
- Assyrian calendar: 6781
- Baháʼí calendar: 187–188
- Balinese saka calendar: 1952–1953
- Bengali calendar: 1437–1438
- Berber calendar: 2981
- British Regnal year: N/A
- Buddhist calendar: 2575
- Burmese calendar: 1393
- Byzantine calendar: 7539–7540
- Chinese calendar: 庚戌年 (Metal Dog); 4728 or 4521 — to — 辛亥年 (Metal Pig); 4729 or 4522
- Coptic calendar: 1747–1748
- Discordian calendar: 3197
- Ethiopian calendar: 2023–2024
- Hebrew calendar: 5791–5792
- Hindu calendars
- Vikram Samvat: 2087–2088
- Shaka Samvat: 1952–1953
- Kali Yuga: 5131–5132
- Holocene calendar: 12031
- Igbo calendar: 1031–1032
- Iranian calendar: 1409–1410
- Islamic calendar: 1452–1453
- Japanese calendar: Reiwa 13 (令和１３年)
- Javanese calendar: 1964–1965
- Juche calendar: 120
- Julian calendar: Gregorian minus 13 days
- Korean calendar: 4364
- Minguo calendar: ROC 120 民國120年
- Nanakshahi calendar: 563
- Thai solar calendar: 2574
- Tibetan calendar: ལྕགས་ཕོ་ཁྱི་ལོ་ (male Iron-Dog); 2157 or 1776 or 1004 — to — ལྕགས་མོ་ཕག་ལོ་ (female Iron-Boar); 2158 or 1777 or 1005
- Unix time: 1924992000 – 1956527999

2031 (MMXXXI) will be a common year starting on Wednesday of the Gregorian calendar, the 2031st year of the Common Era (CE) and Anno Domini (AD) designations, the 31st year of the 3rd millennium and the 21st century, and the 2nd year of the 2030s decade.

== Predicted and scheduled events ==
- January 1 – Assuming no further extensions to the term of copyrights become law in the interim, books, films and other works by authors who died in 1960 will enter the public domain in the United Kingdom, the European Union and some other jurisdictions; those published in 1935 will enter the public domain in the United States.
- January – NASA plans to deorbit the International Space Station, directing any unbroken remnants into Point Nemo in the South Pacific Ocean.
- January – The 2031 World Men's Handball Championship will be held in Denmark, Iceland and Norway.
- March 31 – The 2030 World Expo will be closed in Riyadh, Saudi Arabia.
- April 5 – Comet Bernardinelli–Bernstein will make its closest approach to Earth at a distance of 10.1 AU (1.5 billion km; 940 million mi).
- May 1 – 100th anniversary of the Empire State Building.
- June – VERITAS, a mission by NASA to map the surface of Venus, will be launched.
- July – The Jupiter Icy Moons Explorer (Juice) will reach Jupiter.
- August 29–September 14 – The 2031 FIBA Basketball World Cup will be held in France.
- September–October – The 2031 Rugby World Cup will be held in the United States.
- October–November – The 2031 Cricket World Cup will be held in India.
- December 12 – Virgin of Guadalupe 500 year anniversary
- December – EnVision, an ESA orbital mission to Venus, will be launched.

=== Date unknown ===
- 2 World Trade Center (aka 200 Greenwich Street) gets finished.
- The XXII Pan American Games will be held.
- The 2031 Women's World Cup will be held in the United States, Mexico, and other CONCACAF members.
- The 2031 AFC Asian Cup will be held.
- In Kazakhstan, the switch of the writing script of the Kazakh language from the Cyrillic alphabet to the Latin alphabet is scheduled to be fully implemented by 2031.
- General elections are scheduled to be held in Nigeria.
