= 2032 AFC Asian Cup =

20th edition of the AFC Asian Cup

Tournament details
- Host country: TBD
- Teams: 24 (from 1 confederation)

The 2032 AFC Asian Cup will be the 20th edition of the AFC Asian Cup, the quadrennial international men's football championship of Asia organised by the Asian Football Confederation (AFC). It will mark the 75th anniversary of the tournament, which started in 1956. It will also be the first tournament to be held on a leap year since the 2004 edition.

The tournament was originally scheduled for 2031. On 20 March 2026, the bidding process for the 2031 and 2035 tournaments was halted. The AFC is considering moving the tournament to even-numbered years, because of a potential revisions to the FIFA International Match Calendar. In September 2026, AFC published the bidding regulations for AFC Asian Cup 2032.

== Host selection ==
=== Original bidding process ===
The AFC confirmed the bidding process for the 2031 and 2035 competitions on 11 April 2025. The bidding timeline is as follows:

- 27 November 2024: Member Associations formally invited to submit their expressions of interest
- 28 February 2025: Deadline for Member Associations to confirm their expressions of interest
- 27 August 2025: Bid requirements made available to bidders
- Q1 2026: Bid workshop to take place
- 30 June 2026: Deadline for Member Associations to submit their final bid
- July – December 2026: Inspection visits
- 2027: Appointment of 2031 and 2035 AFC Asian Cup host(s)

=== Confirmed expressions of interest ===
The following bids were confirmed by the AFC on 4 February 2026:

- Australia

Australia previously hosted the 2015 Asian Cup, co-hosted the 2023 FIFA Women's World Cup with New Zealand, and hosted the 2026 AFC Women's Asian Cup. Football Australia are also bidding for the 2035 edition.

- India

India previously hosted the 2017 FIFA U-17 World Cup, 1980 AFC Women's Championship, 2022 AFC Women's Asian Cup and the 2022 FIFA U-17 Women's World Cup. The bid received support from the Government of India.

- Indonesia

On 11 December 2024, the Football Association of Indonesia announced its intention to bid. Indonesia previously co-hosted the 2007 tournament with Malaysia, Thailand and Vietnam, as well as the 2023 FIFA U-17 World Cup and 2026 FIFA ASEAN Cup.

- Kuwait

On 30 December 2024, the Kuwait Football Association announced it had submitted a bid, after hosting the 26th Arabian Gulf Cup. Kuwait previously hosted the 1980 Asian Cup. They are also bidding for the 2035 edition.

- South Korea

South Korea last hosted the 1960 Asian Cup. The Korea Football Association are also bidding for the 2035 edition.

- Kyrgyzstan, Tajikistan and Uzbekistan

On 24 February 2025, the Central Asian Football Association announced a historic bid to bring the Asian Cup to Central Asia for the first time. Uzbekistan hosted the 2024 FIFA Futsal World Cup and is scheduled to co-host the 2027 FIFA U-20 World Cup with Azerbaijan and host the 2029 AFC Women's Asian Cup. The 2023 CAFA Nations Cup was hosted by Kyrgyzstan and Uzbekistan, and the 2025 edition by Tajikistan and Uzbekistan.

=== Withdrawn bids ===
- United Arab Emirates

Despite submitting a bid 21 February 2025, the UAE Football Association subsequently withdrew their bid on 27 November 2025. The United Arab Emirates had previously hosted the Asian Cup in 1996 and 2019.
