= Wang Quanying =

Chinese Red Army soldier (1921–2026)

- 王全英
- Born: Wang Guixiang; 23 June 1921; Jinchuan County, Sichuan, China
- Died: 22 July 2026 (aged 105); Dujiangyan, Sichuan, China
- Military career
- Branch: Chinese Red Army
- Service years: 1935–1936
- Conflicts: Chinese Civil War; Long March

Wang Quanying (Chinese: 王全英; pinyin: Wáng Quányīng; 23 June 1921 – 22 July 2026) was a Chinese Red Army soldier. She was regarded by the Chinese Communist Party as the last surviving female Red Army soldier who had participated in the Long March.

== Early life ==
Wang Quanying was born Wang Guixiang (王桂香) in Jinchuan County, Sichuan (now in Ngawa Tibetan and Qiang Autonomous Prefecture), into a poor Tibetan family. Her parents died when she was very young, leaving her orphaned. After being raised by an uncle until the age of five, she was sent to work as a servant in the household of a local chieftain, where she tended cattle and horses under the traditional tusi system.

== Long March ==
In the spring of 1935, at the age of fourteen, Wang joined the Fourth Front Army of the Chinese Red Army in Jinchuan together with several other local women. She was assigned to the Women's Independent Regiment and served primarily as a battlefield medical orderly during the Long March. Her duties included guiding troops through local terrain, transporting food supplies, cooking, carrying water, nursing wounded soldiers and participating in qing wozi ("clearing nests"), operations intended to locate and confiscate supplies hidden by wealthy landowners. Familiar with local medicinal herbs, she also treated wounded soldiers using traditional methods to stop bleeding and prevent infection. In the spring of 1936, Wang's unit was encircled by forces of the National Revolutionary Army's 24th Army near Danba. After the suspension bridge across the river was destroyed, Red Army troops were forced to cross on a narrow log bridge. Unable to keep pace because of illness and injuries, Wang became separated from the main force during the fighting. Together with several companions, she crossed snow-covered mountains while surviving on wild plants. Severe frostbite caused the loss of one toe on her left foot. Unable to rejoin the Red Army or safely return home, she eventually arrived in Sanjiang Township in Wenchuan County, in May 1936.

== Later life and death ==
After settling in Sanjiang, Wang married a local villager, Liu Fuguang, and lived under an assumed identity for decades. Following the establishment of the People's Republic of China in 1949, she changed her name from Guixiang to Quanying, explaining that the name expressed her belief that "all Red Army soldiers were heroes." The couple had five children, although only two daughters survived to adulthood because of poor medical conditions at the time. For many years, few people in her village knew of her wartime service. In 1984, during an investigation conducted by the Ngawa Prefecture government to identify stranded former Red Army personnel, officials confirmed her identity and issued her a "Certificate of Stranded Red Army Veteran".

In 2006, Wang relocated from Wenchuan County to Dujiangyan, Sichuan, where she spent her later years at the Longtanwan Wenchuan Retirement Centre.

On 23 June 2026, Wang celebrated her 105th birthday. She described the secret to her longevity as maintaining a positive outlook, eating a largely vegetarian diet, showing compassion toward others and performing good deeds.

Wang died at a hospital in Dujiangyan, on 22 July 2026, at the age of 105.

== Honours ==
- 1984 – Certificate of Stranded Red Army Veteran by the People's Government of Ngawa Prefecture
- 2016 – Commemorative Medal for the 80th Anniversary of the Victory of the Long March by the Central Military Commission
- 2019 – Commemorative Medal for the 70th Anniversary of the Founding of the People's Republic of China jointly by the Central Committee of the Chinese Communist Party, the State Council and the Central Military Commission
