= Ocean University of China =

Public university in Qingdao, Shandong, China

- 中国海洋大学
- Other names: Haida (海大)
- Motto: 海纳百川，取则行远
- Motto in English: Ocean Embraces Streams All and Exploring Promises Reaching Far
- Type: Public
- Established: 1924; 102 years ago
- President: Zhang Junfeng (张俊峰)
- Academic staff: 3,405
- Administrative staff: 2,800
- Students: ~25,000
- Location: Qingdao, Shandong, China; 36°03′54″N 120°19′57″E
- Website: ouc.edu.cn

Chinese name
- Simplified Chinese: 中国海洋大学
- Traditional Chinese: 中國海洋大學
Transcriptions
Standard Mandarin
- Hanyu Pinyin: Zhōngguó Hǎiyáng Dàxué

The Ocean University of China (中国海洋大学) is a public university in Qingdao, Shandong, China. It is affiliated with the Ministry of Education of China. The university is part of Project 211, Project 985, and the Double First-Class Construction.

While offering studies in various branches of natural and social sciences alongside engineering, the university is especially renowned for its marine sciences and fishery sciences departments.

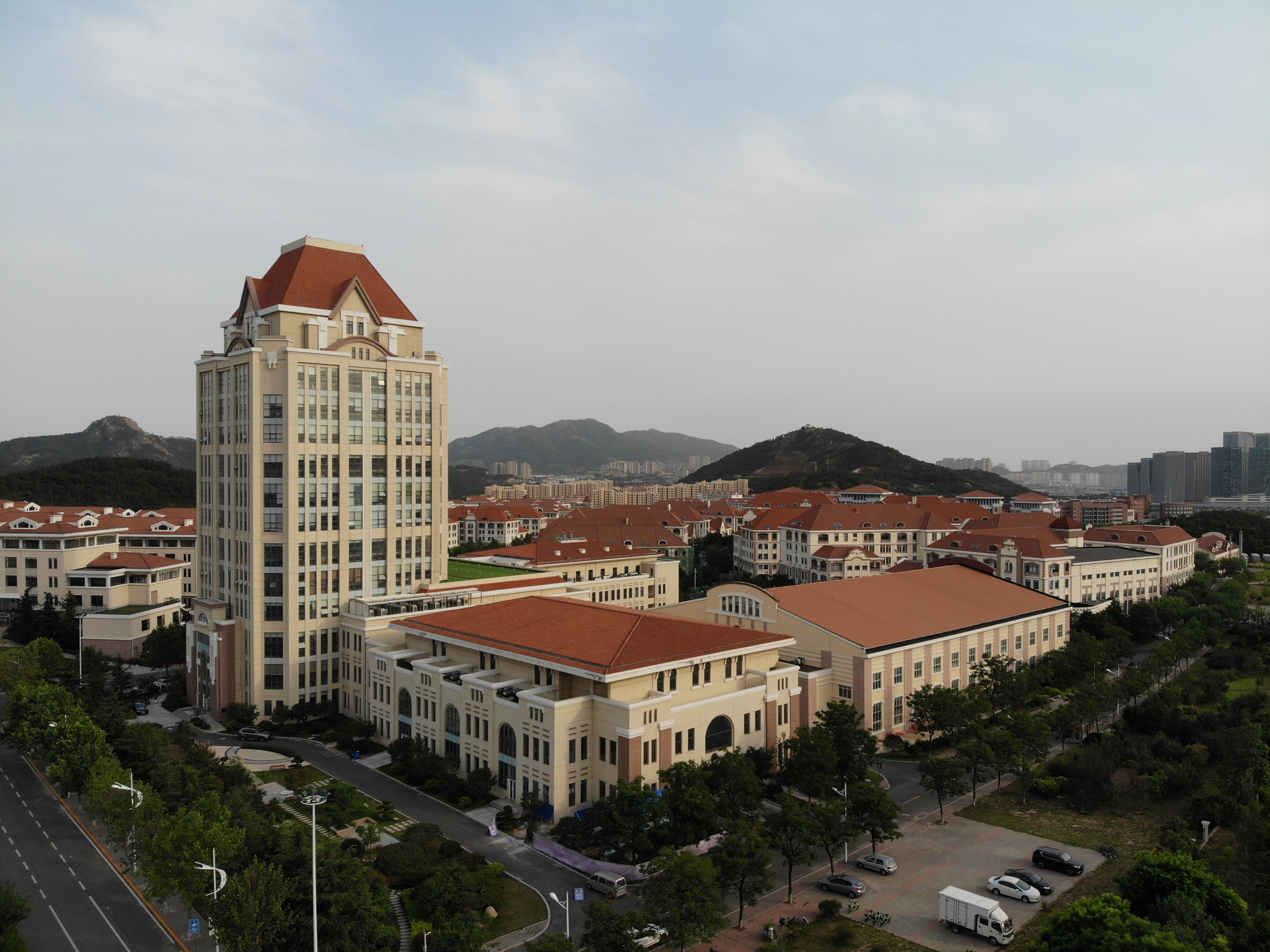
Ocean Science and Technology Center Building and Teaching Building of Ocean University of China

The university celebrated its centenary on October 25, 2024 organising a mega event.

== History ==
Shortly after China recovered sovereignty over Shandong, the university was set up in 1924 as the Private Qingdao University (私立青岛大学). This new higher education institute was located at the site of the former German Bismarck Barracks and was mostly financed by wealthy donors. Success was only short-lived though, as the Republic of China was ravaged by internal strife that had a disrupting effect on the university too. Under the warlord Zhang Zongchang, it became a part of Shandong University. Zhang was defeated shortly thereafter in August 1928, and operations of Shandong University were shut down for a time. In 1930 it was reopened as Qingdao division of Shandong University (国立山东大学(青岛)), and included two colleges, one for literature and one for science. The following years, programs were expanded, and in 1936 the number of students had reached 411. With the Japanese threat of occupation lurking, the university staff and students moved to Sichuan in 1937, where they transferred to other schools.

After the end of the Second World War, the university continued to function as the Qingdao branch of Shandong University. The number of colleges grew to five, and by 1951 the number of students had reached 2,366. Later in the decade, a number of courses in medical sciences and hospitals were removed from the university and set up in the Qingdao Medical School (that would later form a constituent of Qingdao University).

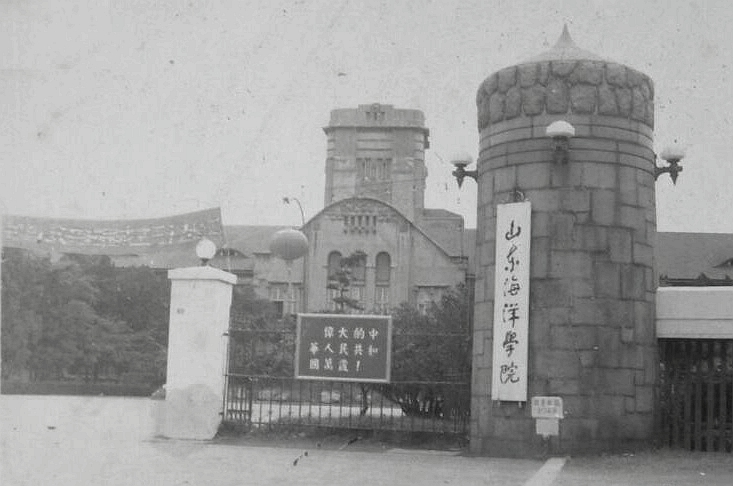
Shandong Ocean University (predecessor of Ocean University of China)

The biggest reshuffling of academic subjects started in 1959, when the maritime science departments of different universities, including Fudan University and Xiamen University were moved to Qingdao. The university was removed from the supervision of Shandong University and placed directly under the Ministry of Education to form the Shandong College of Oceanography (山东海洋学院). It was one of the National Key Universities that were named in October 1960 and as enjoyed a high level of support and funding. In January 1988 it was renamed the Ocean University of Qingdao (青岛海洋大学). Deng Xiaoping wrote the name of the university in his own calligraphic style to mark the occasion. In October 2002, it was renamed the Ocean University of China.

== Location ==
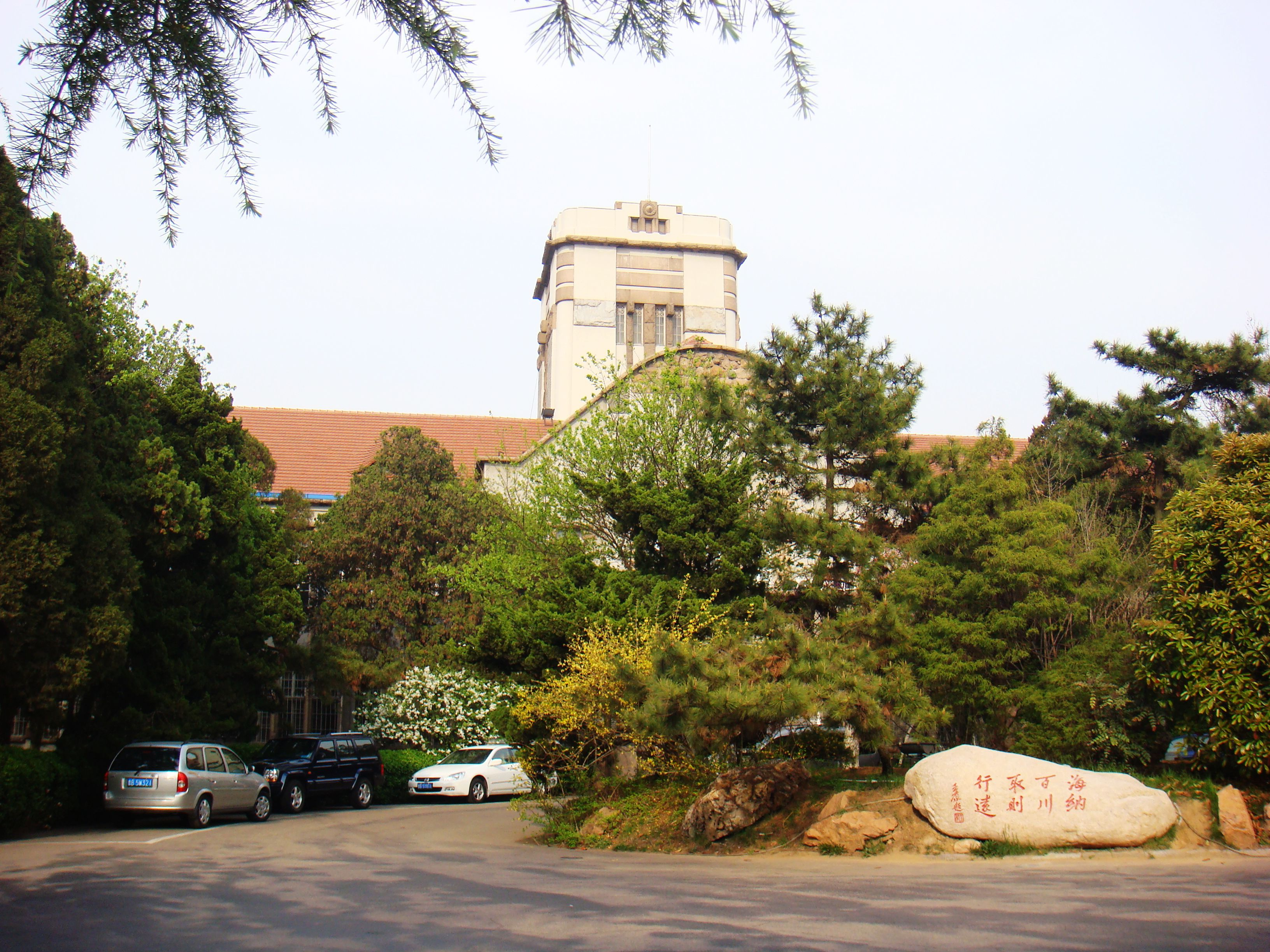
Yushan campus of the university

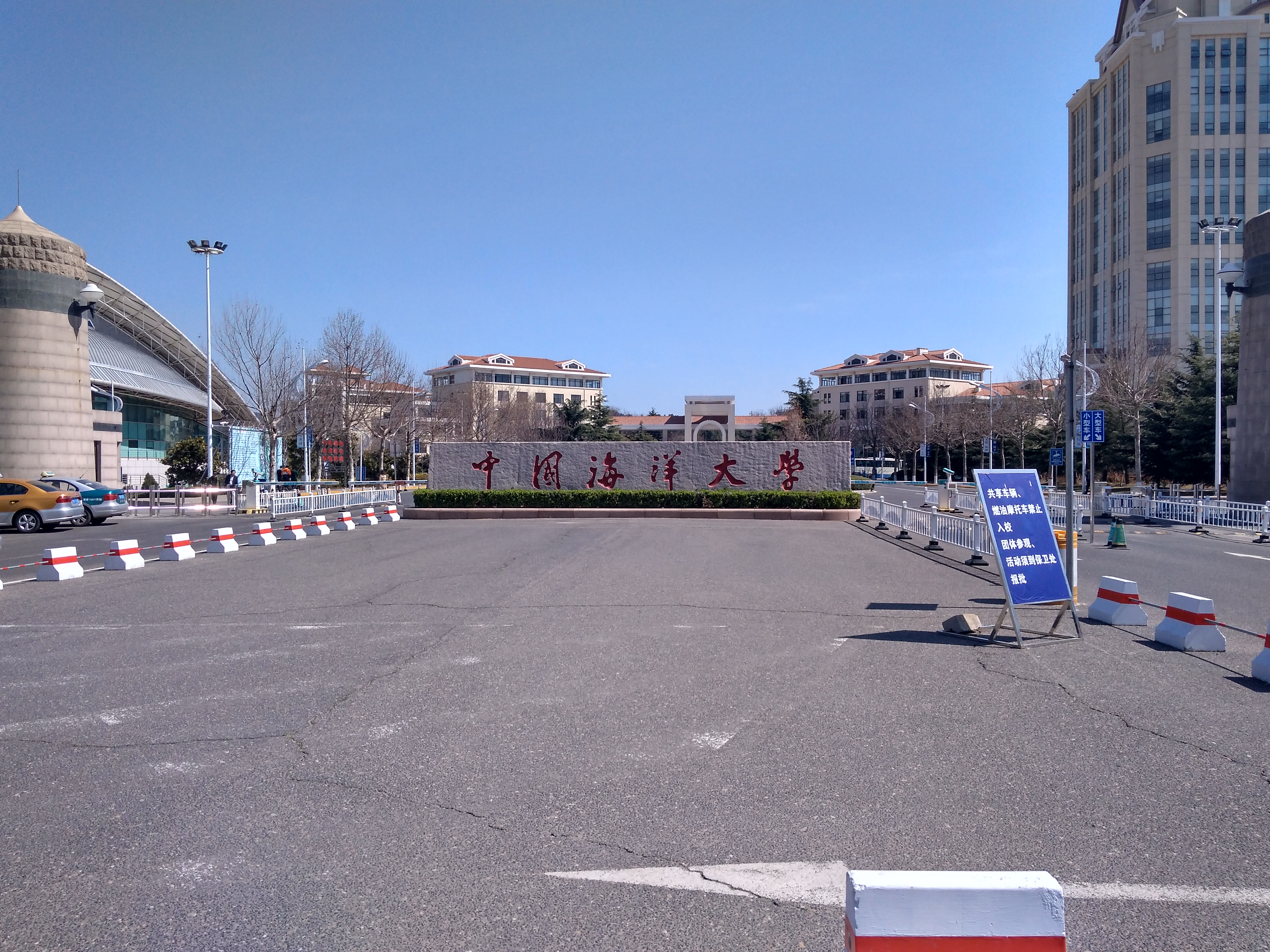
The entrance of Ocean University of China Laoshan Campus

The first campus of Haida is the site of former German Bismarck Barracks which is known as Yushan Campus (鱼山校区). It is situated on a hill with a view of the sea in the previous German Concession part of Shinan District. Featuring German-style architecture built in the early 1920s, it is especially renowned for its beauty. The surrounding area is a popular tourist destination that includes several churches and Zhan Qiao pier. Fushan campus is located adjacent to Qingdao University and is by far the smallest constituent part, since most departments moved to the newest campus in Laoshan District that was opened in the fall of 2006. Taken together, the university covers a combined area of more than 733,000 m^{2}, and has a floor space of 230,000 m^{2}.

== Structure ==
In 1994, the university was placed under the dual leadership of the State Education Commission and the People's Government of Shandong Province. It was admitted to the 211 Project in June 1997 and is also one of the 39 universities that make up the 985 Project.

=== Colleges ===
- College of Physical and Environmental Oceanography
- College of Information Science and Engineering
- College of Chemistry and Chemical Engineering
- College of Marine Geo-sciences
- College of Fisheries
- College of Marine Life Science
- College of Food Science and Engineering
- School of Medicine and Pharmaceutics
- College of Engineering
- College of Environmental Science and Engineering
- College of Management
- College of Economics
- College of Foreign Languages
- College of Liberal Arts, Journalism and Communication
- School of Law
- School of International Affairs and Public Administration
- College of Mathematical Sciences
- School of Materials Science and Engineering
- College of International Education
- Teaching Center for Fundamental Courses

=== Programs ===
The Ocean University of China was one of the first universities authorized by the State Council's Academic Degree Committee to confer doctoral, master and bachelor's degrees. It is also authorized to confer all academic titles including professors and Ph.D. supervisors. Currently, the university offers 69 undergraduate programs administered within 22 colleges and departments. 13 first level and 80 second level doctoral programs as well as 34 first level and 192 second level master programs are offered. In addition, the university provides 12 post-doctoral research stations.

Ocean University of China boasts two national key disciplines (including ten sub-disciplines) and 20 provincial key disciplines. Seven key research labs affiliated with the Ministry of Education of the People's Republic of China, nine key research labs affiliated with Shandong Province, and four key research labs affiliated with Qingdao Municipality have been set up in the university. In addition, the university has three engineering research centers affiliated with the Ministry of Education of the People's Republic of China and two engineering research centers affiliated to Shandong Province. The Qingdao Marine Science and Technology National Laboratory, headed by OUC, with an estimated total investment of one billion Chinese yuan, is currently under construction. The university has also set up a national base for training talents to be engaged in basic research and teaching in the fields of oceanology and marine chemistry.

The university has approximately 39,500 enrolled students, more than 8500 of whom are doctoral and master students and about 900 are foreign students. The university has a staff of around 2,800 people, with more than half of them being professors or lecturers. Many of them are specialists or scholars well-known both at home and abroad. Among them are three academicians of the Chinese Academy of Sciences, five academicians of the Chinese Academy of Engineering and more than 250 Ph.D. supervisors. 105 professors enjoy special subsidies from the State Council while 9 professors have been recognized as having made great contributions to the state at a young age (国家级有突出贡献的中青年专家). Wang Meng, a famous modern Chinese writer, is a professor at OUC, and also an Honorary Dean of the College of Literature, Journalism and Communication.

=== Facilities and research ===
Under the university's self-understanding, its objectives are to increase reform in education and teaching, continue to focus on its specialties and to meet the need of social and economic development. The school guideline of "Unity, Diligence, Practicality and Creativity" strives to cultivate a unique educational style and school discipline.

The university has a 3500-ton marine vessel, the Dongfanghong 2 (Red East, 东方红2号). It is 96 meters long and 15 meters wide and is considered one of the most advanced research vessels in China. The ship is both used in comprehensive and systematic research in multi-disciplines including hydrology, meteorology, physics, chemistry, biology, geology and geophysics as well as for fieldwork done by students at sea.

The facilities of Haida include dozens of laboratories, an Audio-Visual Education Center, a Computer Center and an Analyzing and Testing Center. The school library has a collection of over 1.9 million books, 1.1 million E-books and more than 30.000 Chinese and foreign journals and periodicals. The Journal of Ocean University China is a regular publication of the university that features both natural science and social science editions. The campus computer network has over 3,000 user-terminals that are connected with CERNET.

Almost all of the scientific work and publication in marine sciences in China has been done by faculty members of Haida. Practical solutions for the development of sea trade in the province is also assisted by the university, such as in the constructions of port sites in Rizhao and Dongying. The university has set up 27 research institutions, among which the Marine Development Studies Centre, the Qingdao National Research Center for Marine Science and the UNESCO Chinese Center of Marine Biotechnology are among the most prolific. Apart from a large number of facilities that specialize in fields connected to marine science, some also conduct research into the humanities, such as the German Studies Center.

=== International cooperation ===
The university has established cooperative and exchange relationship with over 140 universities and research institutions in more than 20 foreign countries or regions. Out of those, 105 institutions have also signed cooperation agreements with OUC. International conferences on Marine Science and other subjects are held at a regular pace. Joint education with other universities has led to several joint education programs, including the Sino-German Initiative in Marine Sciences Master.

The Sino-Australian Research Centre for Coastal Management (SARCCM) has a multidisciplinary focus, working in coastal management research. It is located at the UNSW Canberra at ADFA, a campus of the University of New South Wales located in Canberra in the Australian Capital Territory.

The university is an active member of the University of the Arctic. UArctic is an international cooperative network based in the Circumpolar Arctic region, consisting of more than 200 universities, colleges, and other organizations with an interest in promoting education and research in the Arctic region.

== Rankings ==
University rankings

Global – Overall
- ARWU World: 301-400 (2025)
- QS World: 801-850 (2026)
- THE World: 601-800 (2026)
- USNWR Global: 464 (2025)

Regional – Overall
- QS Asia: 297 (2025)
- USNWR Asia: 117 (2025)

National – Overall
- ARWU National: 56 (2025)

In 2025, ARWU ranked the university 301-400th in the world and 56th nationally in China. The QS World University Rankings ranked the university 297th in Asia in 2025.
