= 2025 in China =

- Decades: 2000s; 2010s; 2020s
- See also: Other events of 2025; History of China • Timeline • Years

Events in the year 2025 in China.

== Incumbents ==
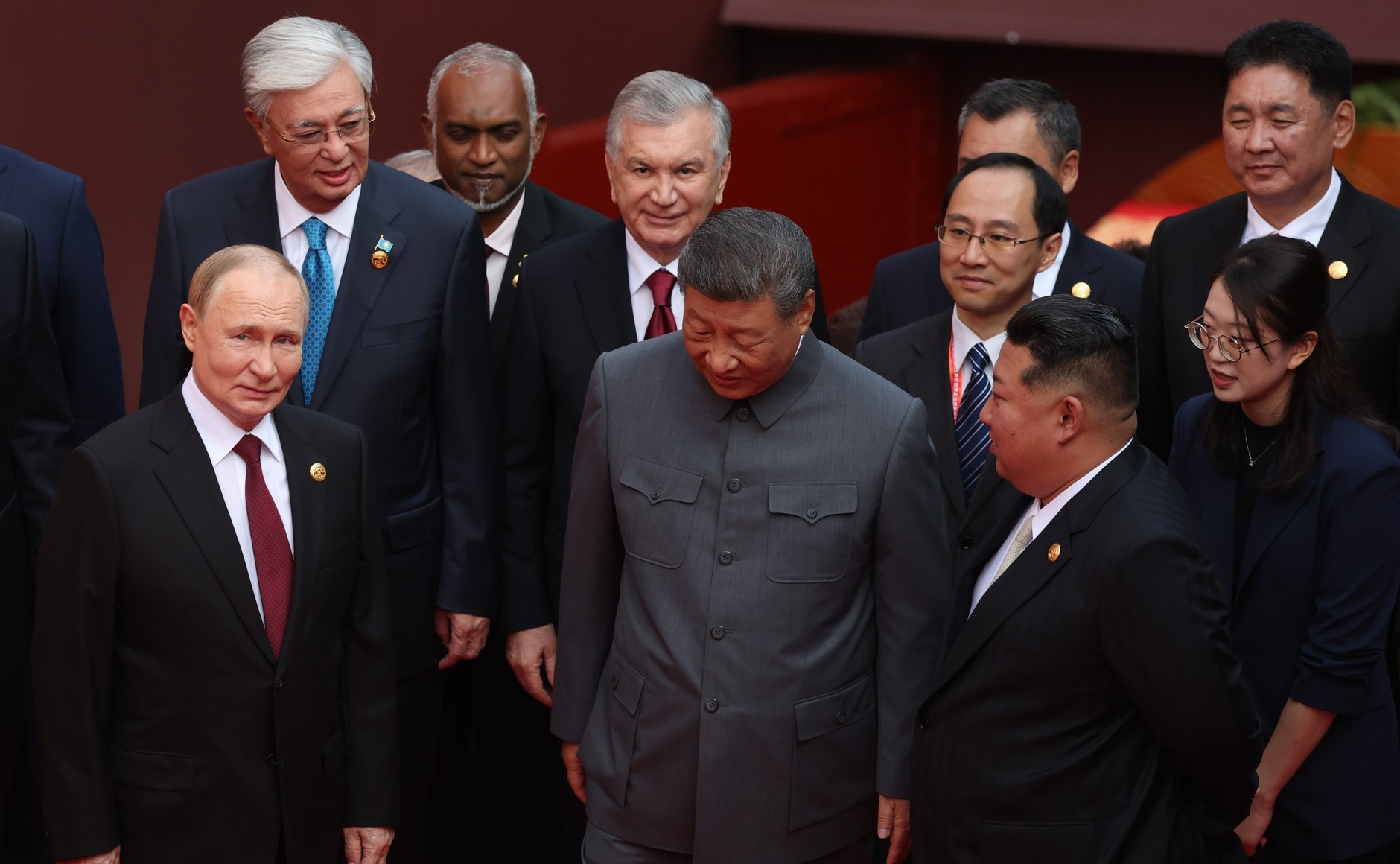
CCP General Secretary Xi Jinping with North Korean leader Kim Jong Un and Russian leader Vladimir Putin prior to the 2025 China Victory Day Parade in Beijing

- General Secretary of the Chinese Communist Party (paramount leader) – Xi Jinping
- President – Xi Jinping
- Premier – Li Qiang
- Congress chairman – Zhao Leji
- Consultative Conference chairman – Wang Huning
- Vice President – Han Zheng
- Supervision Commission director – Liu Jinguo

== Events ==
=== January ===
- 2 January – A magnitude 4.8 earthquake hits Ningxia, injuring six people.
- 4 January – Eight people are killed in a fire at a market in Zhangjiakou, Hebei.
- 7 January – A magnitude 7.1 earthquake hits Tibet, killing at least 126 people.
- 20 January –
  - Fan Weiqiu is executed for committing the 2024 Zhuhai car attack.
  - Xu Jiajin is executed for committing the 2024 Wuxi stabbing attack.
- 22 January – A truck rams into 12 vehicles in Bazhong, Sichuan, killing five people.

=== February ===
- 1 February – US President Donald Trump imposes a 10% tariff on imports from China.
- 3 February – China imposes export controls and increased tariffs on certain American imports in retaliation for President Trump's imposition of tariffs on Chinese goods.
- 4 February – The United States Postal Service indefinitely suspends its acceptance of parcels from China and Hong Kong.
- 7–14 February – The 2025 Asian Winter Games are held in Harbin, with China placing first in terms of medals with 32 golds, 26 silvers, and 24 bronzes and achieving its highest medal tally in the history of the competition.
- 8 February – At least one person is killed while 28 others are reported missing after a landslide hits the village of Jinping in Junlian County, Sichuan.
- 11–16 February – 2025 Badminton Asia Mixed Team Championships in Qingdao.
- 19 February – Mixue surpasses Starbucks and McDonald's as the world's largest foodservice chain by store count.
- 25 February – An oil spill cleaning vessel collides with a ferry along the Yuanshui River in Hunan, killing at least 11 people.
- 28 February – Convicted child trafficker Yu Huaying, who trafficked a total of 17 children between 1993 and 2003, is executed.

=== March ===
- 4 March –
  - Chengdu-based architect Liu Jiakun is awarded the Pritzker Architecture Prize.
  - U.S. President Donald Trump increases the tariffs imposed by the United States on Chinese imports in February to 20%.
- 15 March – A fighter jet of the People's Liberation Army Navy crashes into an open area in Hainan. The pilot is rescued after ejecting.
- 19 March – The Ministry of State Security announces that a engineer who previously worked at a research institution has been sentenced to death for selling classified material to foreign intelligence agencies.
- 20 March – Global Affairs Canada announces that four Canadian-Chinese nationals had been executed in China earlier in the year for drug offences.
- 21–23 March – 2025 World Athletics Indoor Championships
- 31 March – The China National Offshore Oil Corporation announces the discovery of a major oil field in the South China Sea off the coast of Shenzhen.

=== April ===
- 3 April – Three Filipino nationals are arrested in Beijing on suspicion of spying for Philippine intelligence.
- 8 April – Twenty people are killed in a fire at a nursing home in Chengde.
- 9 April – President Trump increases tariffs on Chinese exports to the United States to 104%, prompting China to impose an 84% tariff on American imports.
- 22 April – At least five people are injured in a vehicle-ramming attack on pedestrians outside a school, in Jinhua, Zhejiang.
- 27 April – The China Coast Guard is reported to have seized Sand Cay, which is also claimed by the Philippines, in the South China Sea.
- 29 April – Twenty-two people are killed in a fire at a restaurant in Liaoyang, Liaoning.
- 30 April – China lifts sanctions placed in 2021 on five MEPs over their criticism of human rights abuses against Uyghurs in Xinjiang, following negotiations with European Parliament President Roberta Metsola.

=== May ===
- 2 May – A tourist helicopter crashes in a park in Suzhou, killing one person on the ground and injuring all four passengers.
- 4 May –
  - Four tourist boats capsize due to strong winds in Qianxi, Guizhou, killing 10 people.
  - A car driven by a drunk driver ploughs through a bus stop in Tengzhou, killing six people and injuring two others.
- 5 May – Zhao Xintong becomes the first person from both China and Asia to win the World Snooker Championship after defeating Mark Williams 18-12 in the final held at the Crucible Theatre in Sheffield, United Kingdom.
- 12 May –
  - The United States and China agree to a 90 day-period to reduce their tariff rates from 145% to 30% and 125% to 10% respectively pending further negotiations.
  - China approves the establishment of a new national-level fast intellectual property rights protection service center in Shenzhen's Futian district.
- 15 May – Four people are injured in a car-ramming near a school in Beijing.
- 18 May – One person is killed while two others are injured in a shooting at a restaurant in Wuhan.
- 19 May – Three miners are killed in a flooding incident at a coal mine in Gansu.
- 22 May – At least two people are killed while 19 others are reported missing following landslides in Guizhou.
- 25 May – The world's first humanoid robot fighting competition is held in Hangzhou.
- 27 May – Five people are killed in an explosion at a chemical plant in Weifang, Shandong.

=== June ===
- 12 June – The homes of six people in Hong Kong are raided in the first publicly known joint operation by Hong Kong and mainland Chinese authorities under the 2020 Hong Kong national security law.
- 13 June – Tropical Storm Wutip makes landfall in Hainan as a severe tropical storm.
- 16 June – Nine people are killed in an explosion at a firecracker factory in Linli County, Hunan.
- 19 June – Doctoral student Zhenhao Zou is sentenced to life imprisonment with a minimum term of 24 years by a judge in the United Kingdom for the rapes of 10 women in the UK and China from 2019 to 2023.
- 25 June – China reaches an agreement allowing the export of rare earth minerals to the United States.
- 26 June –
  - At least six people are killed following two days of flooding in Guizhou.
  - A vehicle-ramming incident occurs in Miyun, Beijing.
- 30 June –
  - China lifts a ban on seafood imports from Japan that it imposed in 2023 in response to the dumping of radioactive wastewater from the Fukushima Daiichi Nuclear Power Plant into the Pacific Ocean.
  - The first China-Europe freight train via the Trans-Caspian International Transport Route departs from Beijing's Fangshan district.

=== July ===
- 5 July – The first Legoland in China opens in Shanghai.
- 8 July –
  - Around 233 children are reported to have been hospitalised for lead poisoning in Tianshui, Gansu, after consuming school meals prepared with inedible paint.
  - The Friendship Bridge connecting Tibet and Nepal is swept away due to flooding along the Bhotekoshi River, killing nine people and leaving 19 others missing.
- 11 July – The Xixia Imperial Tombs are designated as World Heritage Sites by UNESCO.
- 13–20 July – 2025 FIBA Women's Asia Cup
- 16 July – A court in Beijing sentences a Japanese national to three years' imprisonment for espionage.
- 19 July – Construction formally begins on the Yarlung Zangbo hydropower project in Tibet.
- 20 July – Typhoon Wipha makes landfall in Guangdong, causing strong winds, fallen trees, and disruptions to transportation.
- 23 July –
  - Six Northeastern University students are killed and a teacher is injured after protective grates over a flotation cell collapse at the Wunugetushan gold mine near Manzhouli, Inner Mongolia.
  - An outbreak of chikungunya is declared in Foshan, with the number of cases reaching 4,014 on 25 July.
- 27 July –
  - The Shaolin Temple announces that Abbot Shi Yongxin is under investigation for alleged embezzlement of temple funds and violations of Buddhist precepts.
  - 12-year-old Chinese swimmer Yu Zidi makes her international debut at the 2025 World Aquatics Championships in Singapore.
- 28 July – Four people are killed in a landslide caused by heavy rains near Chengde.
- 29 July – At least 30 people are killed in flooding caused by heavy rains in Miyun and Yanqing Districts in Beijing.
- 31 July –
  - A Japanese national is injured in an attack along the Suzhou Metro.
  - Chinese authorities in Changsha detain Zhang Yadi, a 22-year-old student known for overseas pro-Tibet activism, on suspicion of "inciting separatism."

=== August ===
- 6 August – A suspension bridge collapses in the Xiata Scenic Area in Zhaosu County in the Ili Kazakh Autonomous Prefecture of Xinjiang, killing five people.
- 7 August – At least 13 people are killed while 33 others are reported missing in flash floods in Gansu.
- 7–17 August – 2025 World Games in Chengdu.
- 11 August – A China Coast Guard vessel is damaged after colliding with a People's Liberation Army Navy ship while trying to expel a Philippine Coast Guard vessel from Scarborough Shoal.
- 12 August – China severs official relations with Czech President Petr Pavel in response to him meeting with the Dalai Lama.
- 13 August – China imposes sanctions on the Lithuanian banks UAB Urbo Bankas and Mano Bankas AB in response to sanctions imposed by the European Union on Chinese financial institutions accused of supporting the Russian invasion of Ukraine.
- 16 August – Ten people are killed while two others are reported missing following a flash flood that hits a campsite in Urad Rear Banner, Inner Mongolia.
- 22 August – An under-construction railway bridge collapses into the Yellow River in Qinghai, killing 12 people and leaving four others missing.
- 31 August – 1 September – 2025 Tianjin SCO summit.

=== September ===
- 3 September – China's Victory over Japan Day 80th Anniversary Parade is held in Beijing, commemorating the end of the Second Sino-Japanese War and World War II. Over 12,000 soldiers of the People's Liberation Army participate in the parade.
- 10 September – The State Council of China approves the creation of the Huangyan Island National Nature Reserve in the disputed Scarborough Shoal claimed by the Philippines.
- 16 September – China reaches an agreement with the United States to allow TikTok to continue operating in the US.
- 25 September –
  - China imposes sanctions on six American firms for undermining national security and military-technical collaboration with Taiwan.
  - China reopens the Sinuiju-Dandong land postal route with North Korea for the first time since the COVID-19 pandemic in 2020.
- 27 September – A magnitude 5.6 earthquake hits Gansu, injuring 11 people.
- 28 September –
  - The Huajiang Canyon Bridge, with a height of 625 m (2,051 ft), is opened in Guizhou as the world's highest bridge.
  - A court in Jilin sentences former agriculture minister Tang Renjian to a two-year suspended death sentence for accepting more than 268 million yuan ($87 million) in bribes from 2007 to 2024.
- 27 September – The Daqingshan and Zhouzhi National Nature Reserves are designated as biosphere reserves by UNESCO.
- 29 September – A court in Wenzhou sentences 11 members of the Ming crime family to death for running various criminal activities in the Myanmar border town of Laukkai and sentences 28 others to prison sentences reaching up to life imprisonment.

=== October ===
- 5 October – Around 500 hikers are reported stranded following a sudden snowstorm on the Tibetan side of Mount Everest.
- 6 October – A hiker dies following a sudden snowstorm on the Tibetan Plateau in Qinghai.
- 11 October – Jin Mingri, the founder of the banned Beijing Zion Church, is arrested along with 29 other senior church leaders on unspecified charges following nationwide raids.
- 14 October – China imposes sanctions on five US subsidiaries of the South Korean shipbuilder Hanwha Ocean on charges of supporting a US government investigation into the shipping industry.
- 17 October – Nine senior generals, including Central Military Commission vice chair He Weidong, are expelled by the Chinese Communist Party on charges of serious financial crimes.
- 27 October – Flights between China and India resume for the first time since 2020 following a suspension caused by the COVID-19 pandemic and the 2020–2021 China–India skirmishes.
- 31 October – China sends its youngest astronaut, 32-year old Wu Fei, to space aboard the Shenzhou-21 launched from the Jiuquan Satellite Launch Center.

=== November ===
- 4 November – A court in Shenzhen sentences seven members of the Bai crime family to death for running various criminal activities in the Myanmar border town of Laukkai and sentences 14 others to prison sentences reaching up to life imprisonment.
- 5 November – Japan resumes exports of seafood to China for the first time since a ban imposed by the latter in 2023 over the discharge of radioactive water of the Fukushima Daiichi Nuclear Power Plant.
- 10 November – The Ministry of Commerce announces a one-year suspension of the sanctions on Hanwha Ocean's U.S.-related units, effective immediately.
- 12 November –
  - Crime kingpin She Zhijiang is extradited from Thailand to China to face charges related to operating cybercrime and illegal gambling networks across Asia.
  - King Vajiralongkorn arrives in Beijing as part of the first visit by a Thai monarch to China.
- 14 November – China issues a travel advisory against its citizens going to Japan in response to comments by Japanese prime minister Sanae Takaichi expressing support for Japanese military intervention in a Chinese invasion of Taiwan.
- 27 November – A train carrying out testing for seismic equipment hits a group of railway maintenance workers in Luoyangzhen station in Kunming, killing 11 people and injuring two others.

=== December ===
- 2 December – A confrontation occurs in disputed circumstances between the Japan Coast Guard and the China Coast Guard following the entry of a Japanese fishing vessel in the disputed Senkaku Islands.
- 8 December –
  - China's trade surplus surpasses $1 trillion for the first time.
  - A court in Beijing orders Malaysia Airlines to pay 2.9 million yuan ($410,000) each to the families of eight passengers who disappeared aboard Malaysia Airlines Flight 370 in 2014.
- 9 December –
  - China executes Bai Tianhui, the former general manager of China Huarong International Holdings, following his conviction for accepting more than US$156 million from 2014 to 2018.
  - Twelve people are killed in a fire at a four-storey residential building in Shantou.
- 18 December – China splits off Hainan into its own duty-free customs zone, similar to Hong Kong.
- 22 December – The commerce ministry imposes a provisional set of 42.7% tariffs on dairy products, including milk and cheese, imported from the European Union.
- 26 December
  - Cross-strait relations: China imposes sanctions on 30 American individuals and entities for selling weapons to Taiwan.
  - The National People's Congress passes a revised trade law to expand the government's authority to counter trade restrictions, regulate exports of strategic material, and update provisions on digital, green, and intellectual property trade from 1 March 2026.
- 29–30 December – China conducts live fire military drills, code-named "Justice Mission 2025", around Taiwan.

== Holidays ==
- 1 January – New Year's Day
- 28 January – 4 February – Chinese New Year
- 4 April – Tomb-Sweeping Day
- 1–2 May – Labour Day
- 31 May – Dragon Boat Festival
- 1–7 October – National Day
- 6 October – Mid-Autumn Festival

== Art and entertainment ==
- List of Chinese submissions for the Academy Award for Best International Feature Film
- 2025 in Chinese music

== Deaths ==
- 5 January: Wang Zhengguo, 89, field medical engineer.
- 8 January: Wu Lusheng, 94, architect.
- 11 January: Qiu Dahong, 94, coastal and offshore engineer, member of the Chinese Academy of Sciences.
- 2 June: Xu Qiliang, 75, military officer, vice chairman of the Central Military Commission (2012–2023) and commander of the PLA Air Force (2007–2012).
- 4 August: Wang Yousheng, 97, engineer.
- 6 September: Placidus Pei Ronggui, 92, Roman Catholic prelate, coadjutor bishop of Luoyang (2003–2011).
- 11 September: Yu Menglong, 37, actor (Go Princess Go, Eternal Love, The Legend of the White Snake).
- 23 September: Kongjian Yu, 62, architect.
- 18 October: Yang Chen-Ning, 103, theoretical physicist (Yang-Mills theory, Wu–Yang monopole, Lee–Yang theorem), Nobel Prize laureate (1957).
- 29 October: Julius Jia Zhiguo, 90, Roman Catholic prelate, bishop of Zhengding (since 1980).
- 8 December: Wang Bingqian, 100, economist and politician, minister of finance (1980–1992), state councillor (1983–1993), and vice chairperson of the SCNPC (1993–1998).
- 9 December: Bai Tianhui, 47, politician.
- 17 December: Liu Minfu, 87, politician.

== See also ==
- Timeline of Chinese history
- Years in China
