= Museum of Contemporary Art Chengdu =

Contemporary art museum in Chengdu, China

Museum of Contemporary Art Chengdu (MoCA)
- 成都当代美术馆
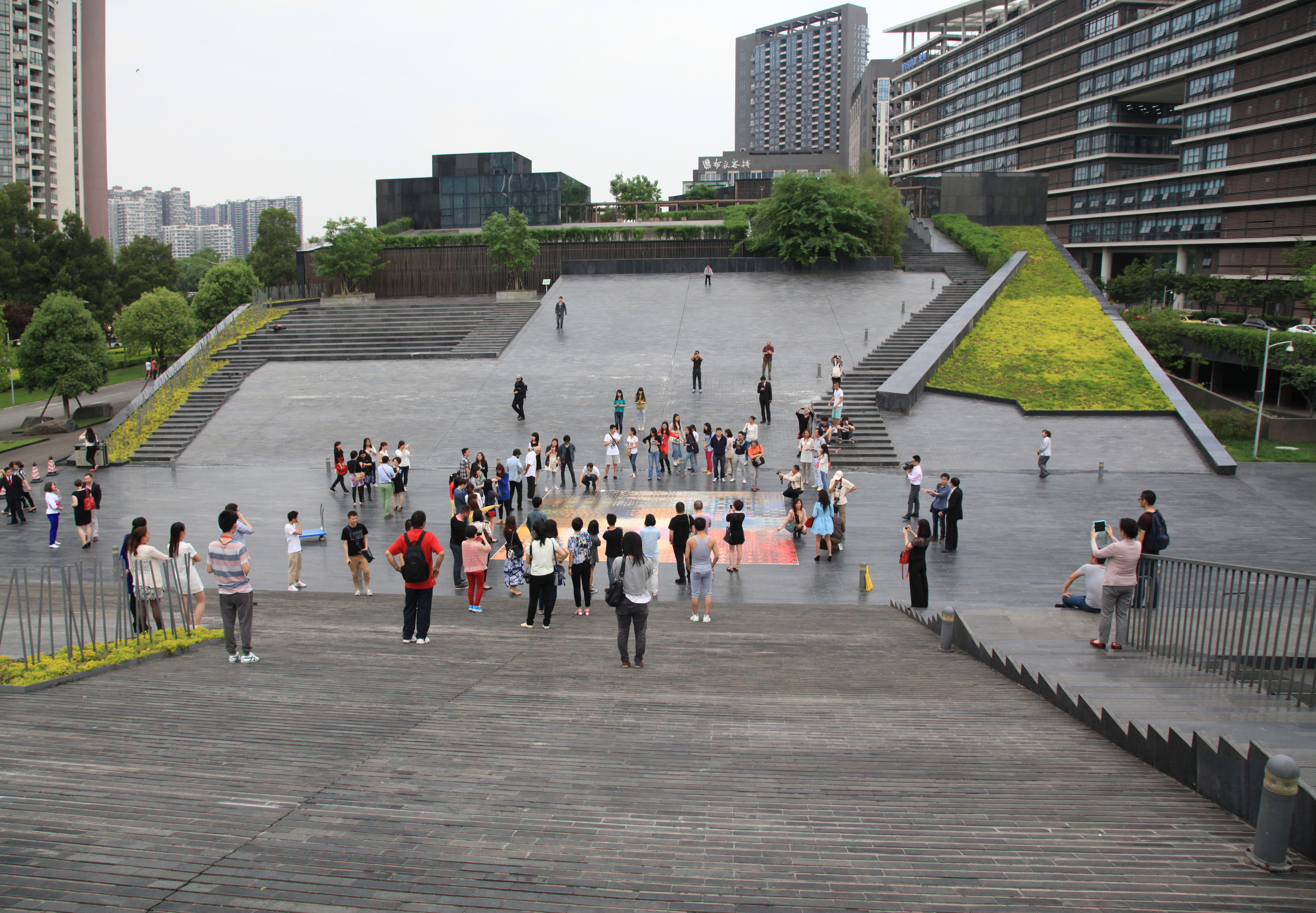
- A Stitch in Time, an artwork by Michael Pinsky being assembled at the museum
- Established: 2011; 15 years ago
- Location: C1, Tianfu Software Park, Tianfu Avenue, Gaoxin District, Chengdu, Sichuan, China
- Coordinates: 30.55°N 104.04°E
- Type: Public museum
- Website: chengdumoca.org (archived)

The Museum of Contemporary Art Chengdu (MoCA; Chinese: 成都当代美术馆) is a museum of contemporary art at Chengdu Tianfu Software Park in Chengdu, Sichuan, China. It was founded by an investment company established by the Chengdu High-tech Zone Administrative Committee.

== History ==
The museum opened in 2011, in a building designed by the architect Liu Jiakun. Construction of the museum was funded by the Chengdu High-tech Zone Administrative Committee through Chengdu High-Tech Zone Investment Co. Ltd. The museum's first director was the art historian, critic and curator Lü Peng.

By 2014, the museum still did not have a display of its permanent collection, but had opened its gallery for temporary exhibitions of modern art and photographic art.

The museum has hosted exhibitions from Asian artists and retrospectives of Western artists including: Tony Cragg, Michael Pinsky and Picasso. The museum collaborated with the Musée d'Art Moderne de la Ville de Paris to show the works of Dominique Gonzalez–Foerster, Douglas Gordon, Pierre Huyghe, Ange Leccia and Philippe Parreno.
