= Xiang Xuan =

Chinese military personnel (1926–2023)

- 向轩
- Xiang in 2020
- Born: March 1926; Sangzhi, Hunan, China
- Died: February 10, 2023 (aged 96); Chengdu, Sichuan, China
- Relatives: He Long (uncle); He Ying (aunt)
- Military career
- Allegiance: People's Republic of China
- Branch: Chinese Red Army; People's Liberation Army
- Service years: 1933–1982
- Rank: Colonel
- Conflicts: Second Sino-Japanese War; Chinese Civil War
- Awards: Order of Bayi (Third Class); Order of Independence and Freedom (Third Class); Order of Liberation (Third Class); Red Star Meritorious Medal (Third Class)

Xiang Xuan (Chinese: 向轩; pinyin: Xiàng Xuān; Wade–Giles: Hsiang Hsüan; March 1926 – February 10, 2023) was a Chinese colonel in the People's Liberation Army and the nephew of He Long, a marshal of the People's Republic of China. Following the death of his mother and aunt, Xiang joined the Chinese Red Army in 1933 and in 1935, at the age of nine, took part in the Long March, making him the youngest soldier to take part in it.

== Early life ==
Xiang was a member of the Tujia ethnic group. He was born in March 1926 in Sangzhi, Hunan and was one of five children born to He Mangu, the younger sister of He Long, and Xiang Shenghui. Before his birth, He Mangu joined the Chinese Communist Party and began taking part in revolutionary activities with her siblings. In 1928, Xiang Shengui led his guerilla unit in attacking Kuomintang forces in Shishou and Jianli counties in Hubei. Facing stiff counterattack by enemy forces, He Mangu moved her children including Xiang Xuan to a village in Yongshun County, Hunan. After they ran out of ammunition, He Mangu and her three children were apprehended by the Kuomintang and they were taken as prisoners back to Sangzhi, Hunan. He Mangu's elder sister He Ying bribed the prison guards which led to the release of He Mangu's children including Xiang. He Mangu was tortured and executed while in captivity on 16 September 1928.

In the aftermath of the death of He Mangu, He Ying took He Mangu's children and since she did not have any offspring, she adopted Xiang who started to see He Ying as his new mother. On 1933, Xiang along with He Ying and her guerilla unit moved to a base in Hefeng, Hubei. On 6 May 1933, the base was surrounded by enemy troops after its position was given away by locals. As the unit began to lose the battle, He Ying ordered Xiang to escape with local guerillas to meet up with his uncle He Long and gave him a bag containing a ring, five silver dollars and a small pistol. He Ying was killed in the battle and Xiang Xuan followed the remainder of the guerilla unit in meeting up with He Long at the mountains near the border of Guizhou.

== Military service ==
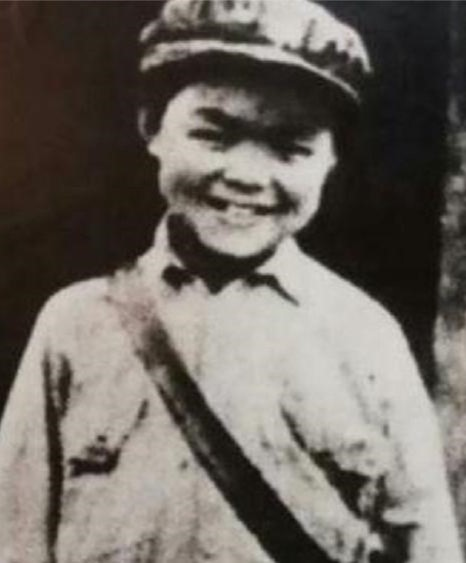
Xiang as a child soldier in the Chinese Red Army

Xiang's military service officially began on 1933 following his escape in the aftermath of the death of his aunt. Later that year, he became a soldier in He Long's Second Red Army Corps in the Chinese Red Army. In November 1935, more than 17,000 soldiers from the Second and Sixth Red Army Corps, led by He Long, took part in the Long March, a military retreat by the Chinese Red Army from advancing Kuomintang forces during the Chinese Civil War, from Sangzhi, Hunan. During the march, he rode on a mule and crossed Yuanshui, Chishui and Jinsha Rivers, and Wumeng Mountains. At the age of 9, he was the youngest soldier to participate in the march. In October 1936, Xiang and the remainder of the soldiers arrived at the new Communist base of operations in Yan'an, Shaanxi. He continued to stay in Yan'an to take extra cultural classes. He attended primary school in the Shaanxi-Gansu-Ningxia Border Region and later graduated from the Anti-Japanese University.

From 1936, he served as deputy squad leader of the communications squad of the Second Red Front Army and during the Second Sino-Japanese War, he served as communications officer at the 120th Division Headquarters of the Eighth Route Army. From April 1943, he served as a soldier in the Guard Company of the 358th Brigade of the Eighth Route Army. After studying engineering, he served as deputy company commander of the 358th Brigade Engineer Company in the Northwest Field Army during the continuation of the Chinese Civil War. In 1948, at a battle in Dali County, Shaanxi, Xiang served as the engineering company commander for the Northwest Field Army. During the battle, he utilized altered soil to detonate pillboxes of the National Revolutionary Army but sustained severe injuries including nearly losing sight in his right eye and shrapnel wounds throughout his body.

Following the founding of the People's Republic of China in 1949, Xiang continued to serve in numerous military positions within the People's Liberation Army. In 1955, he was promoted to lieutenant colonel and in 1960, he was promoted to colonel. In December 1960, he was appointed as the deputy section chief of the Ordnance Section of the Logistics Department of the Chengdu Military Division within the Chengdu Military Region. In November 1978, he served as deputy minister of the People's Armed Forces Department of Xicheng District in Chengdu Military Division of Sichuan Provincial Military Region. In December 1982, he retired from military service.

== Later life ==
After his retirement, Xiang continued to reside in Chengdu. He died on 10 February 2023 at a hospital following illness, at the age of 96. (Note: Following the Chinese way of counting, his age is often given as 97.) His funeral service was attended by politicians from Sichuan and Hunan.

== Awards and decorations ==
His decorations include:

- August 1 Medal (Third class)
- Order of Independence and Freedom (Third class)
- Order of Liberation (Third class)
- Red Star Meritorious Medal (Third class)
