= List of exports of China =

Exports of China by product category (2019) Chemical products Transportation Machines Mineral products Plastics and rubbers Metals Foodstuffs Precious metals Textiles Instruments Animal products Vegetable products Paper goods Footwear and headwear Miscellaneous Stone and glass Wood products Animal and vegetable bi-products Animal hides Arts and antiques Weapons

The following is a list of the exports of China.

Data is for 2022, in billions of US$, as reported by the Observatory of Economic Complexity. The top thirty exports are listed.

#	Product	Value
1	Computers	210.231
2	Broadcasting equipment	110.979
3	Telephones	91.759
4	Office machine parts	47.079
5	Integrated circuits	41.653
6	Broadcasting accessories	29.462
7	Semiconductor devices	29.001
8	Electrical transformers	25.191
9	Other furniture	25.051
10	Knit sweaters	24.182
11	Trunks and cases	23.786
12	Video displays	21.916
13	Vehicle parts	21.693
14	Seats	21.537
15	Non-knit women's suits	21.121
16	Insulated wire	20.601
17	Video recording equipment	20.051
18	Electric heaters	18.750
19	Light fixtures	18.742
20	Rubber footwear	18.662
21	Industrial printers	18.333
22	Other plastic products	17.879
23	Printed circuit boards	17.251
24	Video and card games	17.108
25	Microphones and headphones	16.140
26	Low-voltage protection equipment	15.945
27	Leather shoes	15.823
28	Gold	15.754
29	Models and stuffed animals	15.169
30	Rubber tires	15.160

== See also ==
- List of exports of the United States
- List of exports of France
- List of exports of Russia
- List of exports of India
- List of exports of Thailand
- List of exports of Singapore
- List of exports of China
