= Michael Pinsky =

Visual artist and researcher

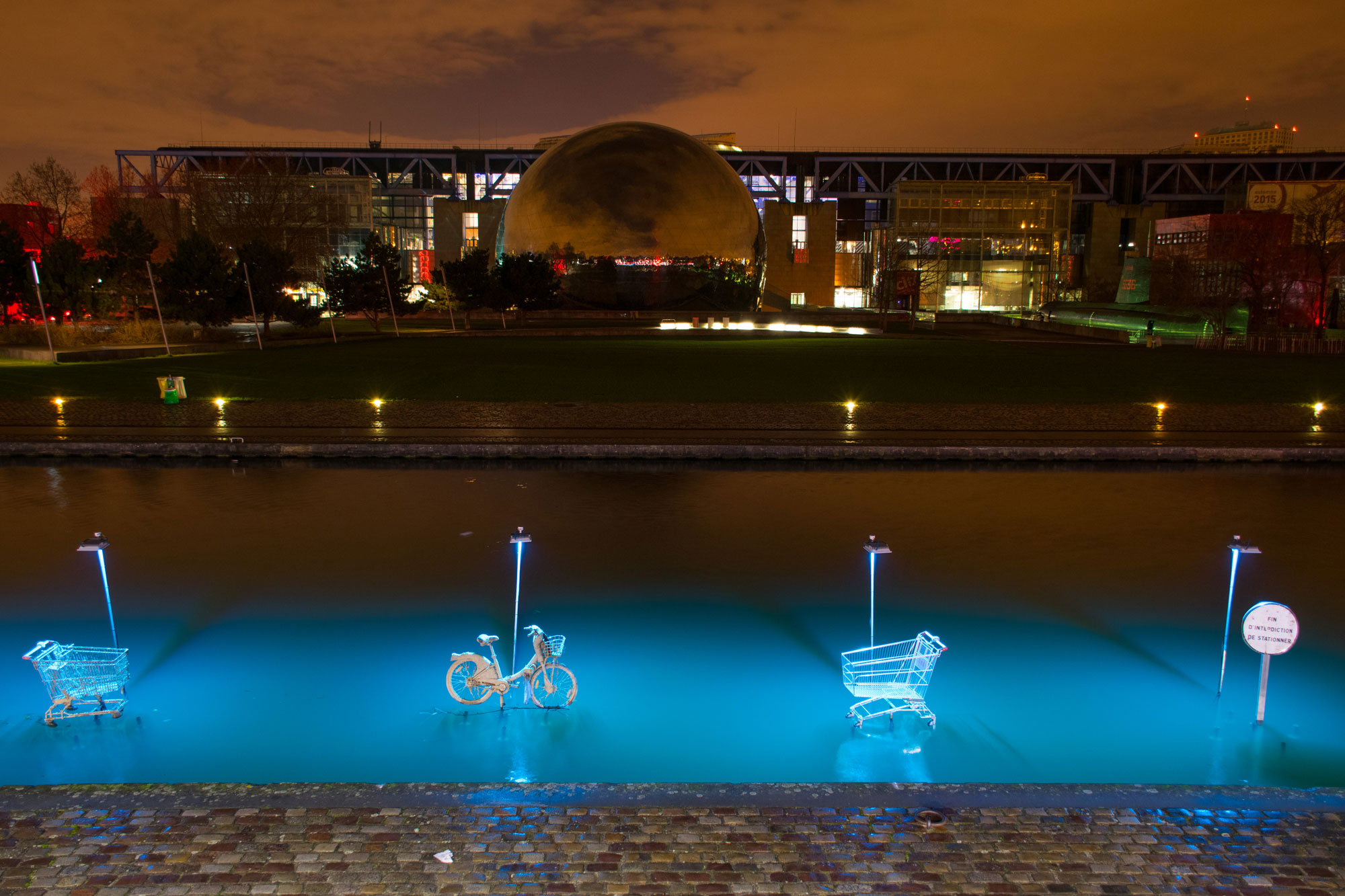
- L'eau Qui Dort by Michael Pinsky
- Born: Michael Pinsky; 1967 (age 58–59); Leadburn, Scotland
- Education: Royal College of Art, London
- Known for: Contemporary Art
- Website: http://www.michaelpinsky.com/

Michael Pinsky (born in 1967) is a British artist known for his environmental and socially engaged public art. His work often explores urban spaces, human impact on the environment, and the intersections of art, architecture, and activism. Pinsky's installations encourage public interaction and dialogue around contemporary issues, such as pollution, climate change, and sustainability.

== Education ==
Michael Pinsky studied in England at Manchester Polytechnic, the University of Brighton and at the Royal College of Art in London. He was awarded a Doctorate from the University of East London in 2000.

== Exhibitions and projects ==
Pinsky's work has been shown at: Somerset House, London, Museum of Contemporary Art, Chengdu; TATE Britain; Saatchi Gallery; Victoria and Albert Museum; Parc de la Villette, Paris;Institute of Contemporary Art; BALTIC, Gateshead; Centre for Contemporary Arts, Glasgow; Modern Art Oxford, Milton Keynes Gallery, Cornerhouse, Manchester; Liverpool Biennial, Centre de création contemporaine Olivier Debré; Armory Center of the Arts, Los Angeles and the Rotterdam International Architectural Biennial.

Pinsky's projects in the public realm have often courted controversy in the press. Notable projects include:

- Pollution Pods. The artist created a series of interlinked geodesic domes which contained polluted air from cities around the world. There was some confusion and concern about whether the environments within the domes could have a detrimental impact on visitors' health. During an interview for BBC1, the presenter David Sillito was "speechless" when the artist explained that he could not use genuine London air within the London pod. The Pollution Pods have been exhibited at the Starmus Festival, Trondheim, Somerset House, London, World Health Organisation's first international conference on Air Pollution, Place des Nations, Geneva, Klimahaus Bremerhaven, Germany, TED Annual Conference, Vancouver, Canada, Science Gallery Melbourne, Australia, UN Climate Action Summit, UN Buildings, New York City, COP 25, Madrid. COP 26, Glasgow KunstMuseum, Bonn, The Draiflession Collection St John's College, Oxford and COP 28. Greta Thunberg when visiting the Pollution Pods remarked "It's an incredible exhibition. It'll really bring attention to these problems, and if people can experience this, people from all around the world, how these people live every day, it will bring lots of attention and people will be more encouraged to deal with these problems". Dr Tedros Adhanom tweeted that the Pollution Pods successfully raised awareness about impacts of air pollution on health. Teresa Ribera, Minister for the Ecological Transition of Spain, said: "Air pollution and climate change are the two sides of the same coin. The symbolic installation of the Pollution Pods at COP25 should remind everybody that we are negotiating for cleaner environments, cutting emissions and gaining better health for all." Andy Burnham, remarked "Pollution Pods provide a really innovative and interesting way of allowing people to safely experience poor air quality for themselves" Artnet rated the Pollution Pods as one of the 100 Works of Art That Defined the Decade. Stir Magazine listed Pollution Pods as one of the ten most unforgettable artworks of 2019. The BBC featured the installation for Earth Day "as one of the best ways to change the world".
- City Speaks. The artist constructed a lectern which captured peoples voices and relayed what they said as enormous dot-matrix text ascending Hull's tidal barrier. Many media outlets claimed that the installation was being used for profanities, including a number of sexual references such as "send nudes" and "ejaculation". However, it was well received by many, the comedian Mark Steel, said that 'City Speaks' was "one of my favourite works of art ever".
- Plunge. The artist marked the predicted sea level in the year 3012 on major monuments throughout London. Giles Fraser, Canon Chancellor of St Paul's Cathedral stated that "this clever installation imagines a world where St Paul's Cathedral, the Donmar Warehouse and the Athenaeum are all under water, powerfully makes the climate change point". Charles Saatchi was a little less enthusiastic in the Evening Standard: "Pinsky's artwork may appear a little bleak and pessimistic to some viewers but particularly so to committed Global Warming deniers such as me". Maria Balshaw, Director of Tate discusses Plunge in her book Gathering of Strangers:
  For decades, artists have been at the forefront of demands for action. Some offer compelling visions for what our world could resemble if action is taken; others show us the brutal reality of life without change. There are thousands of works I could include here by way of example, but I would like to point to a piece of public art called Plunge, created in 2012 by the artist Michael Pinsky. The work encircled noteworthy buildings and monuments in London with an illuminated blue line, showing the predicted sea level in the year 3012. The public who encountered these lines on their journeys around the capital were invited to imagine just how much of London would lie below the water's surface. The lines were also intended to suggest a protective shell, indicating that we may still be able to change our situation. The overarching message of Pinsky's work, however, was that adaptation is essential if we want our low-lying capital city to remain habitable.
- L'eau Qui Dort. The artist dredged discarded objects from the depths of the Parisian canals and erected them on the surface of the water. This ecological project was commissioned for COP21, but the public interpretation of the work changed after the terrorist strike on Paris. Elian Peltier from the New York Times suggested that "the charged atmosphere after the attacks added tension to the installations".
- Come Hell or High Water. The artist semi-submerged a fleet of cars in the Tyne for the World Summit of Arts and Culture.
- Lost 0. The artist used reclaimed street signs to build a monument to the lost ring road in Ashford as part of the largest Shared space Scheme in Europe. The sculpture was featured extensively in the press. According to the prominent art historian Richard Cork, the sculpture was “powerful and resonant." He further remarked that Pinsky “thrives in his art on giving subversive new meanings to objects he discovers on site". Jeremy Clarkson, a prominent opponent to the scheme, predicted there would be a "Jaguar dance of death", however studies demonstrated that there was in fact a 41% drop in road accidents due to the scheme. He later admitted "he got it wrong".
- Pontis. The artist created bilingual Latin and English signs in Wallsend Metro station. This project was shortlisted for the Gulbenkian Prize for Museums.

== Awards ==
Pinsky has received awards from the RSA, Arts Council England, British Council, Arts and Business, the Wellcome Trust and his exhibition Pontis was shortlisted for the prestigious Gulbenkian Museums Award.
