= Chao Xu (rapist) =

UK-convicted Chinese serial rapist (born 1992)

- Xu in 2025 following his arrest by the Metropolitan Police
- Born: 1992 (age 33–34); China
- Education: University of Greenwich
- Convictions: Rape (4 counts); Voyeurism (4 counts); Assault by penetration (8 counts); Sexual assault (4 counts); Attempted drugging (2 counts); Upskirt filming (2 counts)
- Penalty: Life imprisonment (minimum term 14 years)

Details
- Victims: At least 6
- Span of crimes: 2021–2025

Chao Xu
- Simplified Chinese: 许超
- Traditional Chinese: 許超
Transcriptions
Standard Mandarin
- Hanyu Pinyin: Xǔ Chāo

Chao Xu (born 1992) is a Chinese convicted serial sex offender who committed multiple rapes, drug-facilitated sexual assaults, voyeurism offences and covert recordings of women in London, between 2021 and 2025. In 2025, after being apprehended by the police, he pleaded guilty to 24 sexual offences committed against six women and was sentenced to life imprisonment with a minimum term of 14 years. The Metropolitan Police believe Xu may have victimised hundreds of women, describing him as "one of the most prolific sexual predators" they have investigated.

== Background ==
Xu was born in 1992 in China. He moved to the United Kingdom in 2016 and later obtained a master's degree in international law from the University of Greenwich. After completing his studies, he obtained a UK work visa and established a recruitment company in London. His business primarily assisted recently graduated Chinese students in securing employment in the United Kingdom. According to investigators, his principal targets were Chinese women aged between 18 and 30. During sentencing, the trial judge described Xu as a calculating sexual predator who carefully cultivated the trust of women before attacking them. The judge stated that Xu derived "considerable pleasure" from his offences and characterised his conduct as meticulously planned.

== Arrest and investigation ==
Xu's offences came to light after a social gathering held at his Greenwich residence in May 2025. One victim, who had been drugged and sexually assaulted, became suspicious that she had been secretly recorded after regaining intermittent consciousness. She demanded that Xu surrender his mobile phone, but he refused, stating that he would only hand it over to police. The victim immediately contacted the authorities. Police examined Xu's phone and discovered numerous recordings of sexual assaults and covert voyeuristic footage, resulting in arrest on 1 June 2025. Following Xu's arrest, police recovered extensive digital evidence from his electronic devices, including first-person recordings of sexual assaults. Investigators identified videos depicting sexual violence against at least eleven unidentified women. Analysis of the videos on his device also showed that he attacked one woman in China before moving to the UK.

According to the police investigation, Xu's offending continued for at least three years, from November 2021 until June 2025. He frequently hosted networking events and social gatherings at his London residences, including at his Greenwich property. Guests, whom he targeted, were offered a homemade alcoholic cocktail known as "The Spirit of Life", which Xu prepared using alcohol and Chinese herbal ingredients, and then spiked with stupefying drugs, leading them to fall unconscious and then for Xu to rape them. Investigators found that Xu secretly added sedative substances—including gamma-hydroxybutyrate (GHB), commonly known as a "date rape drug", and muscle relaxants containing scopolamine to drinks served to selected women. The drugs rendered victims unconscious or severely incapacitated, preventing them from resisting the assaults. One victim testified that although she remained mentally aware after being drugged, she was unable to move, speak or open her eyes while she was being sexually assaulted.

Xu also installed numerous hidden cameras throughout his residence, disguising them inside everyday household objects such as air fresheners, speakers, digital clocks and feminine hygiene product packaging. The hidden cameras recorded women showering, using toilets and being sexually assaulted while unconscious or incapacitated. Police also discovered that Xu had compiled edited videos of the assaults for his own viewing. Investigators further found evidence that Xu secretly filmed women underneath their skirts on London's public transport network, including at London Bridge Underground station.

== Guilty plea and sentencing ==
In August 2025, Xu pleaded guilty at Woolwich Crown Court to 24 offences involving six women, comprising four counts of rape, eight counts of assault by penetration, four counts of sexual assault, four counts of voyeurism, two counts of administering a substance with intent to commit a sexual offence and two counts of upskirt filming. On 14 November 2025, Judge Christopher Greet sentenced Xu to life imprisonment with a minimum custodial sentence of 14 years.

During sentencing, the judge described Xu as "an extremely dangerous man" who had abused the trust of women in "the worst possible way". As Xu is a Chinese national, the court stated that the Home Office would determine whether deportation to China should be considered following completion of his custodial sentence.

== Reactions to Xu's case ==
Following Xu's conviction, the Metropolitan Police continued examining his electronic devices, which contained more than six million WeChat messages in Chinese, along with thousands of photographs and videos. Police believe Xu's total number of victims, both in the United Kingdom and in China, could reach several hundred. After authorities publicly appealed for information, at least eleven additional women contacted police. Acting Detective Superintendent Lewis Sanderson of the Metropolitan Police described Xu as "one of the most prolific sex offenders of all time."

Investigators established a dedicated reporting channel and urged anyone who may have encountered Xu, regardless of nationality or ethnicity, to come forward. Police compared aspects of Xu's offending with those of Chinese doctoral student Zhenhao Zou, who was convicted of unrelated drug-facilitated sexual offences in the United Kingdom. However, investigators stated that there was no evidence linking the two cases.

== See also ==
- List of serial rapists
- Reynhard Sinaga
- Sexual offences in the United Kingdom
