= He Ying (revolutionary) =

Chinese revolutionary (1886–1933)

- 贺英
- Portrait of He Ying
- Born: He Mingying (贺明英); 14 April 1886; Sangzhi, Hunan, Qing China
- Died: 5 May 1933 (aged 47) between Hunan and Hubei, China
- Other name: He Xianggu
- Occupation: Revolutionary
- Spouse: Gu Jiting (m. 1906–1922)
- Relatives: He Long (brother); He Mangu (sister)

He Mingying (14 April 1886 - 5 May 1933) commonly known as He Ying (Chinese: 贺英) was a Chinese revolutionary who played a role in supporting the Chinese Communist movement in the early 20th century.

== Early life ==
He Ying was born in the Sangzhi, Hunan to a family of Tujia ethnicity. She was the elder sister of He Long, the Marshal of the People's Republic of China. Her other siblings included He Wumei and He Mangu. Raised in poverty, with a mother long bedridden, she shouldered the responsibility of managing the household and caring for her six siblings. She trained in martial arts from a young age.

== Revolutionary career ==
In 1906, she married Gu Hu (also known as Gu Jiting), a local leader of the Gelaohui. She joined her husband in organizing local militias to resist feudal oppression, influenced by Gu Zhuangyou, a veteran of the 1911 Revolution. Together, they gathered arms and fought against local reactionary forces.

In 1916, her journey as a revolutionary began when her younger brother He Long, then aged 20, killed a local government tax assessor who had killed his uncle for defaulting on his taxes. She and her husband supported He Long’s “Two Kitchen Knives Revolution”, an uprising against local landlords in Sangzhi. They assassinated landlord Zhu Haishan and expelled the county magistrate, marking the start of their armed resistance.

In 1920, her father and youngest brother, He Wenzheng, were killed by reactionary forces. In 1922, her husband was also murdered while serving as commander of the Lizhou Second Guerrilla Brigade. Undeterred, He Ying assumed leadership of the armed group, styling herself as commander and continuing the fight across Hunan and Hubei. By 1925, as He Long’s forces moved toward eastern Guizhou, He Ying remained in Sangzhi as the “rear guard commander”, leading resistance against the Hunan warlords. In 1926, she mobilized local militias to capture Sangzhi County, ousting the local magistrate and garrison commander and on the same year, she united her local troops with He Long's troops during the Northern Expedition.

In 1927, influenced by the workers’ and peasants’ movements and her brother He Long, then a commander in the National Revolutionary Army, He Ying’s ideology shifted to revolutionary ideals. After the failure of the Autumn Harvest Uprising, she returned to Sangzhi, securing funds from He Long to arm her forces. Leading as guerrilla commander, she expanded her ranks. In October 1927, after Kuomintang forces targeted Hongjiaguan to crush He Long’s base, He Ying led 600 fighters in an uprising organized by the Communist Party’s Xiangxi Special Committee, briefly capturing Sangzhi County. In 1928, she transferred her nearly 1000-strong militia to He Long, joining the Workers’ and Peasants’ Revolutionary Army and contributing to the establishment of the Xiang-E Western Revolutionary Base. Despite setbacks, including the capture and execution of her younger sister He Mangu by Kuomintang, He Ying continued to lead guerrilla operations and adopted He Mangu's son Xiang Xuan. She continued in providing critical support to He Long’s forces by securing supplies and mobilizing local networks. In 1930, He Ying’s guerrilla unit protected Red Army wounded and families in the Sangzhi-Hefeng border region while managing military operations in the Hefeng Soviet. She played a key role in defeating rebel forces and reorganizing defecting militias, strengthening the Red Second Army Group.

By 1932, the revolutionary base faced relentless encirclement by Kuomintang forces. He Ying’s guerrilla unit, isolated in the high mountains, persevered under dire conditions and bolstered by local support. In January 1933, she reunited with the Red Third Army. However, in May 1933, betrayed by a traitor, her guerrilla base was surrounded by Kuomintang forces. In the ensuing battle, He Ying was killed at the age of 47.

== Legacy ==
After the founding of the People's Republic of China in 1949, He Ying's remains were recovered and are buried at the Martyrs' Cemetery in Sangzhi County.

In September 2009, He Ying was named one of the '100 heroes and role models who contributed to the founding of New China'.

== Bibliography ==
- Leung, Edward Pak-wah. Historical Dictionary of the Chinese Civil War. United States of America: Scarecrow Press. 2002. ISBN 0-8108-4435-4.
