= Yu Huaying =

Chinese child trafficker (1963–2025)

- 余华英
- Born: 29 December 1963; Heqing County, Yunnan, China
- Died: 28 February 2025 (aged 61); Guizhou, China
- Cause of death: Execution by shooting or lethal injection
- Status: Executed
- Conviction: Human trafficking (17 counts)
- Penalty: Death

Details
- Victims: 17
- Date: 1993–2003
- Locations: Multiple regions in China, including Guizhou, Chongqing, and Yunnan

External videos
- Bilibili）

Yu Huaying (余华英 Yú Huáyīng; 29 December 1963 – 28 February 2025) was a Chinese child trafficker who abducted a total of 17 children between 1993 and 2003. Yu had committed these crimes in multiple regions like Guizhou, Chongqing, and Yunnan. Yu was arrested in 2022, after one of the victims reported her ordeal to the police, thus bringing the offences to light. Yu was found guilty of trafficking 11 children and sentenced to death in September 2023, although her case was subsequently remitted for a re-trial due to the revelation of more victims, and the re-trial ended with Yu once again sentenced to death in October 2024. Yu's appeal was dismissed, and she was executed on 28 February 2025.

== Background and crimes ==
=== Early life ===
Yu Huaying was born as the fourth child in her family in Heqing County, Yunnan, China, on 29 December 1963. Yu only studied up to her second year in elementary school before she dropped out due to her mother's death and turned to farming. Yu's father died when she was 17. In 1984, at the age of 21, Yu met a man named Wang Jiawen (王加文 Wáng Jiāwén; born 28 June 1958; alias Wang Wei 王伟) from Dazu, Chongqing, while traveling in Dali. The two later married, and together, they had a daughter born in January 1987. The couple, however, were not hardworking, and Wang himself was often involved in petty crimes. Subsequently, in 1992, Wang was arrested for theft, leaving Yu and her daughter without support. Yu sent her daughter to live with relatives and began working at a noodle shop in the county seat to make ends meet. During that period, Yu began an affair with another man named Gong Xianliang (龚显良 Gōng Xiǎnliáng; died August 2008), and she gave birth in 1993 to Gong's child, a son, out of wedlock.

=== Child trafficking crimes ===
After the birth of their son, Yu and Gong continued to experience financial struggles, and as a result, the couple sold the boy to a middleman in Hebei for 5,000 yuan. This marked the beginning of Yu's involvement in child trafficking. Between 1993 and 2003, Yu trafficked a total of 17 children (with her son being the first victim), often with the modus operandi of luring them with treats and games, and the first few victims were neighbouring children before the criminal operations were expanded to avoid exposure to authorities. Throughout the decade itself, Yu had abducted at least 11 of the victims with the help of Gong and the same middleman, Wang Guofu (王国付 Wáng Guófù), and after taking them from various regions like Yunnan, Chongqing, and Guizhou, Yu and her accomplices would bring them to Handan, Hebei, where the children were ultimately sold. Yu's husband, Wang Jiawen, also took part in the crimes after he was released from prison. Based on the investigation, a total of 12 families fell victim to Yu's child trafficking operations. Among them, five families each lost two children who were siblings.

One of the victims was identified as Yang Niuhua (杨妞花 Yáng Nĭuhuā; born 29 April 1990), a girl of Miao descent who was five years old when she was abducted by Yu (who was also Yang's neighbour) from Guizhou to Handan in 1995. Yang, who had an older sister, was subsequently sold to an elderly woman (surnamed Wang) with a deaf-mute adult son (surnamed Li) for the price of 3,000 yuan, and she was renamed Li Suyan (李素燕 Lĭ Sùyàn) after her adoption. According to reports, Yang described her foster father as a kind man who treated her well but also unaware that she was sold to his mother (who bought Yang to help take care of her son), and they both shared a close relationship. Eight years after she was adopted, Yang left school at the age of 13 and began working in factories as an underage migrant laborer. She married in 2009 and has three children with her husband. Yang was only reunited with her biological family in 2021.

Another victim, identified as Li Cong (李聪 Lǐ Cōng; born 22 December 1997), was abducted in 2002 at the age of four. Li, who was born in Dali, Yunnan, to parents who originated from Sichuan, was entrusted to the care of his father's aunt while his parents went to work on the ninth day of the Lunar New Year. However, around lunchtime, Li's mother called him for lunch but discovered that he had gone missing; Li was reportedly last seen walking with Wang Jiawen by a relative, but Wang, who abducted and sold off the boy together with Yu, denied any wrongdoing when he was first arrested, before he was released due to lack of evidence. Li was reunited with his mother in early 2024 after he underwent a police DNA test with his mother.

A third victim, who went by the alias Chen Jianghai (谌江海 Chén Jiānghǎi), was abducted alongside his brother in 1993, after Yu lured the two boys to go to a games arcade. Although Chen's brother was eventually found by their parents (partly because Yu felt the boy was too old to fetch a good price), Chen was ultimately taken away and sold off by Yu for a price of between 3,500 yuan and 4,500 yuan, and after more than 30 years, Chen reunited with his parents in 2024 after a successful DNA test. A fourth victim, identified as Ren Peng (任彭 Rén Péng), was abducted in 1994, and he was reunited with his mother in 2023.

=== Early convictions ===
In 2000, Yu was arrested in Handan for the first time for her criminal activities, although the full magnitude of her crimes was not revealed at this point. She was detained for two months on child abduction offenses before being released, and she resumed her criminal activities thereafter. In 2004, Yu and Wang were arrested in Handan for trafficking children a second time. She was convicted under the alias "Zhang Yun" (张芸 Zhāng Yún), and on 27 September 2004, Yu was sentenced to eight years in prison by a court in Dayao County, Yunnan. She was released early on 10 May 2009 after a three-year reduction of her sentence.

== Arrest, trial, and sentencing ==
After reaching adulthood, Yang Niuhua — one of the 17 children abducted by Yu Huaying — began searching for her biological family. Though she had been taken at a young age, she retained faint memories of her early childhood, including her birth name, "Yang Niuhua," before she was adopted and renamed Li Suyan. Yang eventually reconnected with her biological elder sister Yang Sangying (杨桑英 Yáng Sāngyīng) through the social media platform Douyin in April 2021, and Yang reunited with her biological family thereafter. However, at that point, Yang's birth parents were no longer alive. Her biological father turned to alcohol and died of an illness in 1997, and her biological mother died in 1998, reportedly from depression and grief over the loss of their younger daughter, leaving Yang's older sister orphaned and under the care of their maternal grandmother.

Subsequently, after her reunion with her biological kin, Yang filed a police report, and as a result, Yu Huaying was arrested in June 2022, 27 years after she first kidnapped and sold Yang. At the time of Yu's arrest, her lover Gong Xianliang had since died in August 2008 of an illness and thus could not be prosecuted, while Yu's husband Wang Jiawen remained on the run and was not caught until September 2023. After her arrest in Chongqing, the criminal operations of Yu finally came to light upon investigations, and Yu was charged with multiple counts of human trafficking in February 2023.

On 14 July 2023, Yu Huaying stood trial before the Guiyang Intermediate People's Court. At the time, investigations had uncovered evidence linking her to the trafficking of 11 children, including Yang Niuhua. However, the full extent of her crimes had yet to be fully revealed. The prosecution sought the death penalty for Yu during the trial, and Yang reportedly asked the court to impose a harsh punishment for Yu, noting that Yu did not show any remorse and remained unapologetic for her crimes.

On 18 September 2023, 59-year-old Yu Huaying was found guilty of trafficking 11 children by the Guiyang Intermediate People's Court. Yu was sentenced to death, permanently deprived of all political rights for life, and had all her personal property confiscated. In their verdict, the court found that the circumstances of Yu's offences were "particularly severe" and her actions had caused "extremely significant" social harm due to the large number of victims and its impact on the society, and hence, the court found it appropriate to impose the death penalty for Yu.

== Re-trial and appeals ==
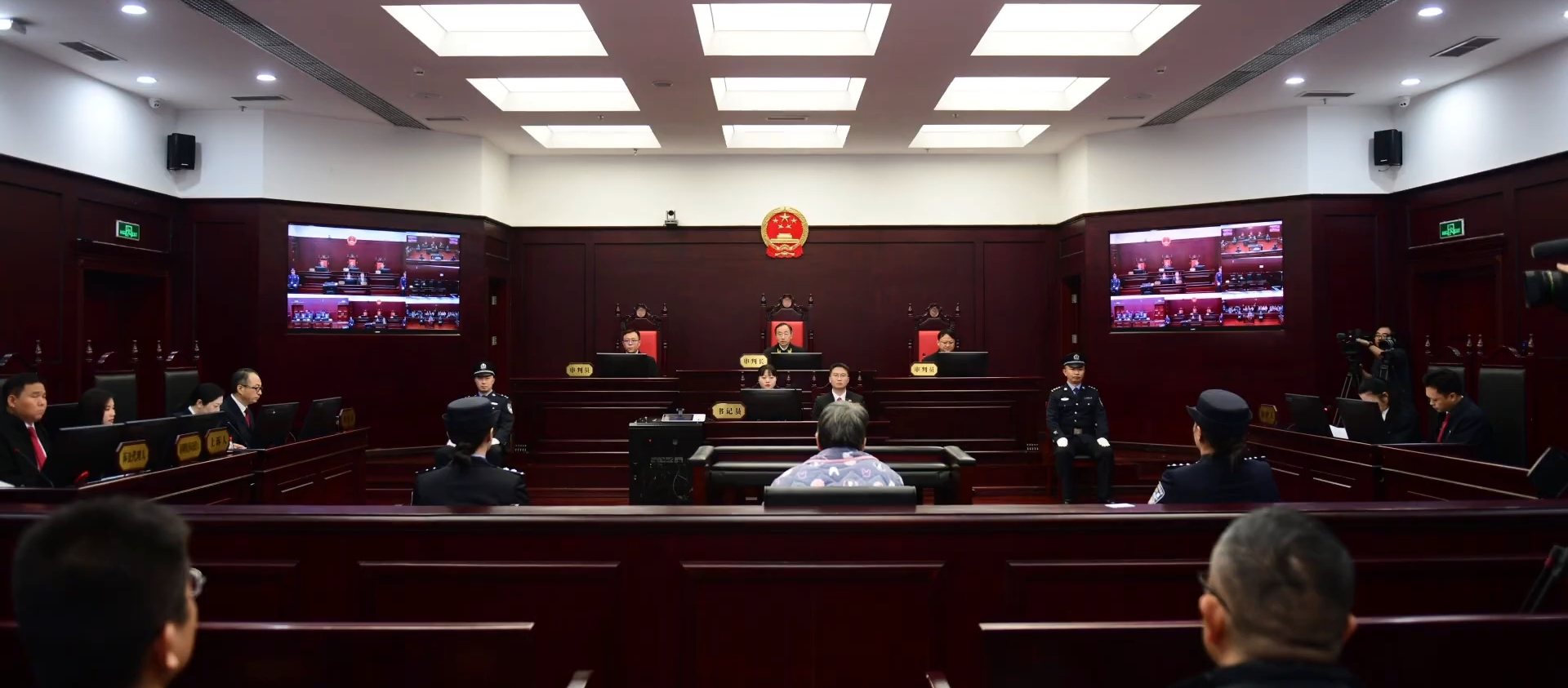
Yu Huaying (middle, with her back turned) attending her appeal hearing at the High People's Court of Guizhou Province on 28 November 2023.

After she was sentenced to death, Yu Huaying filed an appeal in November 2023. On 8 January 2024, the High People's Court of Guizhou Province allowed Yu's appeal and ordered a re-trial, after finding that there were incomplete facts of Yu's criminal activities, which warranted a re-trial for the defendant before deciding if she should face capital punishment.

On 11 October 2024, the re-trial of Yu began at the Guiyang Intermediate People's Court. This time, the number of charges against Yu increased after the authorities discovered the evidence of additional victims in Yu's child trafficking crimes, therefore bringing the initial count of 11 to 17 victims in total. A legal expert revealed that the re-trial was necessary to bring additional justice to the other six victims and their families after they were recently discovered and linked to Yu.

On 25 October 2024, Yu was once again sentenced to death by the Guiyang Intermediate People's Court, and the court also stripped Yu of all political rights for life and ordered the confiscation of all her property. In explaining their reasons to reinstate the death sentence, the court highlighted the grave nature of Yu's crimes and their devastating impact on the victims' families—some of whom had died from depression or spent years searching for their missing children. The court emphasized that, in her pursuit of illegal profit, Yu was responsible for the separation of 12 families and the destruction of family bonds. The court quoted:

"Yu Huaying's subjective malice is extremely deep, her criminal behavior is particularly heinous, and the consequences of her actions are severe, warranting harsh punishment. Although she confessed, this is insufficient to justify a lighter sentence."

Meanwhile, Wang Jiawen, Yu's husband, pleaded guilty in September 2024 to charges of child trafficking and escape, was sentenced to 16 1/2 years' imprisonment on the same day when Yu was condemned to death row a second time.

After the end of her re-trial, Yu once again appealed the death sentence. On 19 December 2024, the Guizhou Provincial High People's Court dismissed Yu's appeal against the death sentence. The High People's Court duly considered that Yu had engaged in unlawful trafficking of children for her own profit, and her actions had caused irreparable harm to the families of the abducted children – whether emotionally or physically – and violated the children's right to personal dignity and freedom.

According to reports, this was Yu's final appeal, and the case was forwarded to the Supreme People's Court, the highest court in China, for additional review.

== Execution ==
On 28 February 2025, 61-year-old Yu Huaying was put to death by the Guiyang Intermediate People's Court in Guizhou after the Supreme People's Court approved her death sentence.

In response to the execution of Yu, Yang Niuhua expressed that justice had been served, and a few days after Yu's execution, Yang and her sister went to the graves of their parents to pay respects.

== See also ==
- Capital punishment in China
