= Zhenhao Zou =

Chinese convicted serial rapist in the UK (born 1997)

- Zou no later than 2025
- Born: 20 February 1997 (age 29); Dongguan, Guangdong, China
- Education: Guangdong University of Technology; Queen's University Belfast; University College London
- Convictions: Rape, voyeurism, possession of extreme pornography, false imprisonment and possession of controlled drugs with the intent to commit sexual offenses
- Penalty: Life imprisonment (minimum term 24 years)

Details
- Victims: 10
- Span of crimes: 2019–2024

Zhenhao Zou
- Simplified Chinese: 邹镇豪
- Traditional Chinese: 鄒鎮豪
Transcriptions
Standard Mandarin
- Hanyu Pinyin: Zōu Zhènháo
- Wade–Giles: Tsou1 Chen4-hao2
Yue: Cantonese
- Jyutping: Zau1 Zan3-hou4

Zhenhao Zou (born 20 February 1997) is a Chinese serial rapist who was convicted of drugging and raping 10 women in London, where he was living as a PhD student at University College London, and in China. He was apprehended on 24 January 2024 and sentenced to life imprisonment on 19 June 2025, with a minimum term of 24 years before he would be eligible for parole.

Zou met his victims, all of Chinese heritage, through social media and dating apps, inviting them to his flat on the pretense of socialising before drugging and assaulting them. Police believe the true number of victims may be as high as 50 to 60. Metropolitan Police Commander Kevin Southworth described Zou as "one of the most prolific sexual predators we have seen in this country [United Kingdom]."

== Background ==
Zou was born on 12 February 1997 in Dongguan, Guangdong, China. His father worked at a state-owned enterprise as a director and Chinese Communist Party committee member of a company related to the Dongguan Songshan Lake High-Tech Industrial Development Zone, while his mother was a teacher. According to interviews conducted by journalists, people who knew Zou, including those who had known him since childhood, unanimously believed that he had serious personality problems. He was described as a "severe sex addict", someone whose "phone was full of photos of girls" and a person who frequently boasted about his sexual abilities. They also revealed that Zou had asked classmates who were doctors in China to prescribe sleeping pills for him, and had even requested patients' contact information from classmates so he could buy medication directly from the patients.

Zou previously studied at Guangdong University of Technology. In 2017, he moved to the United Kingdom to study mechanical engineering at Queen's University Belfast in Northern Ireland. In September 2019, he enrolled at University College London for a master's degree in mechanical engineering and returned to China during the COVID-19 pandemic in the UK. He later continued pursuing a PhD at University College London.

During his time in the UK, Zou lived a luxurious lifestyle, residing in student accommodation in central London and later in a high-end apartment in Elephant and Castle. An advertisement he posted on a rental website specifically requested an apartment with good soundproofing. He actively participated in social activities, including visiting nightclubs and hosting parties, and spent large sums on designer clothing and cosmetic surgery procedures, including hair transplants, eyelid surgery, chin reshaping and dental correction.

== Arrest and investigation ==
Zou's criminal behaviour first came to police attention in May 2023, when a woman reported being raped at her apartment. The case was initially set aside due to translation difficulties and the complainant's decision not to pursue it, a handling that later drew criticism. In the days that followed, she posted warnings on Chinese social media about Zou, and her posts were seen by another woman who came forward to say she too had been sexually assaulted after meeting him. In November 2023, a further rape was reported and police launched a formal investigation. In the same year, following the complaints, Zou returned to China before going back to the UK in January 2024. On 24 January 2024, the Metropolitan Police arrested him at his London apartment. In February 2024, the police came across an account of the assault on social media and contacted the woman directly. She described being invited to Zou's apartment under the pretense of drinks, where she was forced to consume alcohol, prevented from leaving and ultimately raped. In the same month, police seized a large number of videos and electronic devices at Zou's residence, confirming that he had sexually assaulted multiple women. A search of Zou's home yielded a substantial body of evidence: straws, glass bottles and a 500 ml container of 1,4-butanediol, as well as a range of illegal substances including ketamine and MDMA. Officers also recovered hidden cameras and numerous electronic devices, including laptops and mobile phones.

Forensic analysis of seized electronic devices of Zou revealed 1,270 video recordings with a combined running time of over 1,660 hours, 58 of which documented rape, alongside approximately nine million WeChat messages. Investigators had to generate a custom-written computer code to examine the material. It also emerged that Zou had downloaded a guide on how to drug women as early as November 2020; material recovered from his phone included an advertisement featuring photographs of naked women who appeared to be asleep, captioned with the phrase "guaranteed results". Further items found at his flat included victims' underwear, lipstick and Chanel earrings, which were personal possessions of the victims that Zou appeared to have kept as trophies.

The investigation established that Zou had carried out similar offences in China as well as in the United Kingdom. The footage retrieved from Zou showed a large number of unidentified victims, and police believe the total may be as high as 50 to 60, all of Chinese heritage. The women filmed appeared unconscious and incapable of giving consent, and some recordings did not show their faces. Investigators found that Zou operated under the online alias "Pakho" and routinely approached women through platforms such as WeChat, Red Note and the dating app Bumble, inviting them to his flat on the pretense of studying or socialising. Once there, he would drug their drinks, wait for them to lose consciousness, and assault them, with hidden cameras placed around the room recording everything.

The footage showed victims rendered unable to resist by the drugs, their speech slurred, with some appearing visibly distressed. In one recording, Zou stares directly into the camera while his victim, with visible bruising around her left eye and cheekbone can be seen in the background. The audio, in Mandarin, captures him dismissing her pleas outright and in one instance mocking a victim as she cried out during the assault. Given the covert nature of Zou's methods, police believe a significant number of victims remain unidentified. The Metropolitan Police launched an international appeal encouraging anyone who may have been affected to come forward. Metropolitan Police Commander Kevin Southworth described Zou as "particularly cowardly and cunning", adding that "these offences are so insidious—I think there may be further victims who don't even realise they have actually been raped". During the investigation, the Metropolitan Police received assistance from China's Ministry of Public Security, which facilitated one victim giving evidence remotely by video link.

== Trial ==
Zou's trial opened at the Inner London Crown Court in January 2025. He faced 11 counts of rape, three counts of voyeurism, 12 counts of possessing extreme pornographic images, one count of false imprisonment and eight counts of possessing controlled drugs with intent to commit a sexual offence, two of the rape charges relating to the same victim. During proceedings, the jury was shown extensive footage of the attacks Zou had recorded himself. The presiding judge, Circuit Judge Rosina Cottage KC, noted that viewing the material had been "extremely distressing" and had moved observers to tears. Zou pleaded not guilty to all charges. In his defence, he claimed to have received a strict upbringing in China with no sex education. He told the court he had a particular interest in 'time-stop pornography', and said he suffered from insomnia and was "interested in sexual activity during sleep". He maintained that the women in the recordings had consented to what he described as role play and that the 1,4-butanediol found at his flat was used to make moisturiser. Police, however, found no evidence whatsoever among the seized material to support his claim of an interest in 'time-stop pornography'.

One identified victim testified that on 18 May 2023, after a drinks gathering at Zou's flat in Elephant and Castle, she was pressured into drinking vodka until she felt drunk and out of control. She pleaded with a female friend of Zou's to help her get home, but Zou persuaded the friend to leave, insisting he could not send a drunk woman home alone. He kept her in the flat and raped her. When she woke the following morning, she searched for her underwear and eventually found it in his wardrobe. She later posted about her experience on Red Note and WeChat. A second identified victim testified that, having previously had consensual sex with Zou on one occasion, she met him again in September 2021 for drinks at a Haidilao restaurant in London's Chinatown. Her last clear memory was of vomiting in the street and losing her bank card. She woke to find Zou raping her.

On 5 March 2025, the jury found Zou guilty of all 11 counts of rape, three counts of voyeurism, ten counts of possessing extreme pornographic images, one count of false imprisonment and three counts of possessing controlled drugs with intent to commit a sexual offence. He was acquitted on two counts of possessing extreme pornographic images and five counts of possessing controlled drugs with intent. Judge Cottage described Zou as a "dangerous and predatory" offender and indicated he would face a "very lengthy" sentence when he returned to court for sentencing on 19 June.

=== Sentencing ===
On 19 June 2025, Zou was sentenced to life imprisonment with a minimum term of 24 years before he could be considered for parole. Judge Cottage observed that Zou, despite being a "very intelligent young man", had concealed his true nature as a sexual predator behind a charming exterior. She described his conduct as premeditated and systematic, noting that he had treated his victims "remorselessly" as objects for his own gratification, causing them harm that was "profound and destructive". The judge concluded that Zou was a highly manipulative and intelligent individual who had "no genuine understanding of consent whatsoever". She determined that, given his deeply entrenched patterns of thinking and behavior, he posed a "continuing and significant danger to the public" and remained at serious risk of reoffending for the foreseeable future. It was reported that even after his minimum term expires, Zou may never be released if the Parole Board considers him to still pose a risk. Prior to sentencing, Zou requested an offer to be chemically castrated in order to receive a lighter prison sentence but was not accepted, in recognition of the harm he caused.

Following his sentencing, police and prosecutors began preparing for Zou's second trial after at least 24 women came forward to contact police.

== Reactions to Zou's case ==
Kevin Southworth described Zou as "one of the most prolific sexual predators we have seen in this country" and "is clearly a depraved and cowardly individual who preyed on his victims in the most despicable way." Prosecutor Catherine Farrelly said that while Zou had presented himself as "an intelligent and charming young man", he was in reality "a serial sex offender, voyeur and rapist", adding that he was "a wolf in sheep's clothing and every woman's nightmare."

University College London confirmed that Zou had been suspended on 27 January 2024 following the allegations against him. UCL President and Provost Michael Spence said: "We are appalled by these terrible crimes. Our hearts are with the survivors, and we want to pay tribute to the bravery of the women who reported these offences and gave evidence at trial."

Zou's case attracted widespread attention and outrage on the Chinese social media platform Weibo. Many users called for severe punishment and questioned why Chinese media had pixelated his face in their coverage. Some expressed a desire to see him remain imprisoned permanently and never return to China. Similar sentiments were echoed on Red Note.

The Guardian sought comment from the Chinese Embassy in London regarding the case, but received no response.

== See also ==
- List of serial rapists
- Reynhard Sinaga
- Chao Xu (rapist)
