= Wang Yousheng (engineer) =

Chinese engineer (1928–2025)

- 汪槱生
- Born: 27 August 1928; Hangzhou, Zhejiang, China
- Died: 4 August 2025 (aged 96); Hangzhou, Zhejiang, China
- Education: Zhejiang University
- Scientific career
- Fields: Power electronics and control equipment
- Workplaces: Zhejiang University

Wang Yousheng (Chinese: 汪槱生; pinyin: Wāng Yǒushēng; 27 August 1928 – 4 August 2025) was a Chinese engineer who was a professor at Zhejiang University and an academician of the Chinese Academy of Engineering. He was a representative of the 12th National Congress of the Chinese Communist Party. He was a delegate to the 2nd and 3rd National People's Congress.

== Life and career ==
Wang was born in Hangzhou, Zhejiang on 27 August 1928. In 1950 he graduated from Zhejiang University and stayed for teaching. He joined the Chinese Communist Party (CCP) in April 1956.

In 1958, Wang participated in the research of the internationally pioneering dual water internal cooling technology for electric motors. In 1972, he led the establishment of China's first specialized course focused on power electronics technology at Zhejiang University. He was a professor and doctoral supervisor at the Zhejiang University, and later the director of the Technical Committee of the National Engineering Research Center for Power Electronics Application Technology.

In 1994, he was elected as one of the first academicians of the Chinese Academy of Engineering.

On 4 August 2025, Wang died in Hangzhou, Zhejiang, at the age of 96.

== Works ==
- 《电力电子技术》 [Power Electronic Technology] (in Chinese). Beijing: Science Press. 2006. ISBN 9787030168733.

== Honours and awards ==
- 1958 State Technological Invention Award (First Class) and State Science and Technology Progress Award (First Class) for research on Dual Water Internal Cooling Motor
- 1994 Member of the Chinese Academy of Engineering (CAE)
