= List of exports of France =

Exports of France by product category (2019) Chemical products Transportation Machines Mineral products Plastics and rubbers Metals Foodstuffs Precious metals Textiles Instruments Animal products Vegetable products Paper goods Footwear and headwear Miscellaneous Stone and glass Wood products Animal and vegetable bi-products Animal hides Arts and antiques Weapons

The following is a list of the exports of France. Data is for 2019, in millions of United States dollars, as reported by International Trade Centre. Currently the top thirty exports are listed.

#	Product	Value
1	Aircraft, helicopters, and spacecraft	43,972
2	Pharmaceuticals	26,164
3	Cars	23,598
4	Gas turbines	18,875
5	Vehicle parts	13,932
6	Unspecified Commodities	12,178
7	Wine (see French wine)	10,965
8	Beauty products	9,976
9	Aircraft parts	9,424
10	Trunks and cases	8,629
11	Petroleum	8,382
12	Trucks	8,130
13	Integrated circuits	7,698
14	Human or animal blood	6,592
15	Jewellery	5,496
16	Perfume	5,395
17	Low-voltage protection equipment	4,683
18	Wheat	4,358
19	Pesticides	4,010
20	Telephones	3,985
21	Tractors	3,605
22	Medical instruments	3,530
23	Cheese	3,513
24	Petroleum Gas	3,001
25	Electricity	3,000
26	Plastic	2,930
27	Valves	2,790
28	Orthopedic devices	2,706
29	Rubber Tyres	2,694
30	Centrifuges	2,675

== See also ==
- Economy of France
- List of exports of the United Kingdom
