= Chengdu Tianfu Software Park =

Business park in Chengdu, China

Chengdu Tianfu Software Park 天府软件园 (in Chinese)
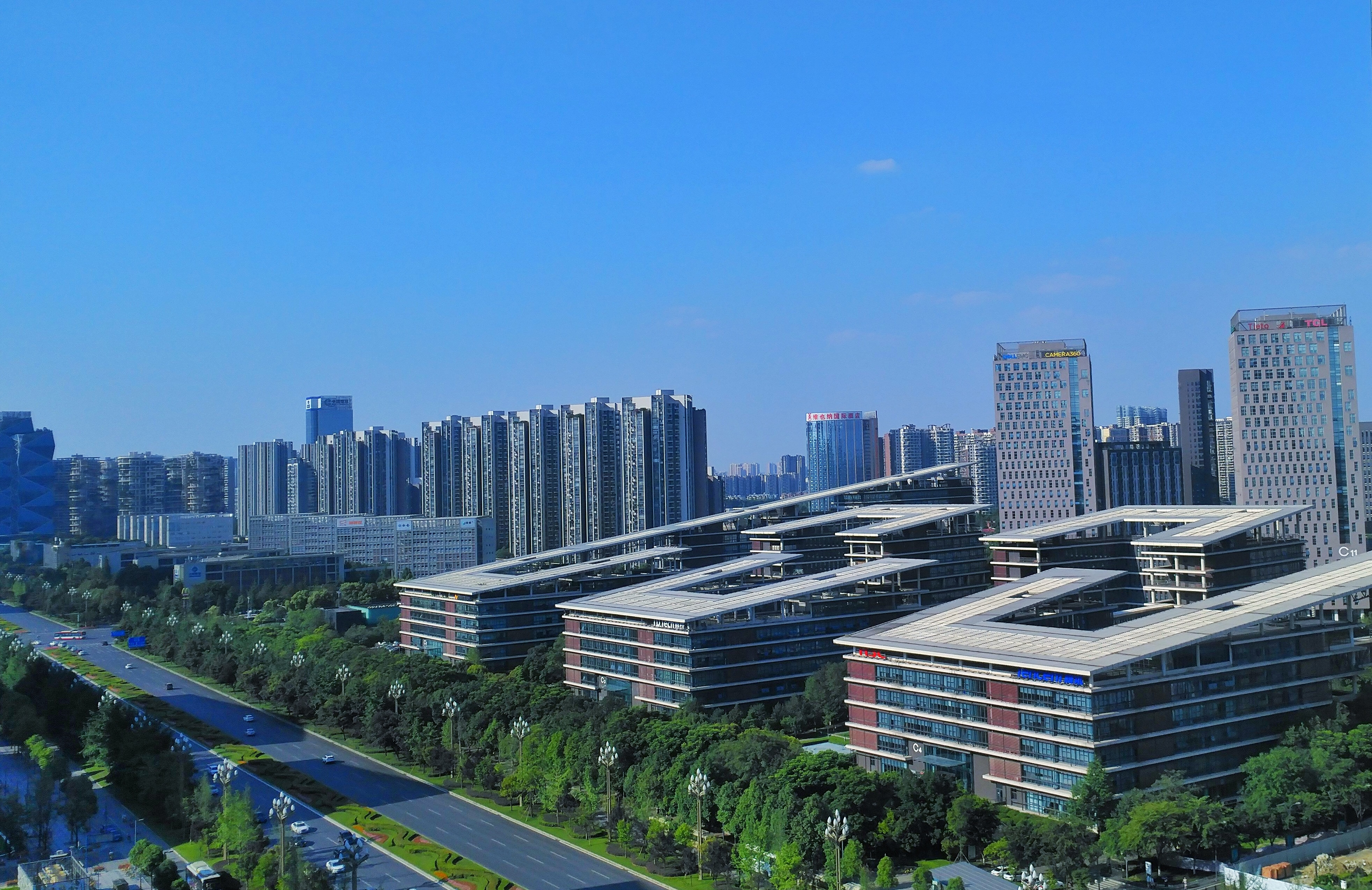
- View of the software park
- Interactive map of Chengdu Tianfu Software Park 天府软件园 (in Chinese)
- Location: Tianfu New Area, Chengdu, Sichuan, China
- Coordinates: 30.53938°N 104.05650°E
- Opening date: 2005
- Developer: Chengdu Hi-tech Investment Group Co., Ltd
- No. of tenants: 200
- Size: 2.2 million m^{2}
- Website: www.tianfusoftwarepark.com

Chengdu Tianfu Software Park (TFSP; Chinese: 天府软件园; pinyin: Tiānfǔ Ruǎnjiàn Yuán) is located in the Southern Zone of Chengdu Hi-tech Industrial Development Zone (Chengdu Hi-Tech Zone) in Sichuan, China, established in 2005.

The software park has been developed by Chengdu Hi-tech Investment Group Co., Ltd. TFSP has a total planned construction area of over 2.2 million m^{2}. The park is a base for software development and the service outsourcing industry. Chengdu Tianfu Software Park currently consists of four phases.

== Phases I and II ==
Phase I of Tianfu Software Park has a total construction area of about 230,000 m^{2}. The whole project is divided into two sections: zone A and zone B, with nine buildings in the former and eight in the latter. Building A9 accommodates various restaurants and canteens.

Phase II of Tianfu Software Park has a total land use of 760,000 m^{2} and a total construction area of 560,000 m^{2}. The whole project is divided into two sections: zone C and zone D, with twelve buildings in the former and seven in the latter. Building D1 consists of three distinctive supporting facilities: dormitories, an apartment block, and a business hotel. The underground area of zone D is dedicated to the catering needs of the area with several restaurants, two canteens and a coffee shop. Phase II was delivered in three batches: the first group of buildings in the C zone of a total construction area of 140,000 m^{2} in June 2008; the second batch in the D zone of a total construction area of 170,000 m^{2} in July 2009 and the third batch of 250,000 m^{2} in June 2010.

== Phase III ==
Phase III of Tianfu Software Park has a total construction area of 250,000 m^{2}. This project consists of two buildings and is located along Tianfu Avenue. Phase III is planned for completion at the end of the year 2011.

== Phase IV ==
Phase IV is located in the southern residential area of Chengdu Hi-tech Zone with a total construction area of 1,100,000 m^{2}. Tianfu Village is the latest project launched under the label of Tianfu Software Park and operated by Tianfu Software Park Co., Ltd.

Phase IV was specifically designed to accommodate hi-tech, BPO, e-commerce, and call-center operations, but also provides SOHO offices for smaller businesses.

== Location ==
Tianfu Software Park is located in the south part of Chengdu Hi-tech Zone and in the core area of Chengdu's new city center, also called Tianfu New City.

The Park is a 25-minutes drive to Tianfu Square (city center), a 10-minute drive to the South Railway Station, and a 15-minute drive to the Shuangliu International Airport.

Asides from many public buses stopping by Tianfu Software Park, the park operator provides 24-hour shuttle buses from the park to the South Railway Station. The first line of the subway system has been operational since October 2010 and will have its terminal station located 100 meters away from the software park.

The journey from the park to Tianfu Square (in the city center) by subway has been reduced to 20 minutes.

== Partners ==
Since Tianfu Software Park was launched in 2005, it has attracted a large number of enterprises segmented in six sectors: ITO/software development, digital entertainment, information security, telecom, R&D, IC design, and BPO/shared services centers. Over 200 companies operate in the park, employing about 30,000 people.

== About Chengdu Tianfu Software Park Co., Ltd ==
Chengdu Tianfu Software Park Co., Ltd, a wholly owned subsidiary of Chengdu Hi-tech Investment Group, was founded under the leadership of the Administration Committee of Chengdu Hi-tech Zone in February 2009 to operate Tianfu Software Park.

== See also ==
- Chengdu
- Economic and Technological Development Zones
- Sichuan
- Tianfu Art Park
