= Placidus Pei Ronggui =

Chinese Catholic priest (1933–2025)

Placidus Pei Ronggui (Chinese: 裴荣贵; 1933 – 6 September 2025) was a Chinese Catholic priest and coadjutor bishop of the Diocese of Luoyang. In the 1980s, he was detained for four years for his work with the underground church, rejecting participation with the Chinese Catholic Patriotic Association.

== Biography ==
Pei was born in 1933, and was initially involved in the Legio Mariae and preached in the area around Tianjin. In 1950, he was sentenced to 15 years in prison as a "counter-revolutionary", which he served in a prison in Shijiazhuang. Later, he settled in Youtong Village, Hebei Province.

He joined the Trappist religious community and was ordained a priest in 1981. He held Mass in Youtong underground. In July 1989, he was arrested and sentenced to five years in prison for "disturbing social order". In March 1993, he was released on parole. In the following year, he was arrested several times for a short time and remained under police surveillance.

On 14 October 2003, Peter Li Hongye, Bishop of Luoyang, consecrated him Coadjutor Bishop of Luoyang. However, after a short stay in Luoyang, Ronggui was escorted to Hebei by the police and prevented from returning to Luoyang. He rejected joining the Chinese Catholic Patriotic Association, which was suggested to him. He retired in 2011.

Pei lived his last years in his home village, where he continued to hear confessions. He died on 6 September 2025, aged 92.
