= Liu Minfu =

Chinese politician (1938–2025)

Liu Minfu (刘民复; February 1938 – 17 December 2025) was a Chinese politician.

== Life and career ==
Liu Minfu was born in Hunan in February 1938. He was a member of the Revolutionary Committee of the Chinese Kuomintang, and vice chairman of the Central Committee of the Chinese Revolutionary Committee.

Liu died on 17 December 2025, at the age of 87.
