= Wang Zhengguo =

Chinese engineer (1935–2025)

- 王正国
- Born: 12 December 1935; Zhangzhou, Fujian, China
- Died: 5 January 2025 (aged 89); Shanghai, China
- Education: China Medical University
- Scientific career
- Fields: Field surgery
- Workplaces: Army Medical University

Chinese name
- Simplified Chinese: 王正国
- Traditional Chinese: 王正國
Transcriptions
Standard Mandarin
- Hanyu Pinyin: Wáng Zhèngguó

Wang Zhengguo (Chinese: 王正国; 12 December 1935 – 5 January 2025) was a Chinese engineer specializing in field surgery, and an academician of the Chinese Academy of Engineering.

== Early life and career ==
Wang was born in Zhangzhou, Fujian, on 12 December 1935, while his ancestral home is in Hefei, Anhui. In 1950, he enrolled at the China Medical University, where he majored in the Military Medical Department.

After university in 1956, Wang was assigned as a researcher at the Academy of Military Medical Sciences, and moved to the PLA 3rd Military Medical University (now Army Medical University) in 1963.

== Personal life and death ==
Wang married Zhu Peifang (朱佩芳). On 5 January 2024, Wang died in Shanghai at the age of 89.

== Honours and awards ==
- 1992 State Science and Technology Progress Award (First Class)
- 1995 Member of the Chinese Academy of Engineering (CAE)
- 1997 Science and Technology Progress Award of the Ho Leung Ho Lee Foundation
