= Yuanshui River =

Chinese river

Coordinates: 28°03′41″N 115°29′15″E

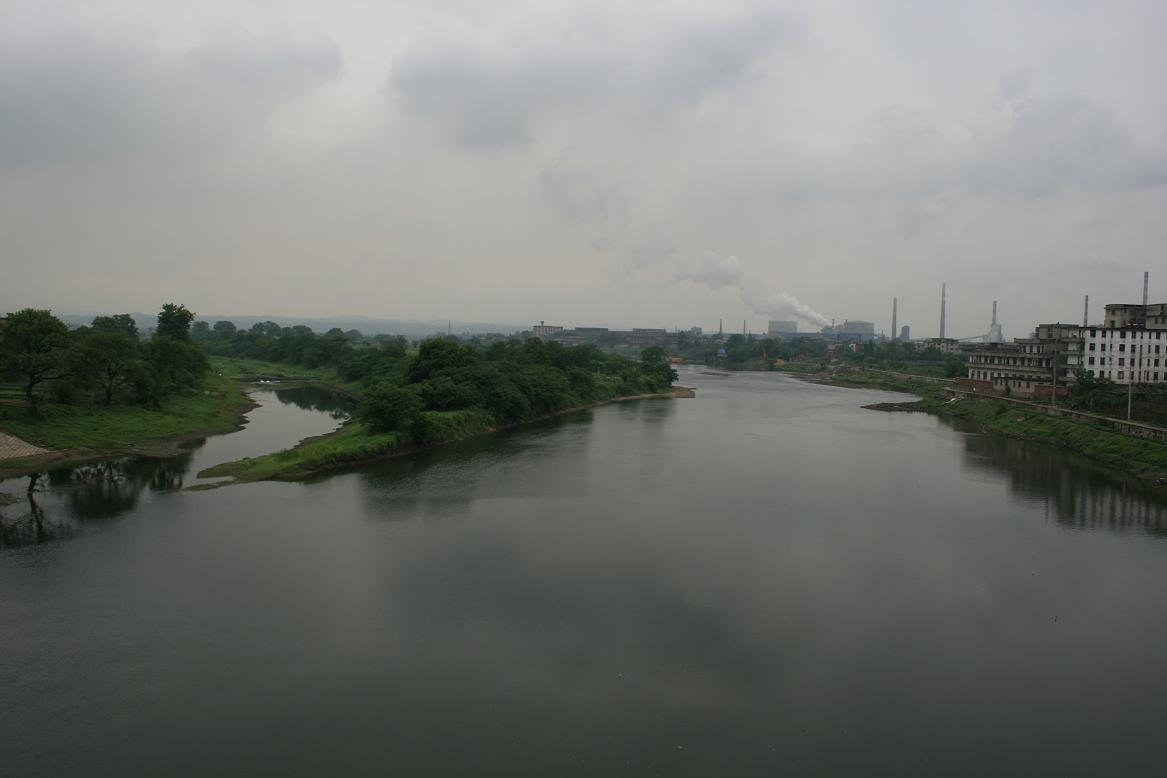
Yuanshui river in Xinyu.

The Yuanshui River (Chinese: 袁水; pinyin: Yuán Shuǐ) is a 279-km-long tributary of the Gan River in western Jiangxi province of China. It rises on the Mount Wugong and flows generally from west to east across Luxi, Yichun, Fenyi and Xinyu and joins the Gan River at Zhangshu.
