= Liu Jiakun =

Chinese architect (born 1956)

- 刘家琨
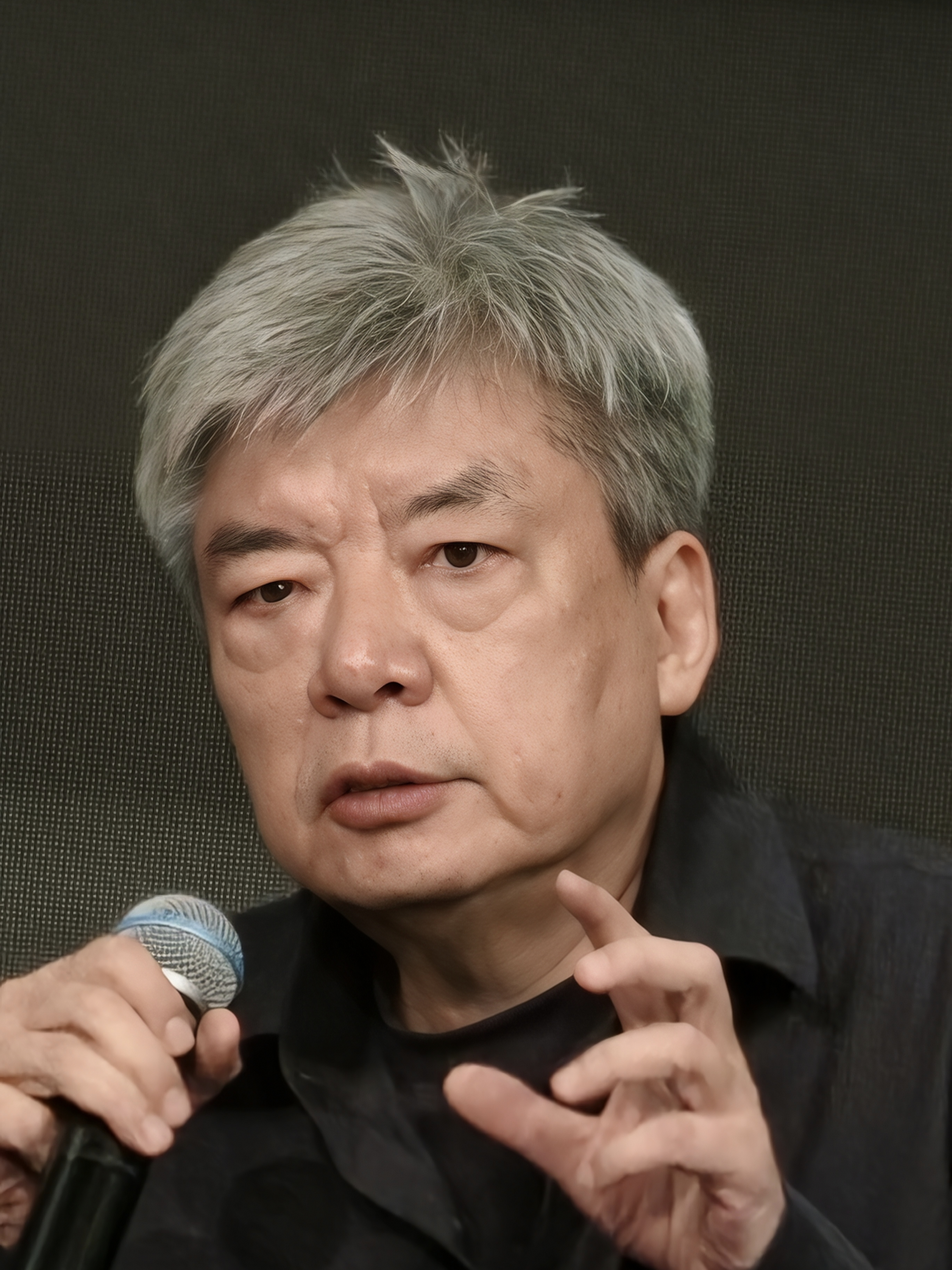
- Liu Jiakun in 2026
- Born: 1956 (age 69–70); Chengdu, Sichuan, China
- Citizenship: Chinese
- Education: Chongqing University (Bachelor of Engineering in Architecture)
- Occupation: Architect
- Awards: Pritzker Architecture Prize
- Practice: Jiakun Architects
- Buildings: Luyeyuan Stone Sculpture Art Museum; Sichuan Fine Arts Institute Sculpture Department; West Village (Chengdu); Suzhou Museum of Imperial Kiln Brick; Tianbao Cave District renovation

Chinese name
- Simplified Chinese: 刘家琨
- Traditional Chinese: 劉家琨
Transcriptions
Standard Mandarin
- Hanyu Pinyin: Liú Jiākūn
- IPA: [ljǒʊ tɕjá.kʰwə́n]
- Website: Jiakun Architects

Liu Jiakun (born 1956) is a Chinese architect known for his focus on minimalism, humanism, and locally contextual design. In 2025, he won the Pritzker Prize. Liu's work emphasises local context and materials, and many of his buildings were constructed in his home city of Chengdu.

== Early life and education ==
Liu was born in Chengdu, in the Sichuan Province of China. His mother was an internist doctor at Chengdu Second People's Hospital. As a 17-year old during the Cultural Revolution, he was sent to the countryside to serve as a laborer, as part of the country's zhiqing (rusticated youth) program. Initially aspiring to be an artist, he was drawn to architecture due to its connection with drawing and design. He graduated in 1982 from the Chongqing Institute of Architecture and Engineering (now part of Chongqing University) with a Bachelor of Engineering degree in Architecture.

== Career ==
After graduation, Liu worked at the state-owned Chengdu Architectural Design and Research Institute. He later spent time in the Tibet and Xinjiang autonomous regions of China, exploring art and literature. He returned to architecture in 1993 after being inspired by an exhibition by former classmate Tang Hua (Chinese: 汤桦).

In 1999, he founded Jiakun Architects in Chengdu.

=== Exhibitions and international recognition ===
Liu's designs have been exhibited internationally, including at the Venice Architecture Biennale and a solo exhibition at Berlin's AEDES Gallery. In 2018, he was commissioned to design the Serpentine Pavilion in Beijing.
