= Tourism in China =

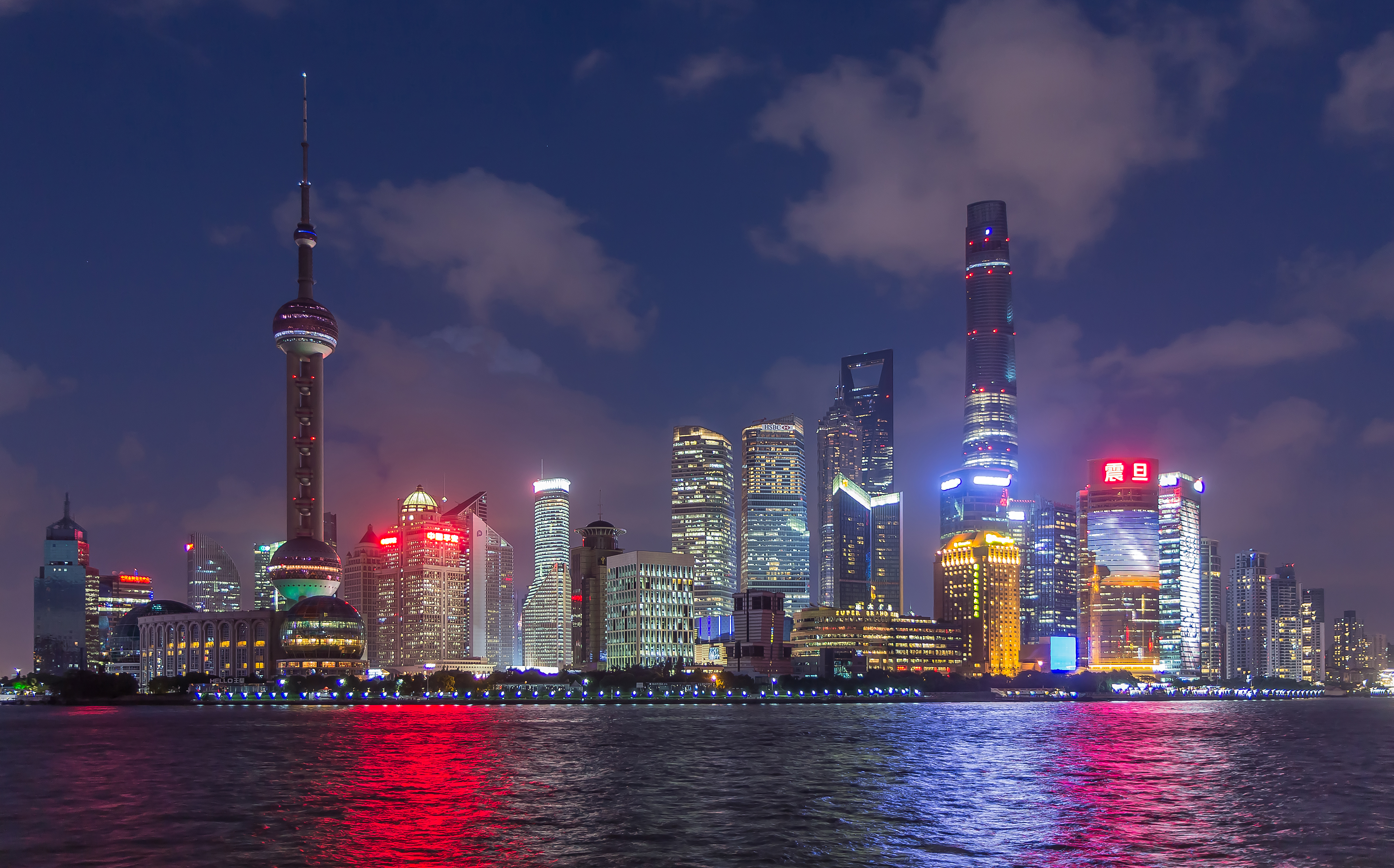
Shanghai's skyline attracts foreign and domestic tourists to view it from the Bund

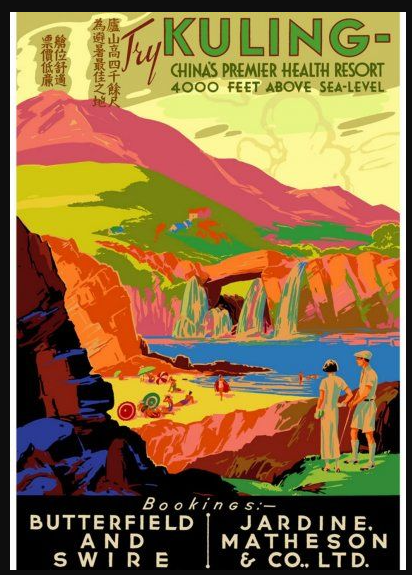
Kuling Poster in the 1920s, Kuling, Jiujiang

Tourism in China is a growing industry that is becoming a significant part of the Chinese economy. The rate of tourism has accelerated over the last few decades since the beginning of reform and opening up. The emergence of a newly rich middle class and an easing of restrictions on border movement by the Chinese authorities are both fueling this travel boom. China has become one of world's largest outbound tourist markets. According to Euromonitor International, economic growth and higher incomes in nearby Asian countries may help China to become the world's number one tourist destination by 2030.

China ranked second in the world for travel and tourism's contribution to GDP in 2022 ($814.1 billion), and first in the world for travel and tourism's contribution to employment (66,086,000 jobs in 2014). Tourism, based on direct, indirect, and induced impact, accounted for 9.3 percent of China's GDP in 2013. In 2017, the total contributions of China's travel and tourism sector made up 11% of its GDP. In 2018, the domestic tourism sector contributed around US$1.47 trillion to the nation's GDP.

Since 2012, tourists from China have been the world's top spender in international tourism, leading global outbound travel. In 2016, the country accounted for 21% of the world's international tourism spending, or $261 billion. (The statistics include journeys made to the special administrative regions of Hong Kong and Macau, as well as Taiwan; in 2017, these accounted for 69.5m of the so-called "overseas" journeys.) As of 2018, only 7% of Chinese had a passport, so the "potential for further growth is staggering", according to a UK news report.

A 2026 report from Chinese state media noted a significant rise in inbound tourism, with ticket bookings during the New Year holiday increasing by 110% year-on-year and reservations for experiential leisure activities growing more and thirtyfold, reflecting increasing international interest in cultural and immersive travel experiences in China.

== History ==
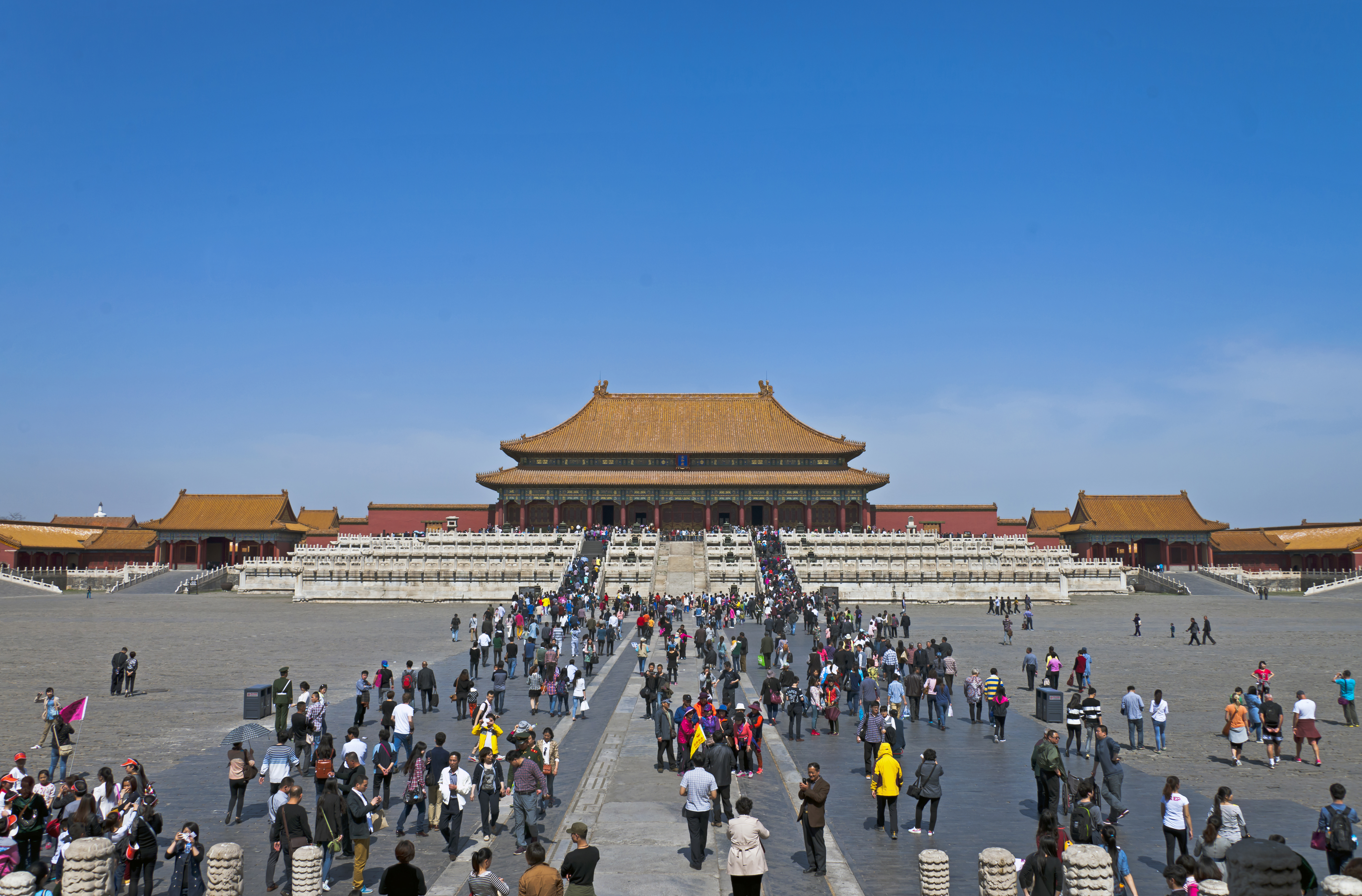
Tourists inside the Forbidden City, Beijing

Until the late imperial period, tourism for the primary purpose of leisure or sightseeing was generally limited to pilgrimages and the literati.

Tourism began emerging as part of bourgeois lifestyle and was a nascent industry during China's nationalist era. The first Chinese-operated travel agency in China was founded by banker Chen Guangfu in 1923. European, American, and Japanese travel agencies had operated in China since the early 1900s, but only served the citizens of those countries.

After the People's Republic of China was founded in 1949, tourism was not a contributing sector of the company's economy due to the PRC's political system and the political and economic blocks imposed on China by Western countries. China's tourism bureau was a government agency which handled tourism matters viewed as important to China's foreign relations. The state-owned tourism company China International Travel Service (CITS) was established in 1954. "International" in this context referred to diplomacy. CITS handled inbound tourism work for self-funded tourists and state-invited guests. The PRC's earliest tourists came from the Soviet Union and other socialist countries.

In 1956, the State Council established Overseas Chinese Service Agency, which was renamed Overseas Chinese Travel Service the next year. It focused on facilitating the travel of overseas Chinese and Hong Kong and Macao people visiting relatives and joining sightseeing tours.

In 1958, the Secretary-General of the State Council was placed in charge of CITS and its branches were transferred to local governments.

Organized around diplomatic and political purposes, tourism in China provided tours such as the production study tour (shengchan guanmo tuan) or the industry and commerce study tour (gongshang kaocha tuan). Premier Zhou Enlai stated that the purpose of tourism was "to xuanchuan ourselves, understand others, wield influence, and gain sympathy". Through CITS and the Overseas Chinese Travel Service, China provided travel service to overseas Chinese visiting China and foreign tourists who might spread a positive image of China to their home countries.

In addition to its significance in diplomacy and promoting socialist ideology abroad, tourism was significant during the Mao Zedong era as a way for China to earn foreign currency. Tourism was an important mechanism for encouraging remittances from overseas Chinese in the 1950s and into the 1960s.

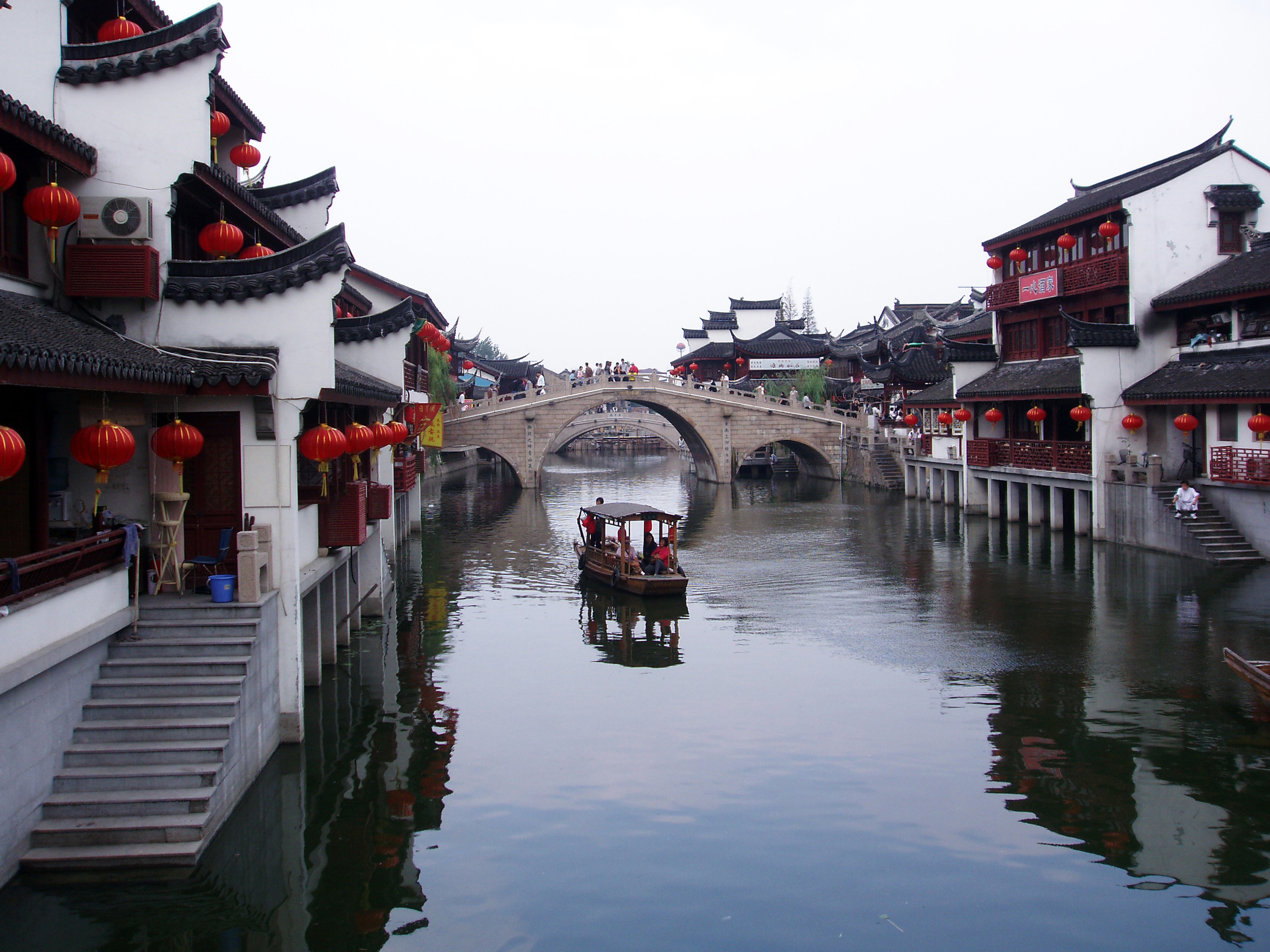
Bridge at Nanxi Street over Puhuitang River

In 1964, the Standing Committee of the National People's Congress approved the creation of the China Travel and Tourism Enterprise Administration (CTEA), which later became the China National Tourism Administration.

In 1964, the Japanese government began allowing its citizens to visit the PRC. The next year, Japan became the single largest source of inbound tourists to the PRC.

In the early phases of the Cultural Revolution, international tourism came to a halt. In this period, Red Guards denounced China Travel Service and CITS for their foreign connections. The issue of tourism became less contentious again in 1970.

In the period leading to the PRC's 1971 admission into the United Nations, Mao authorized state tourism authorities to increase the number of foreign tourists permitted into China, and to allow the entry not just of political leftists and others deemed "foreign friends," but self-financed rightists travels as well. At the 1971 National Tourism Work Conference, tourism was deemed an important part of China's foreign affairs work. Between 1971 and 1978, the number of foreigners admitted through CTEA increased by a factor of 20, and its earnings of foreign currency increased by a factor of nearly 120.

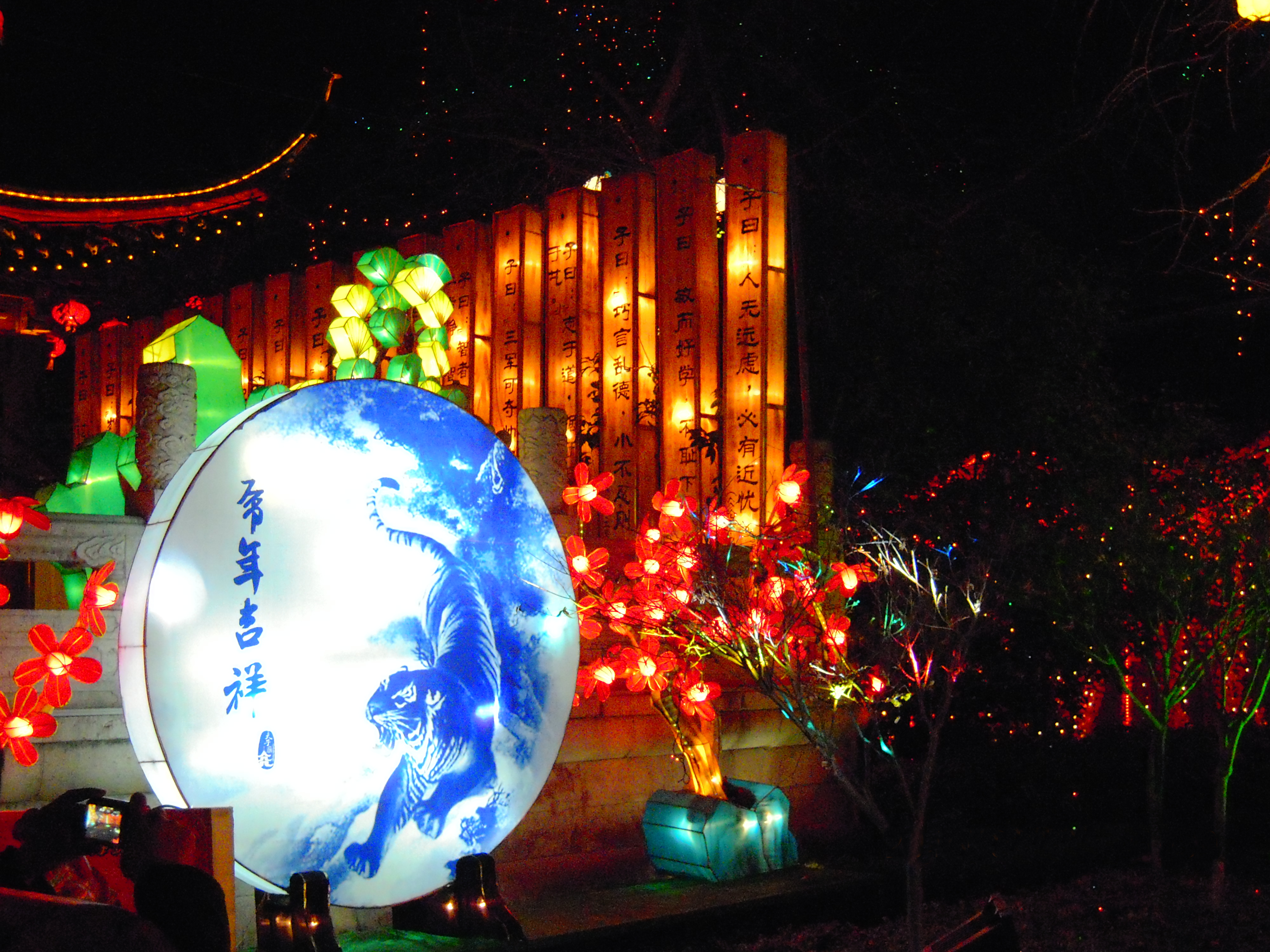
Lantern Festival in Nanjing

After the Cultural Revolution, tourism was increasingly linked to the Four Modernizations. In 1977, the National Tourism Planning forum stated that the mission of tourism was to earn foreign currency to fund the Four Modernizations. Beginning in 1978 and 1979, Deng Xiaoping promoted the development of tourism for purposes of economic development. As tourism became an important means of obtaining foreign currency for the government, China emphasized its exotic qualities to international tourists. By 1980, China's tourism business had grown further.

The expansion of domestic and international airline traffic and other tourist transportation facilities made travel more convenient. Over 250 cities and countries had been opened to foreign visitors by the mid-1980s. Travellers needed only valid visas or residence permits to visit 100 locations; the remaining locales required travel permits from public security departments. In 1985 approximately 1.4 million foreigners visited China, and nearly US$1.3 billion was earned from tourism.

In the 1990s, a trend towards heritage tourism resulted in an increase of tourist visits to small towns across the country.

In 2015, China was the fourth most visited country in the world, after France, United States, and Spain, with 56.9 million international tourists per year. In 2017, tourism contributed about CNY 8.77 trillion (US$1.45 trillion), 11.04% of the GDP, and contributed direct and indirect employment of up to 28.25 million people. There were 139.48 million inbound trips and five billion domestic trips.

In 2018, the Chinese hotel industry had a pipeline of 2,500 new hotel projects.

In 2018, China formed the Ministry of Culture and Tourism by merging the prior Ministry of Culture and the China National Tourism Administration.

== Statistics ==
Yearly tourist arrivals in millions

China has become a major tourist destination following its reform and opening up to the world in the late 1970s instigated by Deng Xiaoping. In 1978, China received about 230,000 international foreign tourists, mostly because of the severe limitations that the government placed on who was allowed to visit the country and who was not.

Data from 2016 showed that the majority of foreign visitors hailed from Asian countries, with South Korea being the top source country for China inbound tourism. Among the number of tourist arrivals, 81.06 million are from Hong Kong, 23.5 million from Macau and 5.73 million coming from Taiwan. The number of foreigners visiting China in the same year was 28.15 million.

In the same year, overnight visitors increased 4.2% over the same period of 2015 to 59.27 million (of which over 60% came from Hong Kong, Macau and Taiwan).

=== Visitor statistics ===
Most visitors arriving in mainland China were from the following areas of residence or countries of nationality:

Origin	2019	2018	2017	2016	2015	2014	2013
Hong Kong	80,500,736	79,368,424	79,795,890	81,059,391	79,448,100	76,131,700	76,884,000
Macau	26,789,348	25,150,834	24,649,971	23,503,215	22,888,200	20,639,900	20,740,333
Myanmar	12,421,753	12,379,845	9,655,453	2,428,074	144,373	132,787	134,671
Vietnam	7,948,664	7,587,932	6,544,198	3,167,273	2,160,756	1,709,437	1,365,402
Taiwan	6,134,236	6,136,081	5,871,268	5,729,955	5,498,600	5,365,900	5,162,509
South Korea	4,346,567	4,191,790	3,854,869	4,762,163	4,444,389	4,181,700	3,968,998
Russia	2,722,571	2,414,301	2,344,646	1,975,910	1,582,279	2,045,800	2,186,281
Japan	2,676,334	2,689,662	2,680,033	2,587,440	2,497,657	2,717,600	2,877,533
United States	2,406,657	2,483,554	2,309,282	2,247,752	2,085,800	2,093,200	2,085,253
Mongolia	1,862,278	1,915,832	1,864,012	1,342,308	1,014,102	1,082,700	1,049,997
Malaysia	1,383,502	1,290,744	1,232,499	1,163,869	1,075,451	1,129,600	1,206,535
Philippines	1,177,668	1,202,966	1,160,875	1,134,749	1,004,008	967,900	996,672
Singapore	1,008,545	978,028	940,223	921,887	905,269	971,400	966,605
Thailand	870,526	832,605	775,747	749,020	641,483	613,100	651,654
India	869,570	708,517	818,954	799,134	730,490	709,900	676,682
Canada	776,328	849,941	805,026	740,788	679,800	667,100	684,216
Australia	734,511	751,865	733,663	673,248	637,300	672,100	723,088
Indonesia	724,784	708,517	680,841	632,913	544,762	566,900	605,321
Germany	622,198	643,074	634,053	622,668	623,374	662,600	649,298
United Kingdom	612,213	607,846	590,714	594,287	579,637	604,700	624,955
North Korea	555,028	250,654	229,467	209,521	188,337	184,400	206,617
France	490,963	499,160	493,712	503,480	486,935	517,000	533,538
Italy	279,474	277,776	279,686	266,793	246,145	253,100	251,162
Laos	278,469	305,200	230,925	83,603	26,136	21,697	19,399
Kazakhstan	211,577	195,081	222,946	225,406	241,478	343,600	393,530
Netherlands	192,338	196,183	193,960	199,464	181,789	180,400	188,562
Ukraine	182,399	180,725	171,766	160,439	141,706	118,082	121,938
Nepal	177,779	157,543	132,510	83,317	49,954	53,600	58,817
Spain	165,984	167,988	155,564	149,626	136,333	141,000	132,378
New Zealand	149,553	146,403	143,471	136,031	125,400	126,600	128,572
Pakistan	131,089	130,944	127,265	119,057	113,087	108,900	106,548
Brazil	127,631	118,828	105,189	93,316	85,487	94,559	95,754
Bangladesh	113,847	101,622	91,531	85,016	80,196	69,776	58,872
Cambodia	109,322	101,645	61,603	49,894	42,455	39,285	34,578
Iran	104,817	96,910	136,681	128,036	113,164	113,687	88,895
Sweden	103,600	109,991	111,758	115,216	118,362	142,000	159,951
Poland	98,987	95,338	90,511	83,942	74,823	76,135	71,598
Mexico	94,312	92,546	82,134	73,326	68,300	65,800	60,144
Israel	94,289	97,484	91,540	82,945	76,165	78,520	79,699
South Africa	85,606	83,621	74,940	66,703	65,451	68,230	68,613
Egypt	81,635	85,556	83,509	82,850	86,509	83,925	74,443
Turkey	77,748	74,409	75,451	79,092	99,538	106,163	103,947
Switzerland	70,468	73,931	72,096	72,556	72,675	79,500	80,557
Belgium	68,912	69,248	68,224	66,650	65,183	67,400	68,404
Austria	68,653	70,279	67,573	65,932	60,758	64,800	65,711
Denmark	67,240	70,023	70,239	71,588	70,873	77,556	81,385
Sri Lanka	61,983	63,043	63,039	60,328	58,059	50,000	49,488
Portugal	57,219	56,314	56,259	54,985	53,387	52,300	49,395
Finland	57,159	57,967	57,812	57,891	55,110	60,283	65,662
Romania	46,247	45,630	48,740	47,789	43,589	41,020	37,950
Uzbekistan	45,158	41,025	46,358	52,632	55,398	63,044	57,717
Greece	44,835	44,949	42,198	38,580	36,694	35,719	34,460
Ireland	44,351	44,002	41,953	42,353	41,600	42,046	41,229
Colombia	42,476	40,165	40,062	37,810	35,955	37,299	34,636
Nigeria	41,961	45,367	46,247	52,444	54,149	54,458	45,582
Kyrgyzstan	41,840	38,269	34,289	44,278	43,733	50,400	49,936
Serbia	41,002	35,384	27,559	19,155	14,038	12,560	11,441
Czech Republic	38,399	33,367	34,571	32,684	24,720	23,123	20,640
Norway	36,158	38,743	39,065	38,244	41,113	47,900	51,439
Belarus	33,883	24,745	19,154	17,255	13,904	15,575	14,347
Saudi Arabia	33,875	32,007	34,553	37,377	35,300	36,148	36,531
Argentina	30,598	34,229	35,132	32,422	28,407	24,427	26,488
Algeria	29,333	26,961	26,531	25,735	26,568	27,331	29,565
Jordan	27,983	28,309	29,615	30,885	26,540	27,668	28,151
Tajikistan	27,169	26,141	22,465	20,930	24,961	33,610	31,916
Total	65,730,000	62,900,000	60,740,000	59,270,000	56,890,000	55,620,000	55,690,000

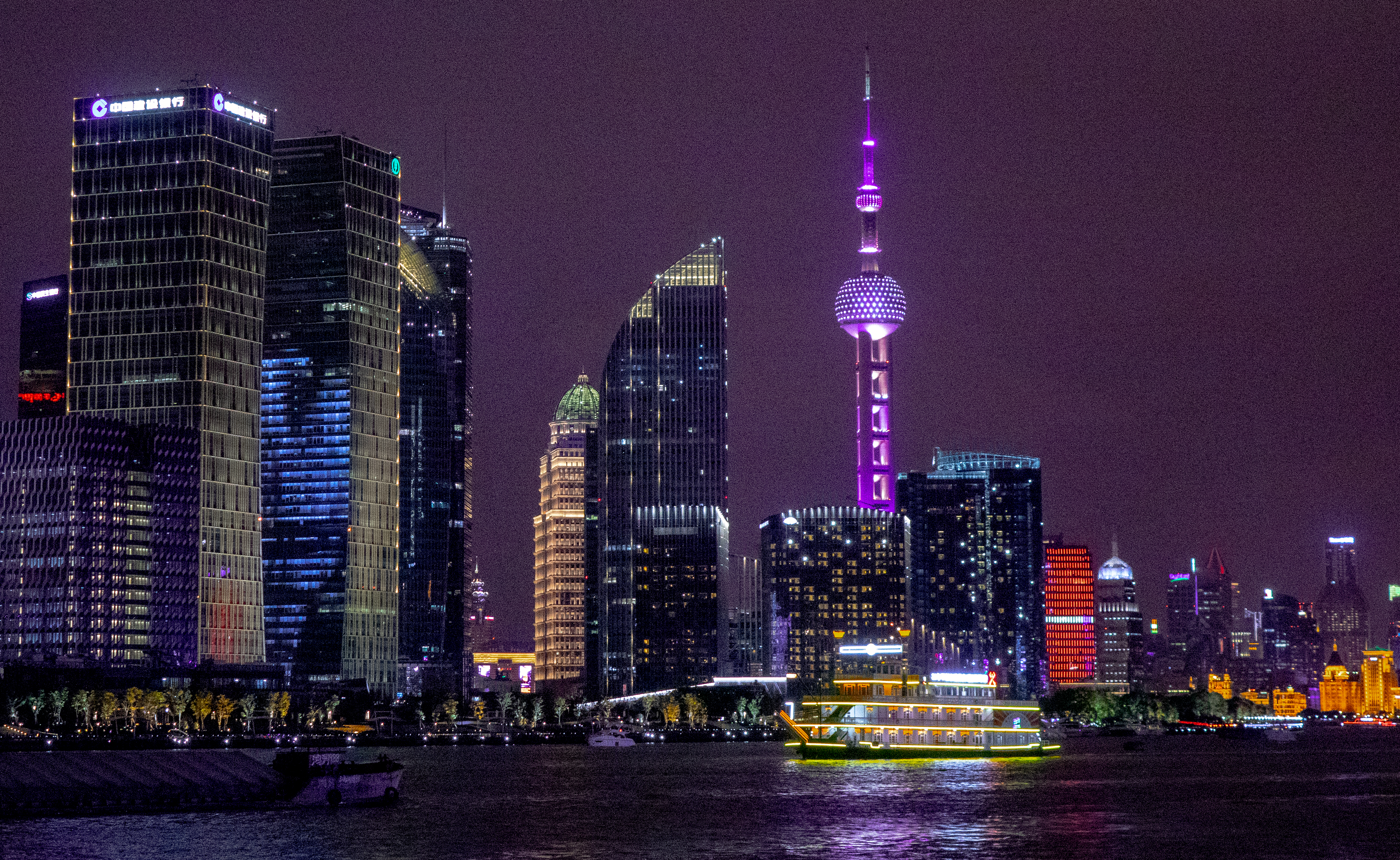
Sightseeing boats ply the river in Shanghai, providing just a tiny percent of the revenue from tourism

=== Foreign and Hong Kong/Macau arrivals in Beijing ===
Origin	2026/4	2025	2024	2019	2018
Russia	303,666	504,868	293,206	95,858	87,419
Hong Kong	158,301	479,748	441,201	322,432	348,219
Taiwan	132,333	381,745	246,466	221,802	241,953
United States	111,043	354,575	352,732	629,287	719,898
Malaysia	105,385	298,751	208,605	81,815	87,105
South Korea	79,919	245,669	147,705	242,365	247,528
Thailand	67,471	152,625	116,074	56,726	74,577
Singapore	67,167	232,672	205,322	126,815	122,864
Australia	65,885	168,132	103,791	141,090	150,014
Indonesia	63,041	138,962	87,024	44,555	49,729
Germany	56,850	159,737	168,074	197,940	194,299
Mongolia	56,135	162,773	113,342	28,518	31,123
United Kingdom	48,999	111,263	122,443	152,722	159,341
Vietnam	46,860	158,088	93,454	19,726	13,455
France	43,318	129,934	104,042	119,959	126,598
Japan	43,204	184,483	174,047	246,675	248,569
Canada	41,064	113,569	74,862	99,822	151,553
Italy	37,831	123,787	87,063	69,158	65,167
Spain	30,313	99,097	62,841	45,437	47,740
Philippines	21,567	40,023	22,215	31,383	26,317
India	21,296	65,931	56,184	74,779	67,536
Macau	15,248	61,955	41,210	17,652	16,235
New Zealand	11,257	32,075	22,032	21,903	19,800
Sweden	9,164	20,721	16,929	27,063	30,123
Switzerland	7,842	22,211	18,310	30,413	31,846
Pakistan	7,724	26,537	14,573	10,784	11,135
Myanmar	4,706	12,365	5,365	4,607	3,723
North Korea	1,726	7,751	7,751	7,444	8,155
Total	1,988,158	5,432,388	3,305,015	3,768,958	4,004,078

== Language ==
Some form of Chinese is virtually universal in China, with Mandarin as the standard form and many other varieties also in use; some, like Cantonese and Shanghainese, have tens of millions of speakers.

According to research completed by The Daily Telegraph in 2017, less than 1 percent of people (some 10 million) in China speak English conversationally.

== Domestic tourism ==
Red tourism first developed in comparatively small villages around the mid-1990s. A significant rise in red tourism occurred in the late 1990s, prompted by the development of tourism as a significantly profitable economic sector and celebrations and commemorations related to the Communist Party's past becoming settled into tradition. The government promotes red tourism, which in its view strengthens revolutionary traditions, enhances patriotism, and promotes a unique national spirit.

Industrial heritage tourism includes former Third Front factories which have been re-developed as museums, hotels, and leisure complexes.

A form of agritourism called nongjia le (with the literal meaning, "joy of farmers' families") has been popular among urban Chinese people. This form of tourism is based on farm households where urban people can go for rustic farm fresh food and country-style lodging. It has provided a significant source of additional income for farming households.

There is significant domestic tourism to Macau which benefits from being the only place in China where gambling is legal. Retail in Macau's tourist areas is generally targeted towards tourists from elsewhere in China. Because Macau benefits from favorable taxation rules, it is a favored location for Chinese tourists to purchase luxury goods like cosmetics, jewelry, and designer fashion goods.

=== Qingming Festival ===
During the 2025 Qingming Festival holiday, China saw 126 million domestic trips, a 6.3% increase from the previous year. Tourism revenue reached 57.55 billion yuan (approximately 8 billion USD), up 6.7% year-on-year. The holiday, traditionally focused on tomb sweeping and ancestor worship, also saw a rise in demand for rural getaways and outdoor activities, with self-drive trips, cycling, and hiking being particularly popular.

== Tourist Attraction Rating Categories ==
Tourism in China
- Temple of Heaven, an AAAAA-rated tourist attraction in Beijing
- Simplified Chinese: 旅游景区质量等级
- Traditional Chinese: 旅遊景區質量等級
- Literal meaning: Tourist Scenic Area Quality Ranking
Transcriptions
Standard Mandarin
- Hanyu Pinyin: Lǚyóu Jǐngqū Zhìliàng Děngjí

Tourist Attraction Rating Categories (Chinese: 旅游景区质量等级) is a rating system used by the Chinese authorities to determine the quality of the attraction relative to its peers in terms of safety, sanitation and transportation. It is divided into five categories which are A (or 1A, the lowest level), AA (2A), AAA (3A), AAAA (4A) and AAAAA (5A, the highest level).

The categories are awarded based on, amongst other factors, the importance of the site, transportation, tours as well as issues related to safety and sanitation. The system was established in 1999 and extended in 2004 (when the category AAAAA was introduced). The ratings are administered by the China National Tourism Administration (CNTA) and are based on the code "Categories and Rating Standard of Tourist Attractions".

Ratings	alternate	Level	Quantity
A	1A	lowest	130
AA	2A		927
AAA	3A		521
AAAA	4A		785 (by 2006)
AAAAA	5A	highest	279 (by 2020)

== Cities ==
=== Notable ancient capitals ===
- Xi'an, Shaanxi
- Nanjing, Jiangsu
- Luoyang, Henan
- Xuchang, Henan
- Hangzhou, Zhejiang
- Zhengzhou, Henan
- Anyang, Henan
- Kaifeng, Henan

=== Renowned historic cities and old towns ===
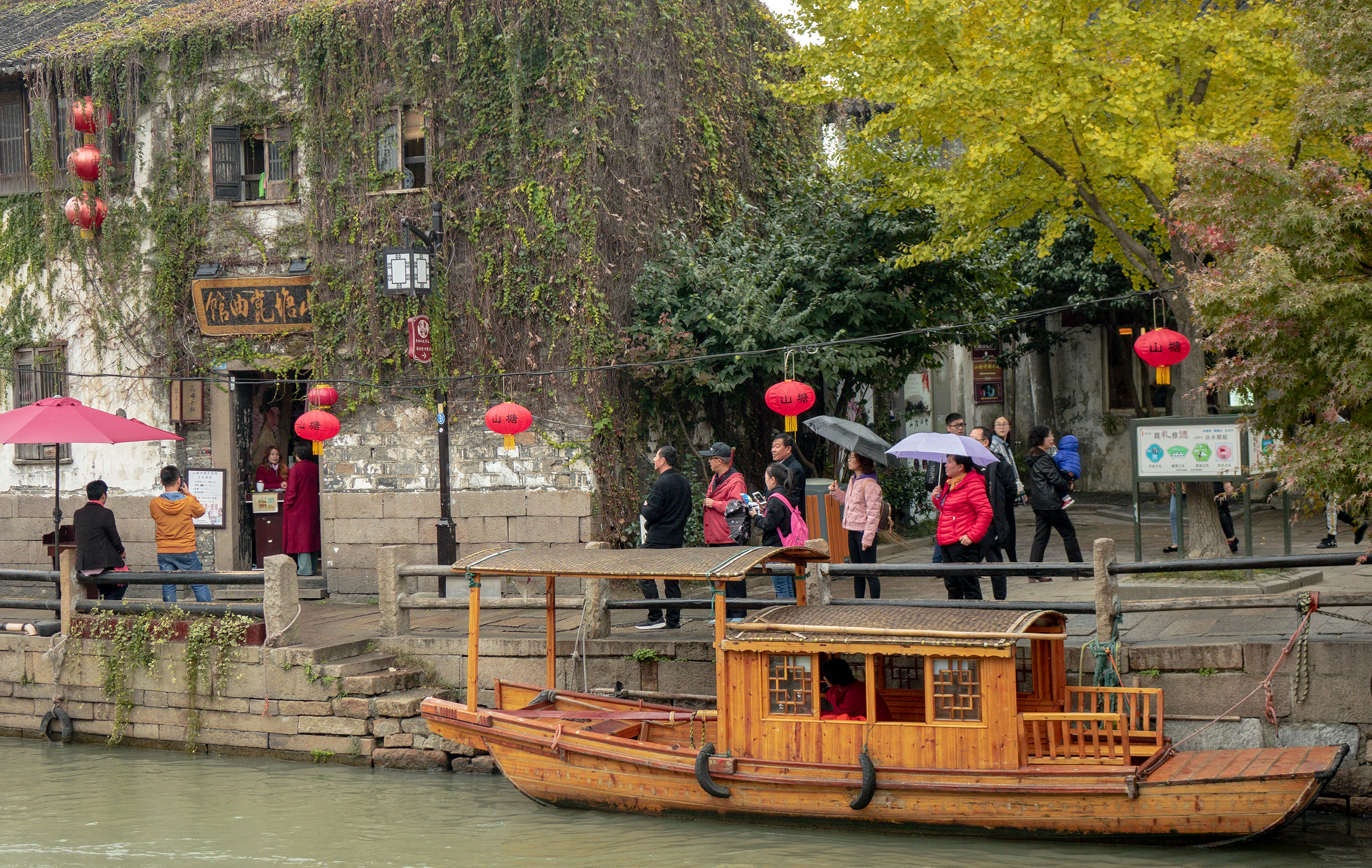
Grand Canal tour boat of a traditional style

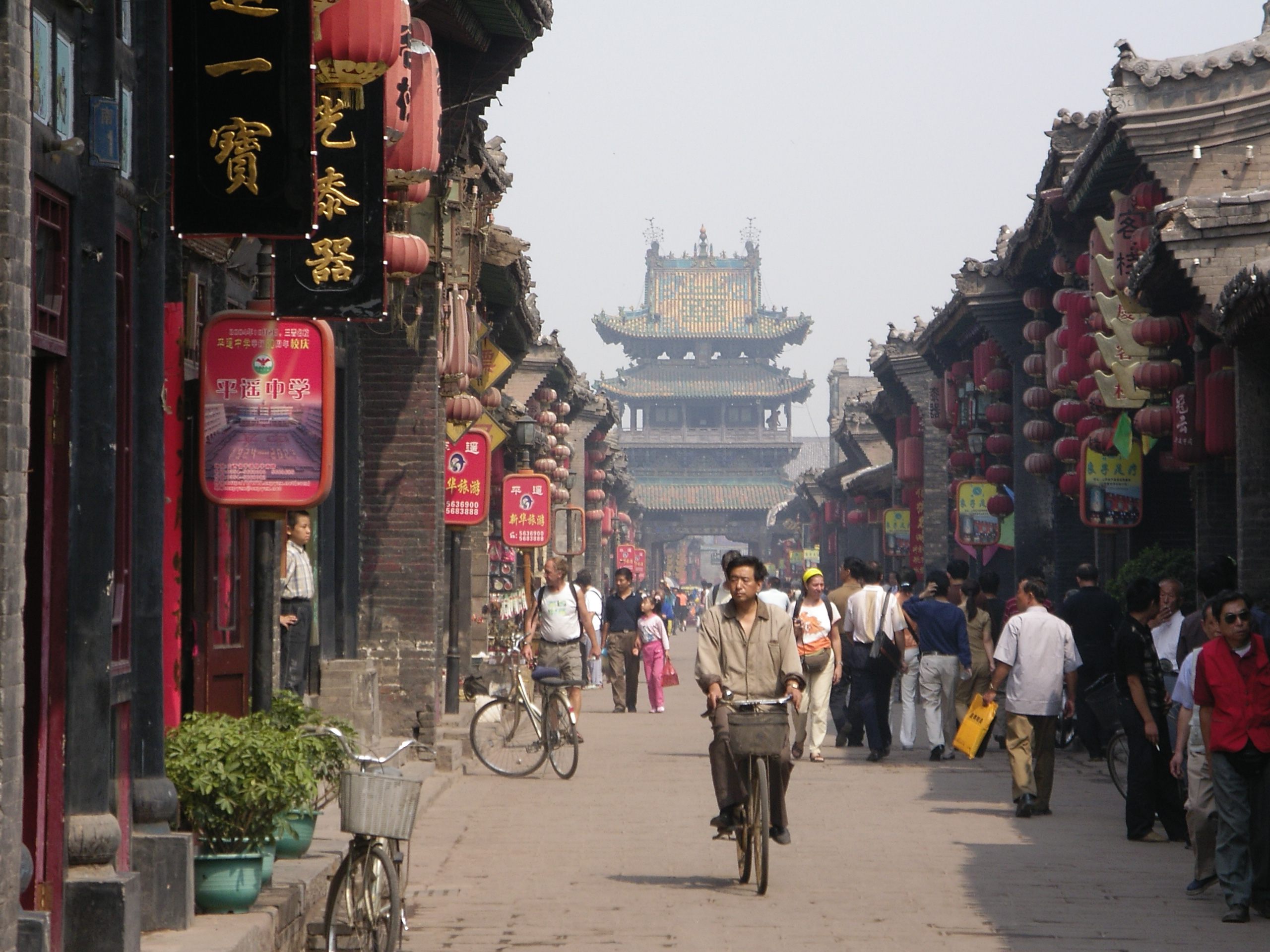
Pingyao, Shanxi

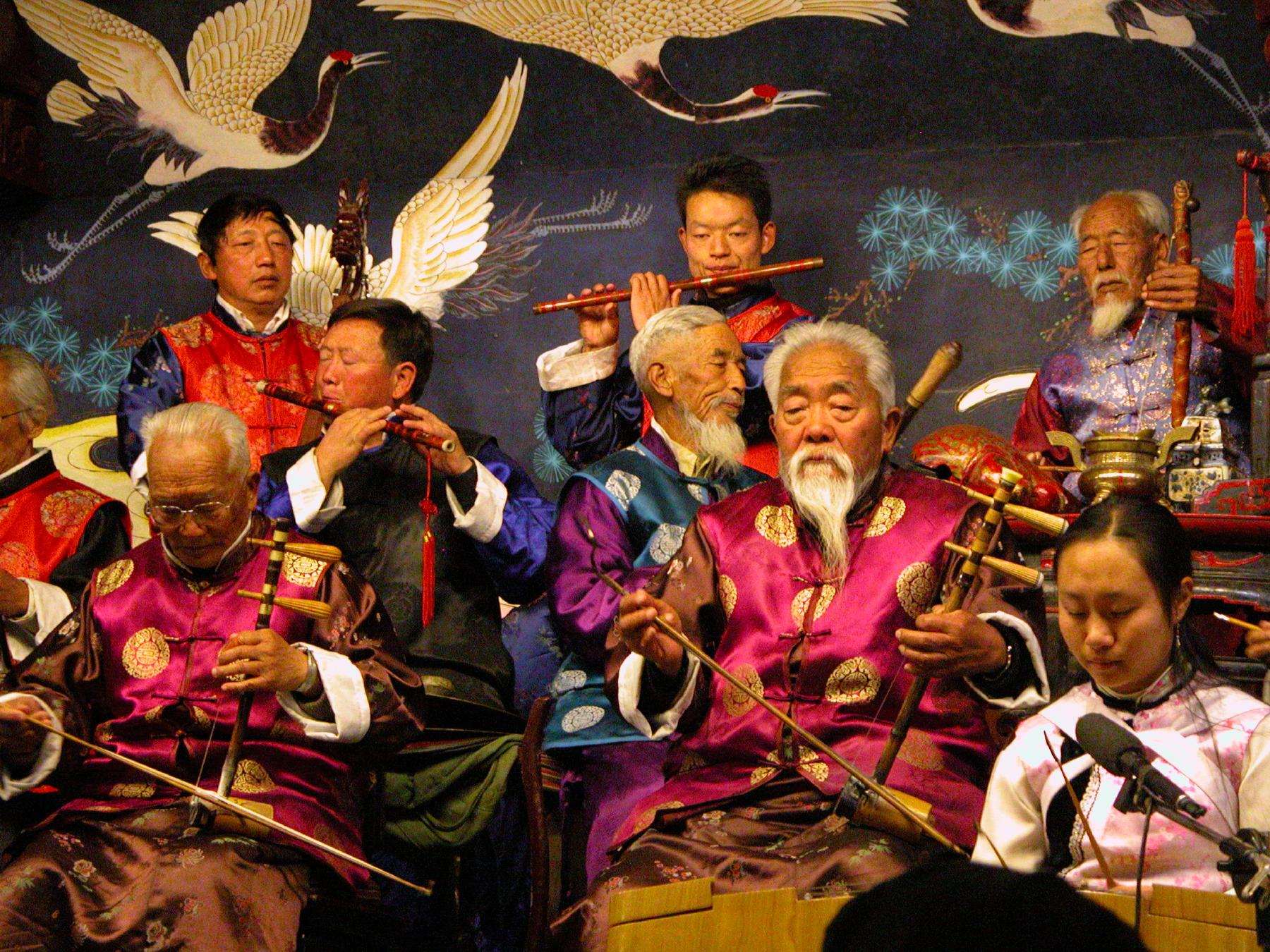
Nakhi dongjing musicians in Lijiang, Yunnan

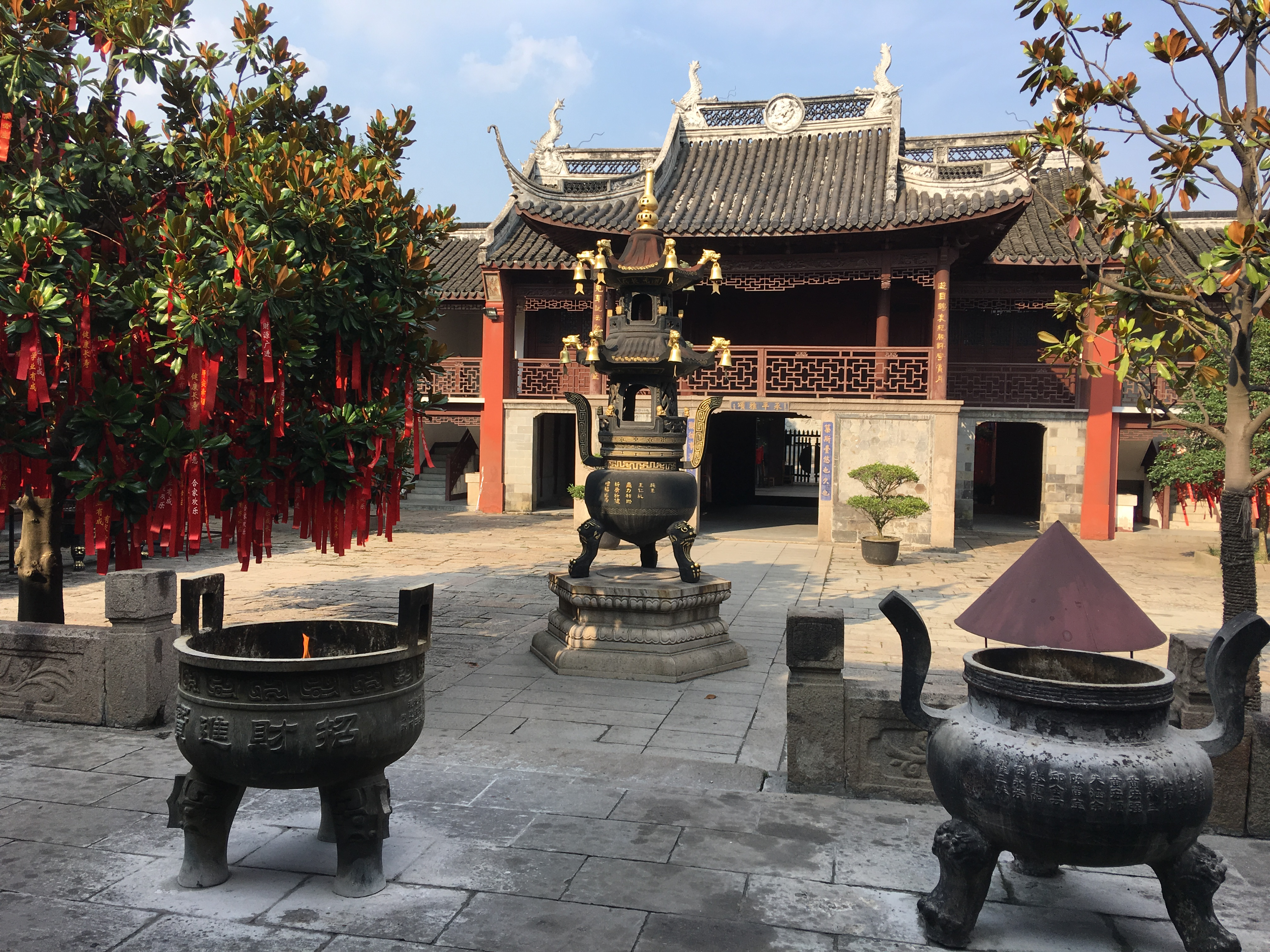
Old City God Temple in Shanghai

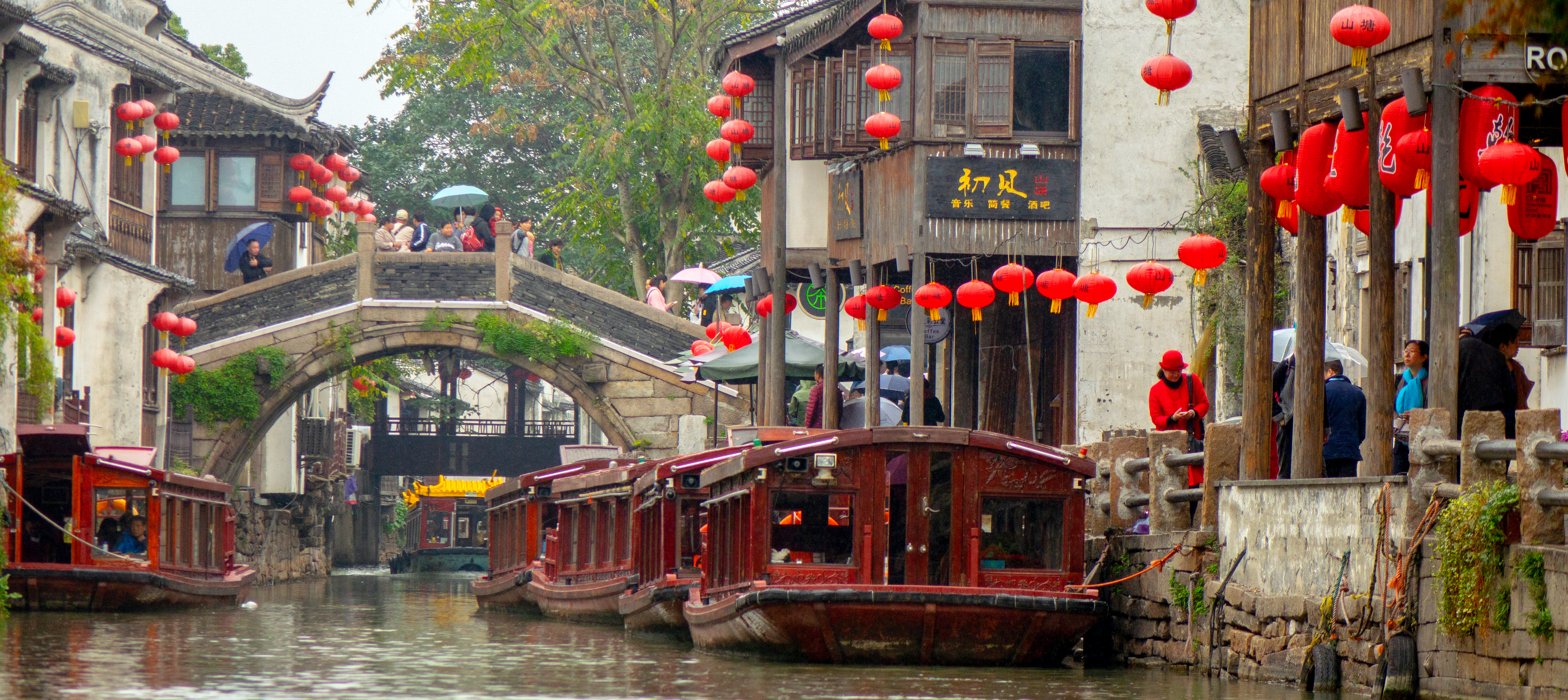
Tour boats in Suzhou, the "Venice of the East"

- Kuling town, Jiangxi
- Chongqing
- Guangzhou, Guangdong
- Chengde, Hebei
- Zhengding, Hebei
- Jingziguan, Henan
- Wuhan, Hubei
- Fenghuang, Hunan
- Huai'an, Jiangsu
- Luzhi, Jiangsu
- Suzhou, Jiangsu
- Tongli, Jiangsu
- Yangzhou, Jiangsu
- Zhenjiang, Jiangsu
- Zhouzhuang, Jiangsu
- Shenyang, Liaoning
- Hancheng, Shaanxi
- Jinan, Shandong
- Qufu, Shandong
- Shanghai & Zhujiajiao
- Pingyao, Shanxi
- Chengdu, Sichuan
- Huanglongxi, Sichuan
- Lizhuang, Sichuan
- Tianjin
- Dali, Yunnan
- Jianshui, Yunnan
- Lijiang, Yunnan
- Nanxun, Zhejiang
- Wuzhen, Zhejiang
- Xitang, Zhejiang
- Dunhuang, Gansu

== Famous sites ==
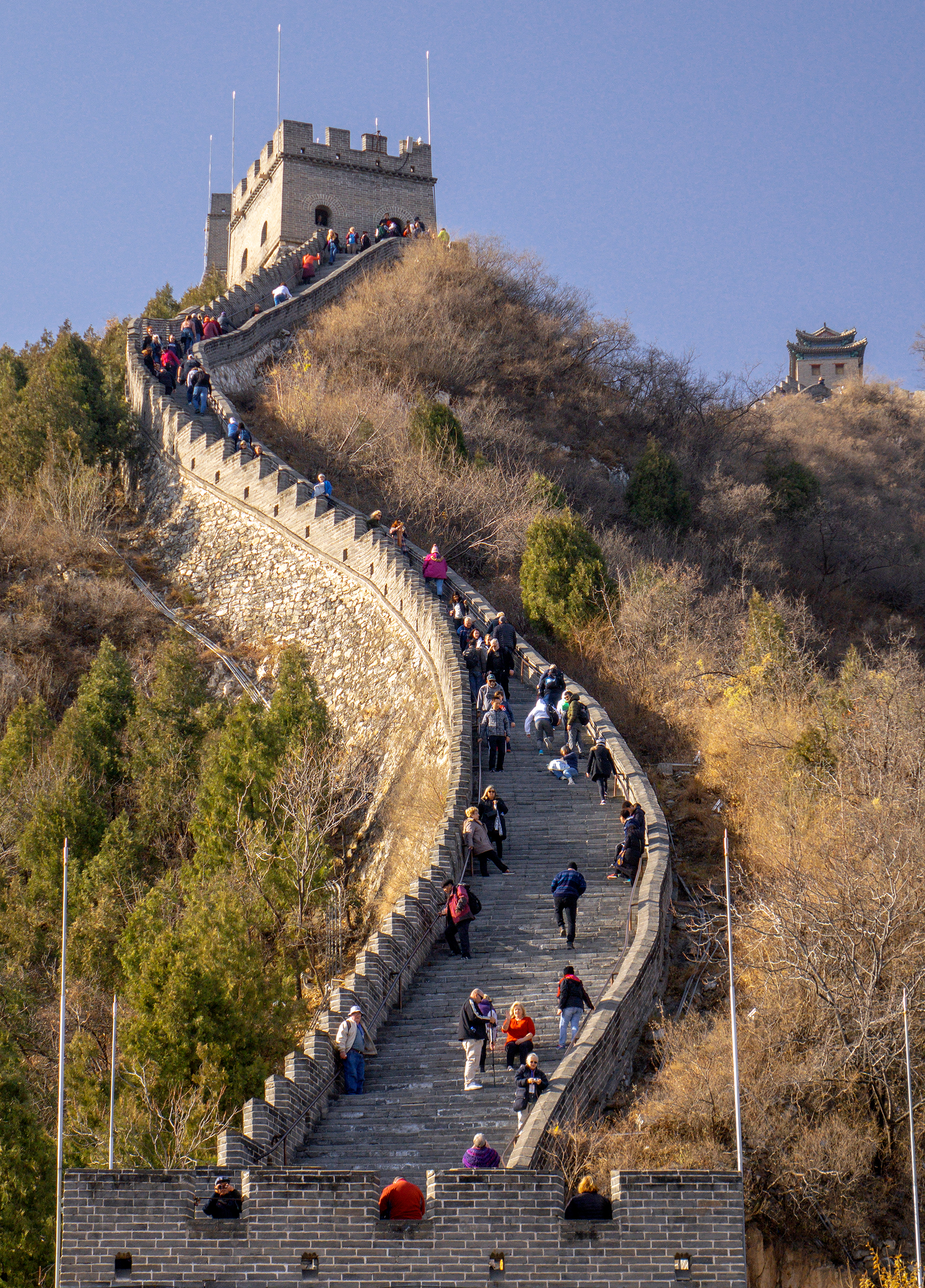
Numerous tourists visit parts of the Great Wall, including the section at Juyongguan

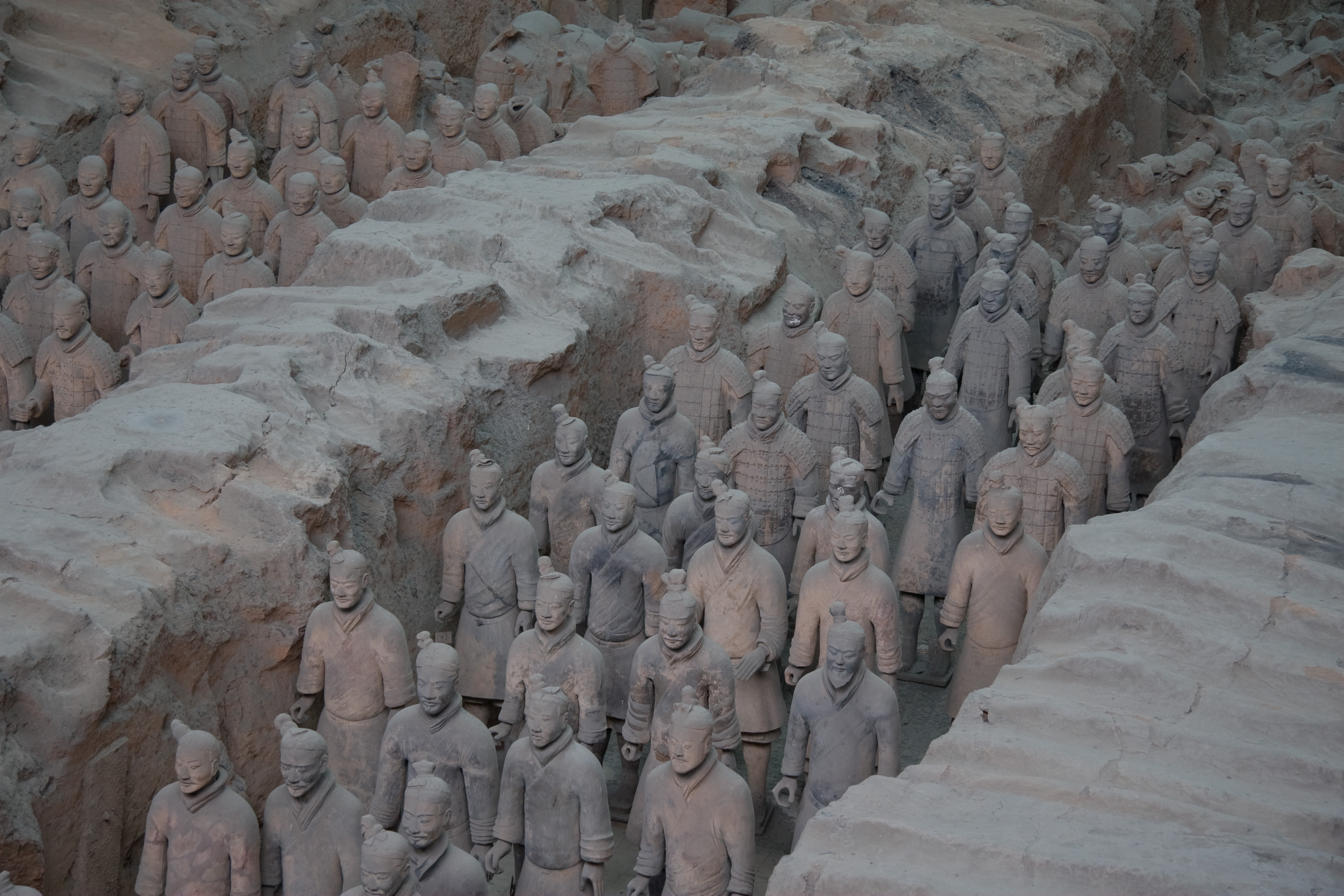
The Terracotta Army in Xi'an

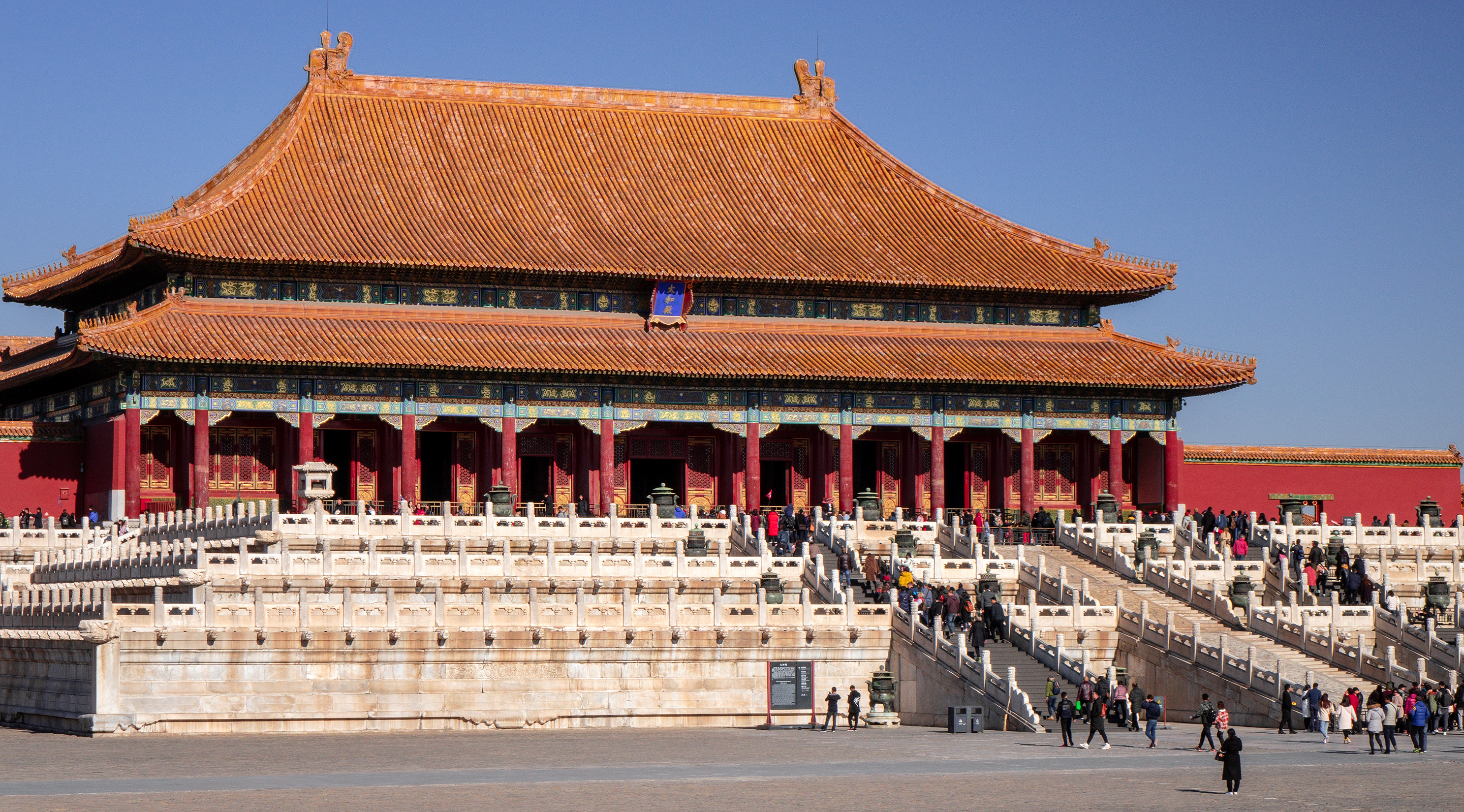
Hall of Supreme Harmony at the Forbidden City

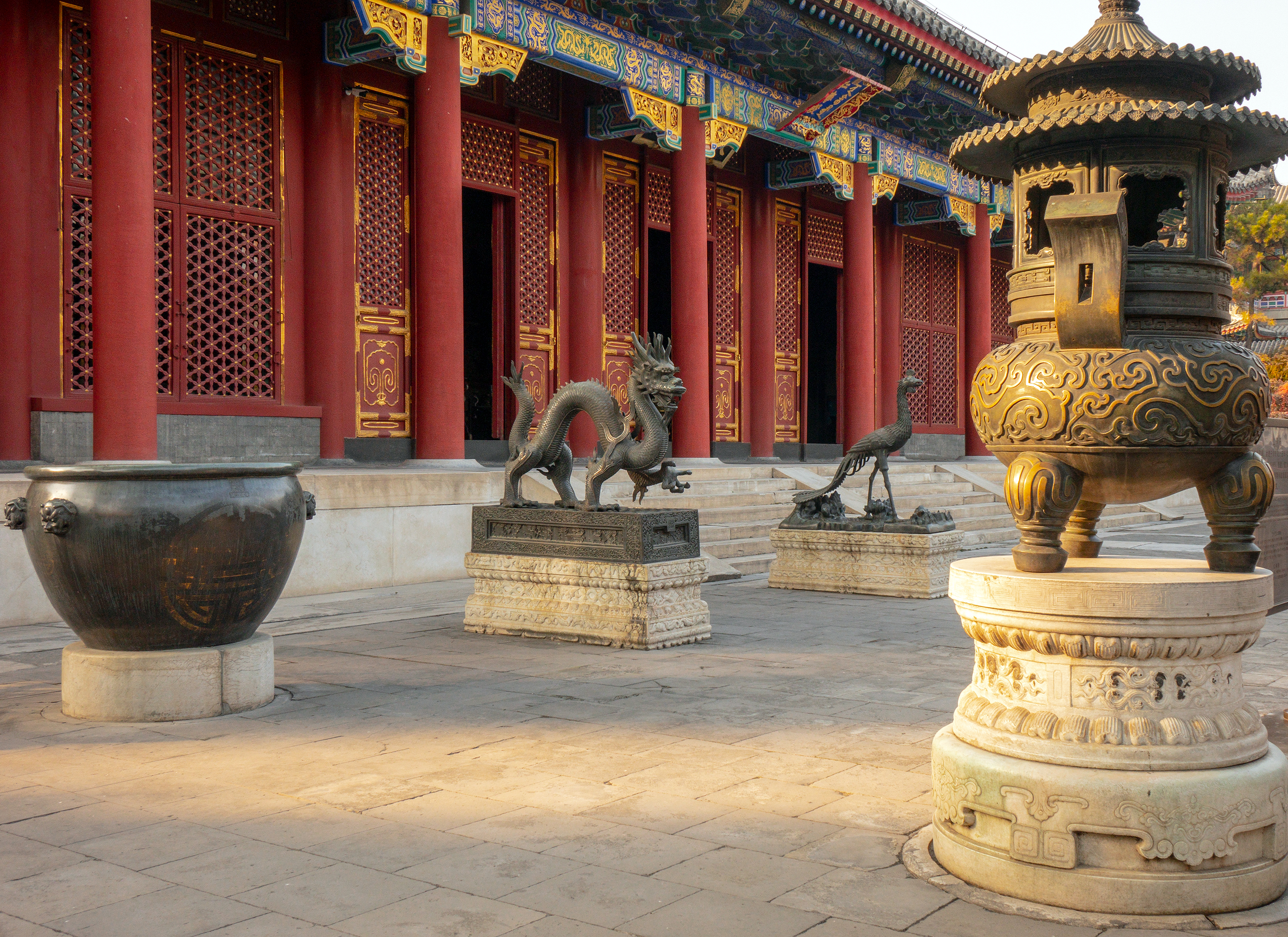
Sculptures at the Hall of Benevolence and Longevity in the Summer Palace

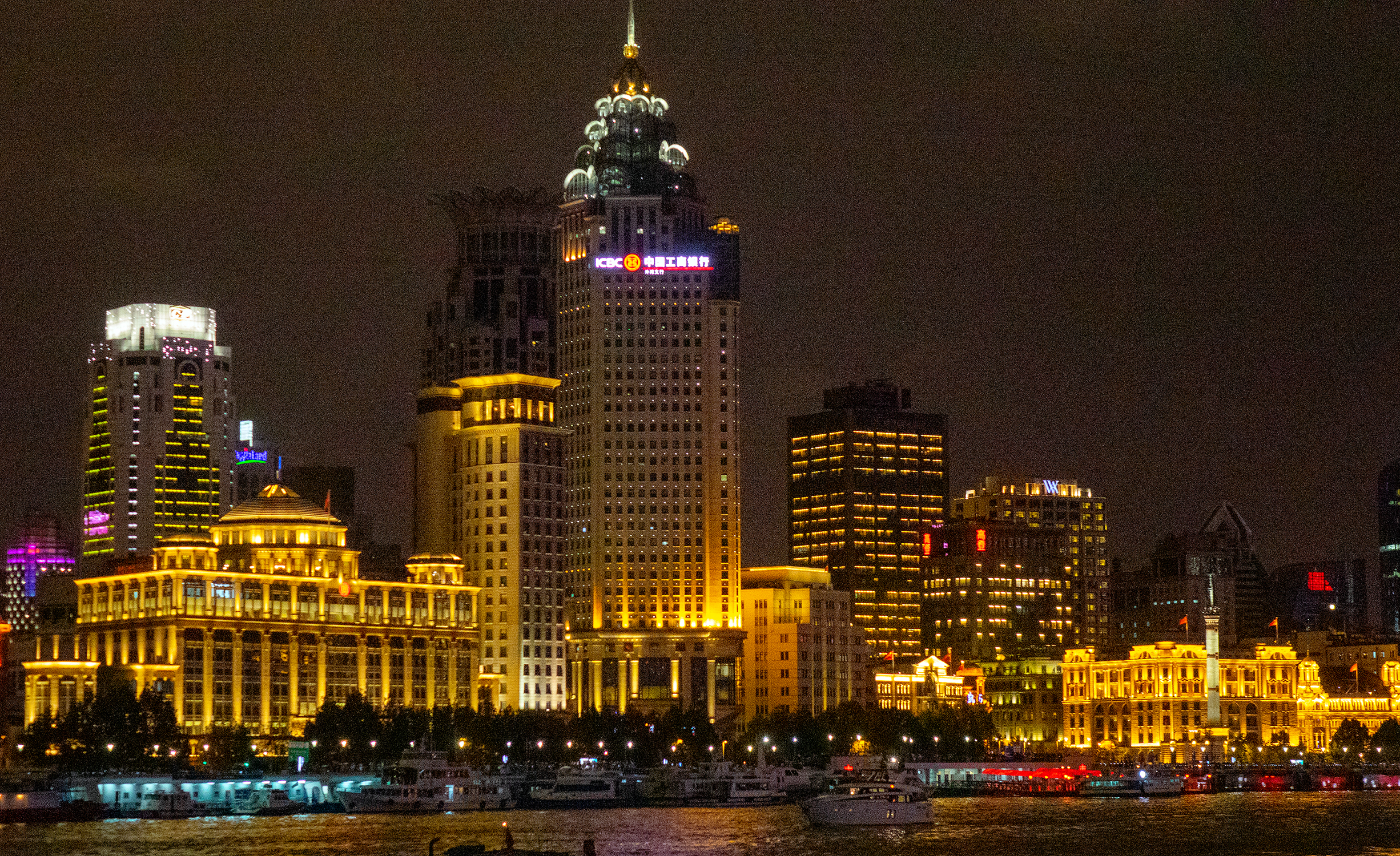
The Bund after dark, Shanghai

- Mount Lu, Jiujiang, Jiangxi, also called Mount Lu National Park
- Changbai Mountains, an important nature reserve home to the rare Siberian tiger
- Grand Canal of China
- Great Wall of China
- Silk Road, abandoned cities along this famous ancient trading route
- Huangshan, Anhui
- Mount Jiuhua, Anhui
- Mount Tianzhu, Anhui
- Forbidden City, Beijing, once the center of the 'Chinese imperial universe' and off-limits to the masses – now open to all
- Summer Palace, Beijing
- Temple of Heaven, Beijing
- Dazu Rock Carvings, Chongqing
- Three Gorges, Chongqing and Hubei
- Gulangyu Island, Fujian
- Mogao Caves, Dunhuang, Gansu these 1,000-year-old man-made caves on the old Silk Road contain some of China's most impressive Buddhist heritage
- Kuling town, Jiujiang, located on top of Mount Lu, a former summer resort for European settlers in southern China
- Li River, Guangxi, where boat trips are taken to see the contorted peaks that have been immortalized in Chinese scroll paintings
- Caohai Lake, Guizhou, where many experience being punted along this shallow lake to see many of China's varied birdlife
- Harbin International Ice and Snow Sculpture Festival, Harbin, Heilongjiang, where extravagant and bizarre sculptures can be seen from life-size ice castles with rainbow lighting to fantastical snowy tableaux
- Yabuli Ski Resort, Heilongjiang, the country's largest ski resort where many Chinese take their skiing holiday
- Longmen Grottoes, a parade of Buddhist figurines and reliefs, near Luoyang, Henan
- Wudang Mountains, Hubei
- Old Yalu Bridge, Dandong, Liaoning, a half-demolished bridge to North Korea remains an important relic of the Korean War.
- Terracotta Army, Xi'an, Shaanxi, the former ancient capital, these 2,200-year-old life-size soldiers guard the tomb of China's first emperor.
- Confucius Mansion, Qufu, Shandong, home to nearly eighty generations of the great sage's clan
- Mount Tai (or Tai Shan), Shandong, a holy peak home to immaculate temples and pavilions
- The Bund, Shanghai, an elegant parade along the Huangpu River of colonial architecture juxtaposed with Shanghai's skyscrapers
- The Hanging Temple at Mount Heng, Shanxi is a temple clinging to a precipice and a series of grottoes containing a panoply of Buddhist statuary
- Yungang Grottoes, near Datong, Shanxi, a renowned Buddhist site
- Jiuzhaigou Valley, Sichuan
- Leshan Giant Buddha, Sichuan, the world's largest carved Buddha
- Mount Emei, Sichuan
- Mount Qingcheng, Sichuan
- Potala Palace, Lhasa, Tibet originally built by King Songtsän Gampo in 637 to greet his bride Princess Wencheng of the Tang dynasty
- Xishuangbanna Dai Autonomous Prefecture, Yunnan, home to one of China's most unique minorities – the Dai people
- West Lake, Hangzhou, Zhejiang

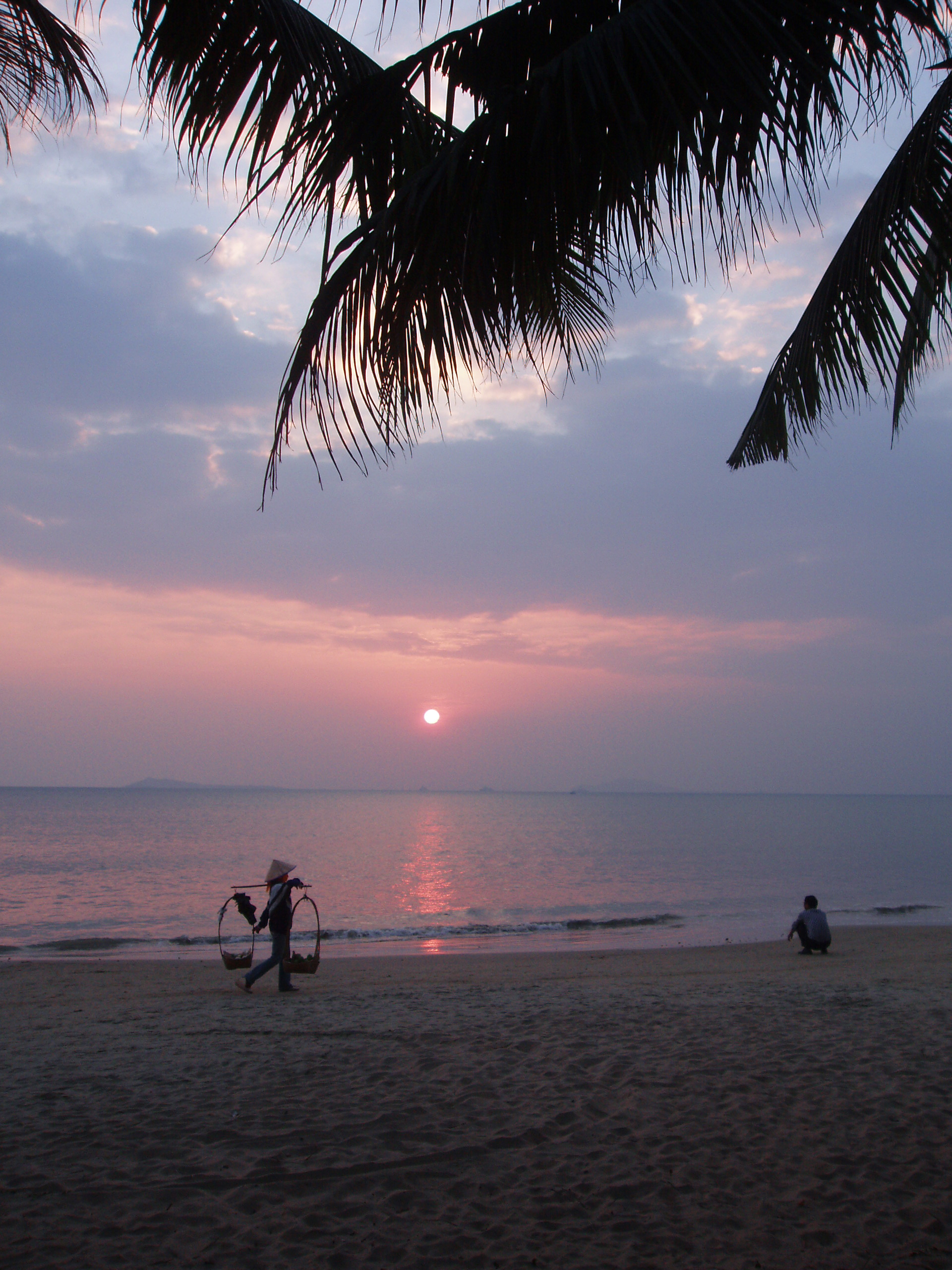
Sunset at Sanya Bay, Hainan

== Tourist resources ==
Tourist resources in China can be divided into three main groups: natural sites, historical and cultural sites, and folk customs. China has 55 World Heritage Sites, the second largest in the world after Italy, which has 58.

=== Natural sites ===
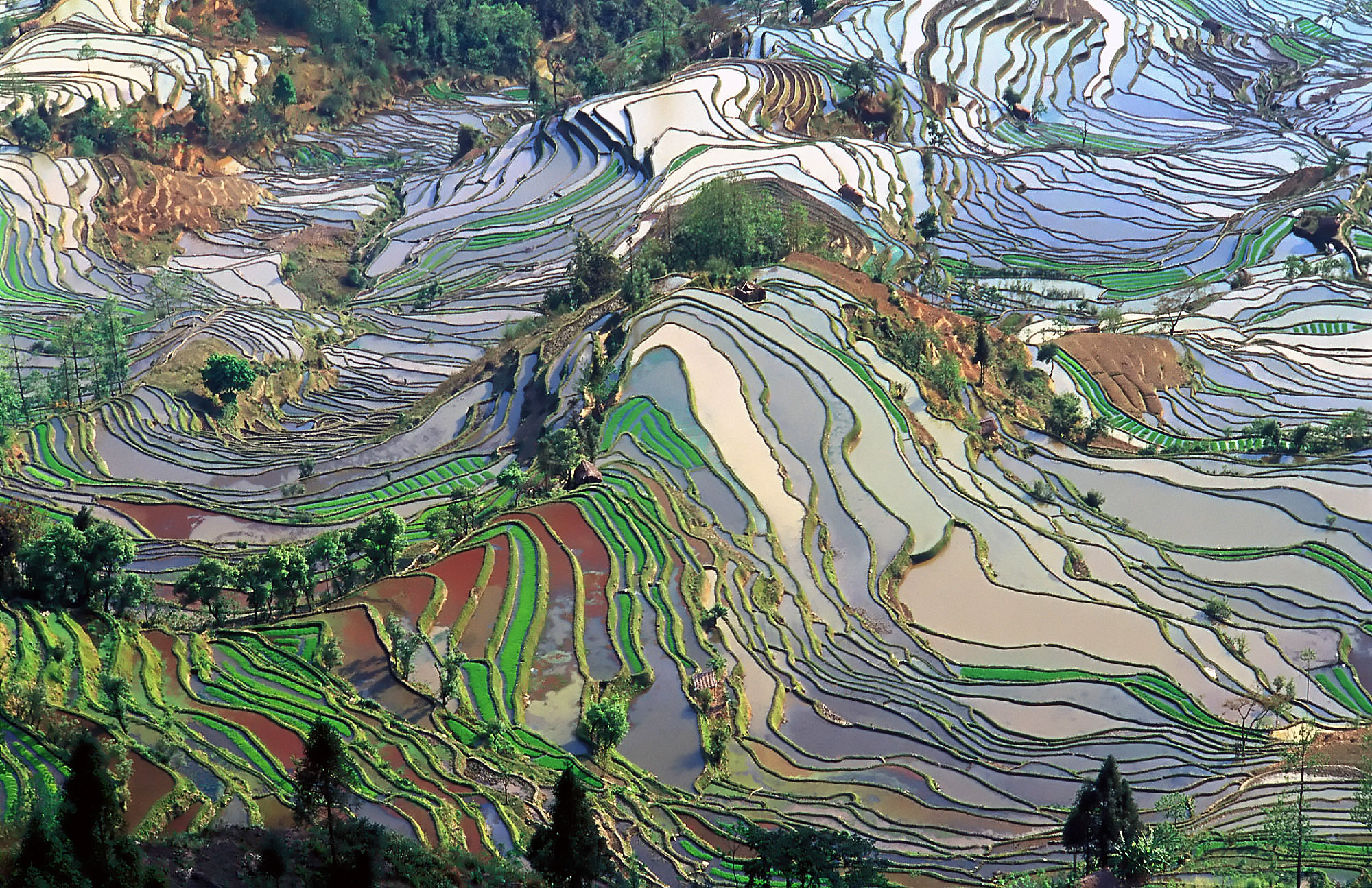
The terraced rice paddies of Yuanyang County, Yunnan

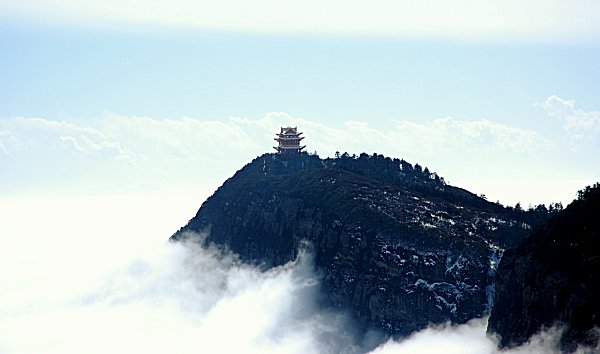
Mount Emei, Sichuan

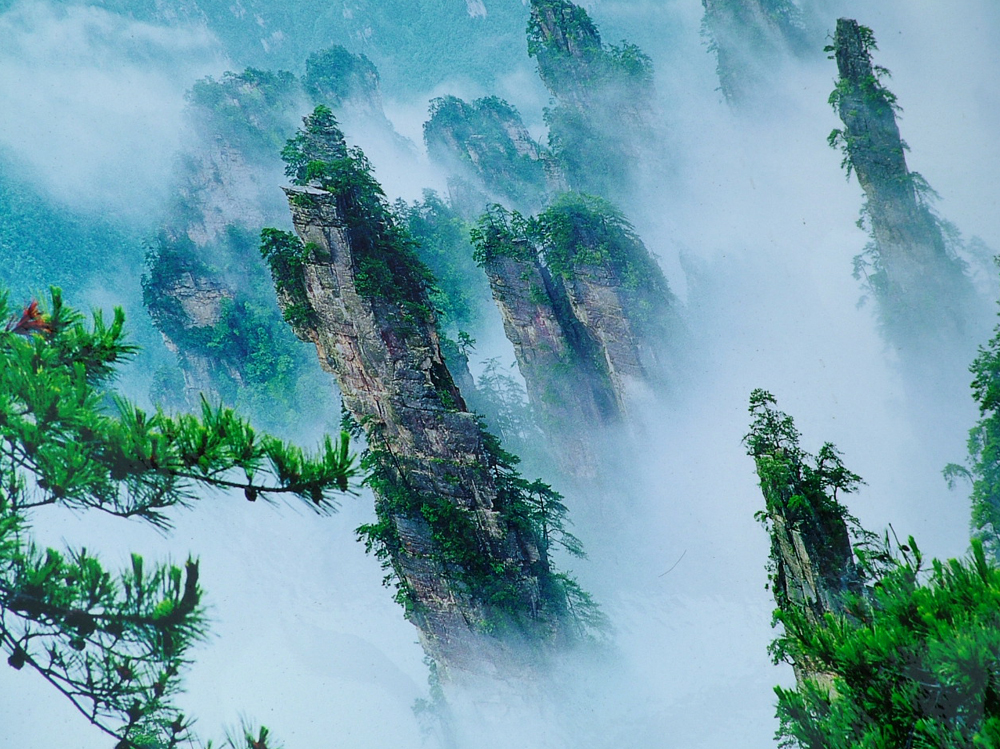
Zhang jia jie, Hunan

China's mountains, lakes, valleys, caves and waterfalls include:

Mount Tai (Tai Shan) in the east, Mount Hengshan in the south, Mount Hua in the west, Mount Hengshan in the north, and Mount Song in the center of China have been called the Five Sacred Mountains since antiquity. The Taishan massif, which snakes through central Shandong, is admired by Chinese as paramount among them. Another mountain celebrated for its beauty is Huangshan in southern Anhui, known for its graceful pines, unusual rocks, cloud seas and hot springs.

Jiuzhaigou, Huangguoshu Waterfall, and Guilin are all located in southwestern China. Jiuzhaigou in northern Sichuan is a beautiful "fairyland valley" running over 40 km through snow-covered mountains, lakes, waterfalls, and forest. The Huangguoshu Waterfalls in Guizhou are a group of waterfalls, 18 above-ground and four below, which can be heard from five km away. The Li River in Guangxi Zhuang Autonomous Region winds its way through karst peaks for 82 km between Guilin and Yangshuo.

On the plateau in Northern China are many lakes. The Tianchi (Heavenly Pool) in the Tianshan Mountains in Xinjiang Autonomous Region is 1,980 meters above sea level. This 105-m-deep lake is crystal clear, the high mountains surrounding it carpeted with green grass and colorful flowers.

Along the Three Gorges of the Yangtze River are many scenic spots and historical sites; the Qutang Gorge, the Wu Gorge, and the Xiling Gorge, which has shoals, reefs, and fast-flowing water. The Lesser Three Gorges have vegetation along water that is clear. The Three Gorges Dam built here is a major hydro-power project in China.

=== Historical and cultural sites ===
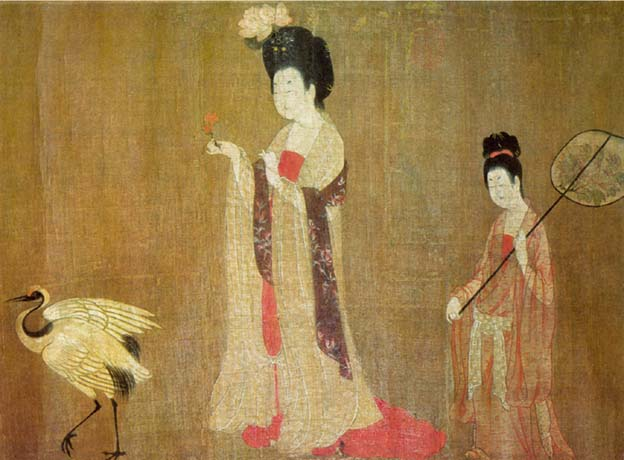
Beauties Wearing Flowers, by Zhou Fang, 8th century

China's long history has left many cultural relics and the title of "China Top Tourist City" has gone to the first group of 54 cities. The Great Wall, a symbol of the Chinese nation, is also a prime example of historical sites that have become major tourist attractions. As the greatest defense-structure project in the history of human civilization, it dates back more than 2,000 years ago to the Spring and Autumn and the Warring States periods – huge in its scale and grandeur. There are more than ten sections of the Great Wall open to tourists, including the passes, blockhouses and beacon towers at Badaling in Beijing, Laolongtou in Hebei and Jiayuguan Pass in Gansu.

Grottoes filled with precious murals and sculptures are concentrated along the ancient Silk Road in Gansu. The best known are the Mogao Caves, a "treasure house of oriental art", with 492 caves with murals and statues on the cliff faces. There are 45,000 sq m of murals and over 2,100 colorful statues, all of high artistry. In the south, grotto art is represented in Sichuan by the Leshan Giant Buddha, carved into a cliff face. Seventy-one meters high and 28 meters wide, it is the largest sitting Buddha in stone, showing the carving skill of ancient craftsmen.

The Shaolin Temple in Henan, the birthplace of Chinese Zen Buddhism and famous for its Shaolin Kung Fu martial arts, dates back to 495 AD. Here can be seen the Ming period Five-Hundred-Arhats Mural and Qing period Shaolin kungfu paintings. In Hubei, the beautiful Wudang Mountain, with 72 peaks covering an area of 30 km^{2} (12 sq mi), form a sacred site of Taoism, which preserves one of China's most complete and largest-scale ancient Taoist architecture. In western Sichuan, Mount Emei, dotted with ancient Buddhist temples and structures, is one of China's four sacred Buddhist mountains｡

South of the Yangtze River, Suzhou and Hangzhou, long known as "paradise on earth", are crisscrossed with rivers, lakes, bridges, fields and villages, as beautiful as paintings. Today's well-preserved ancient cities includes that of Pingyao in central Shanxi, but was also the site of the Neolithic era Yangshao and Longshan cultures, 5,000 to 6,000 years ago. Ancient Lijiang in Yunnan is not only the center of Dongba culture of the Nakhi ethnic group but also a meeting place for the cultures of Han, Tibetan and Bai ethnicities. Built in the Song dynasty, this city has many stone bridges, stone memorial arches and dwelling houses, which provide precious materials for architectural history and can be called a "living museum of ancient dwelling houses."

=== Folk customs ===
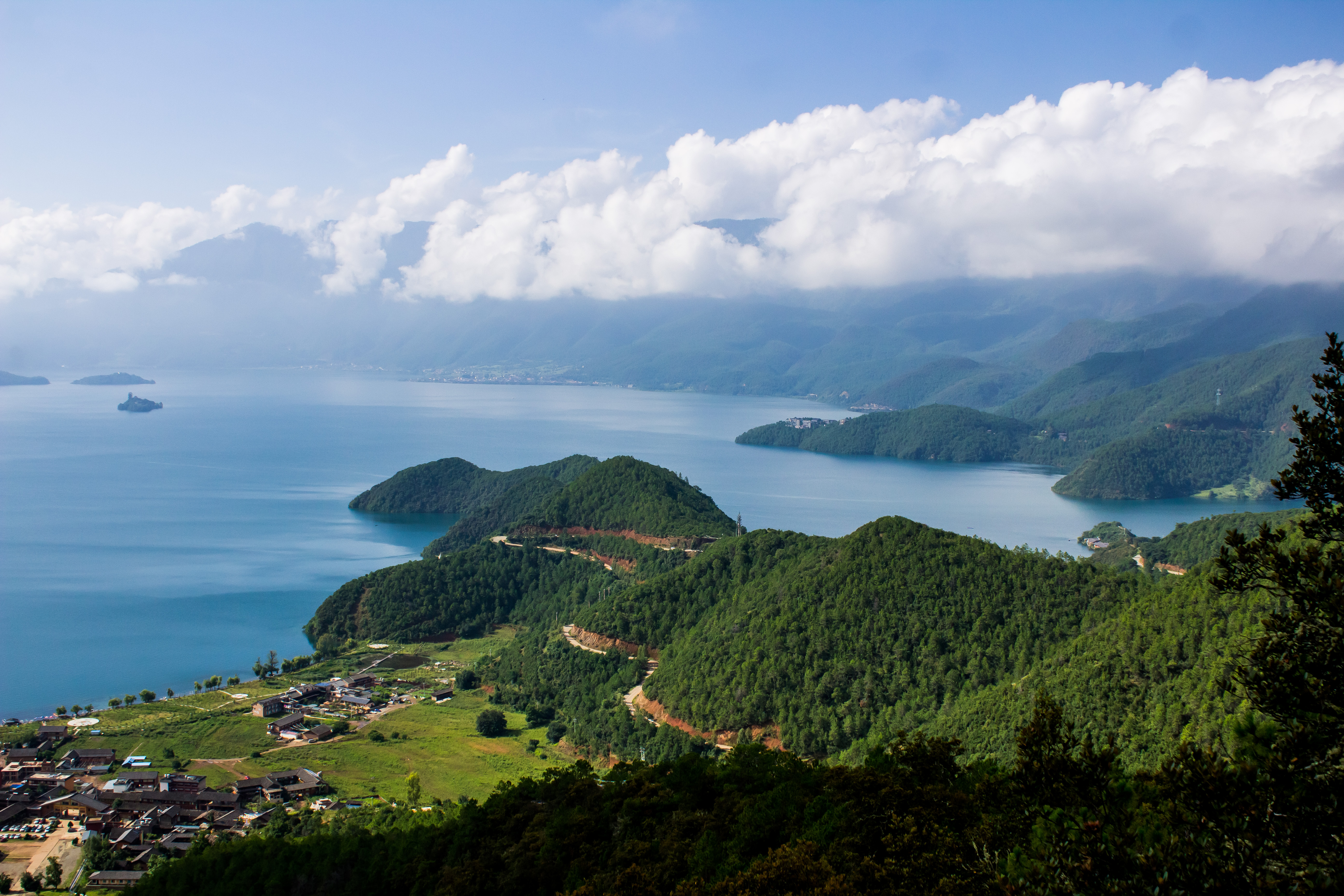
Lugu Lake, Yunnan

"March Street" celebrated by the Bai people in Dali, Yunnan, is associated with the Buddhist Goddess of Mercy suppressing a devil to help the Bai people. It became traditional to burn incense and offer sacrifices to commemorate her virtues every year and the festival has become a major annual gathering for Bai commercial, cultural and sports activities.

The Water-Sprinkling Festival of the Dai ethnic group in Xishuangbanna, Yunnan, is a lively occasion taking place in the spring. People chase and pour water (a symbol of good luck and happiness) over each other, among other activities such as dragon boat racing and peacock dance.

Lugu Lake between Sichuan and Yunnan has become a tourist destination following the building of a new highway giving access to this area. The matriarchal society of the 30,000 local Mosuo people is noted for its "no marriage" traditions and is called the last women's kingdom on the earth. Mosuo women, local dugout canoes and undulating singing style are considered unique to Lugu Lake.

== Tourist themes ==
The China National Tourism Administration promotes a tourist theme every year; 1992 was "Friendly Sightseeing Year." Then came "Landscape Tour", "Tour of Cultural Relics and Historical Sites", "Folk Customs Tour", "Holiday Tour", and "Ecological Environment Tour." From 2000 to 2004, the themes were "Century Year", "Sports and Health of China", "Folk Arts of China", and "Culinary Kingdom of China", and "Catch the Lifestyle."

The themes for 2005 were "China Travel Year" and "Beijing 2008 – Welcome to China." In order to strengthen exchange and cooperation with the international tourism industry, the China National Travel Administration is planning a series of related events, including the Shanghai-hosted "2005 International Tourism Fair of China", the Beijing-hosted 2005 annual meeting of the Federation of Travel Agencies of France, and "the 2005 China-Australia Tourism Symposium."

Since 2013, all regions in China have had tourism publicity events under the "Beautiful China" umbrella, but with a different theme for each area. The year 2018 was declared as "Beautiful China – Year of Integrated Tourism" while 2017 was declared as "Beautiful China – Year of Silk Road Tourism".

== Tourist services ==
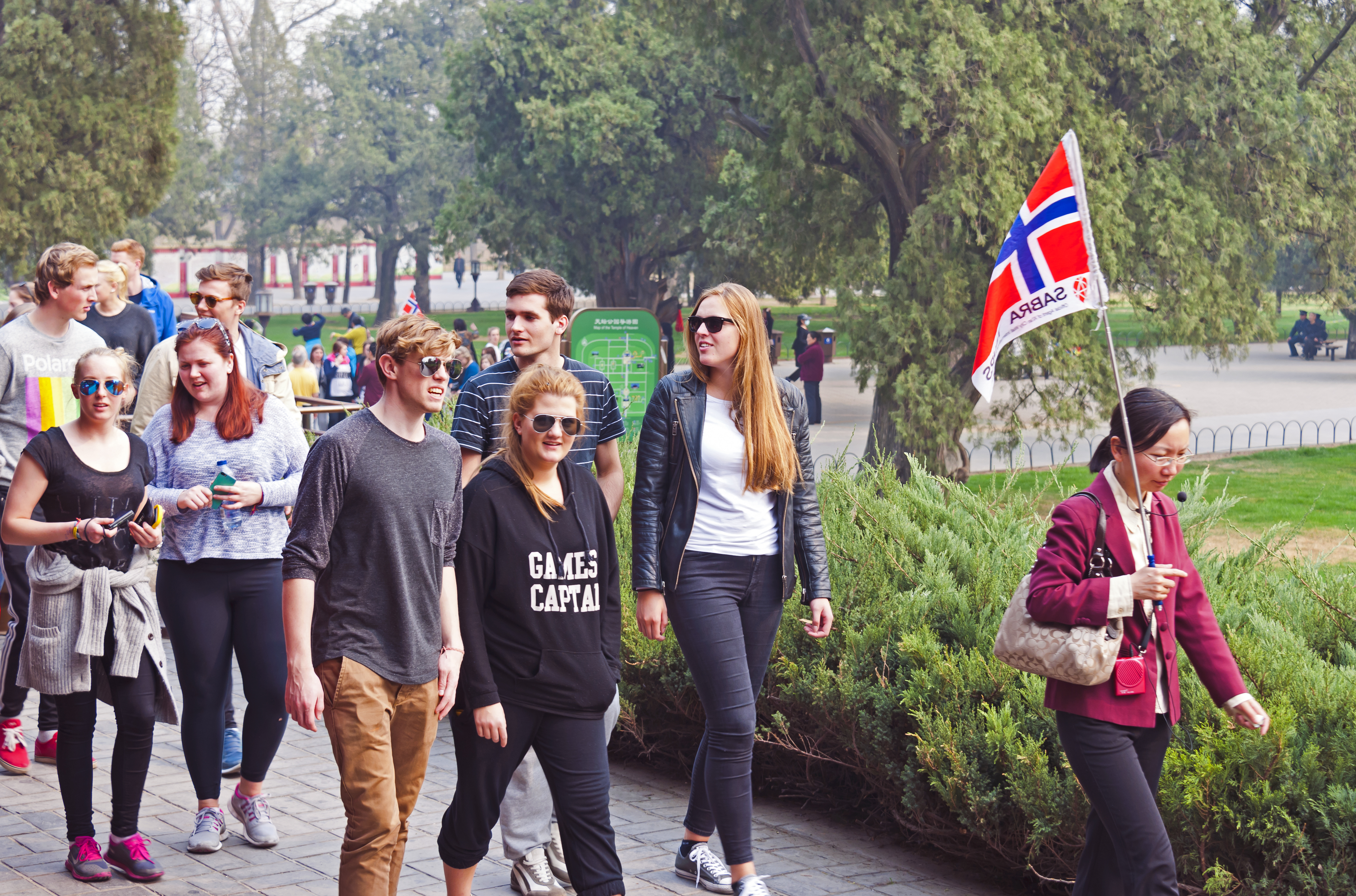
A guide leads a group of Norwegian tourists to the Temple of Heaven in Beijing

The fast development of China's transportation infrastructure provides wide-ranging travel for domestic and overseas tourists. Throughout China many hotels and restaurants have been constructed, renovated or expanded to satisfy all levels of requirement, including many with five or six-star ratings.

China has regulated international travel agencies. On June 12, 2003, the China National Tourism Administration and the Ministry of Commerce jointly issued Interim Regulations on the Establishment of Foreign-funded or Wholly Foreign-owned Travel Agencies.

The Chinese online tourism market, including for outbound tourism, is concentrated in major online service providers including Ctrip, Feizhu, Mafengwo, and Dazhongdianping.

== See also ==
- Tourism in Hong Kong
- Visa policy of China
