= Peng, Chengdu =

Peng 彭镇 Pengzhen
- Town
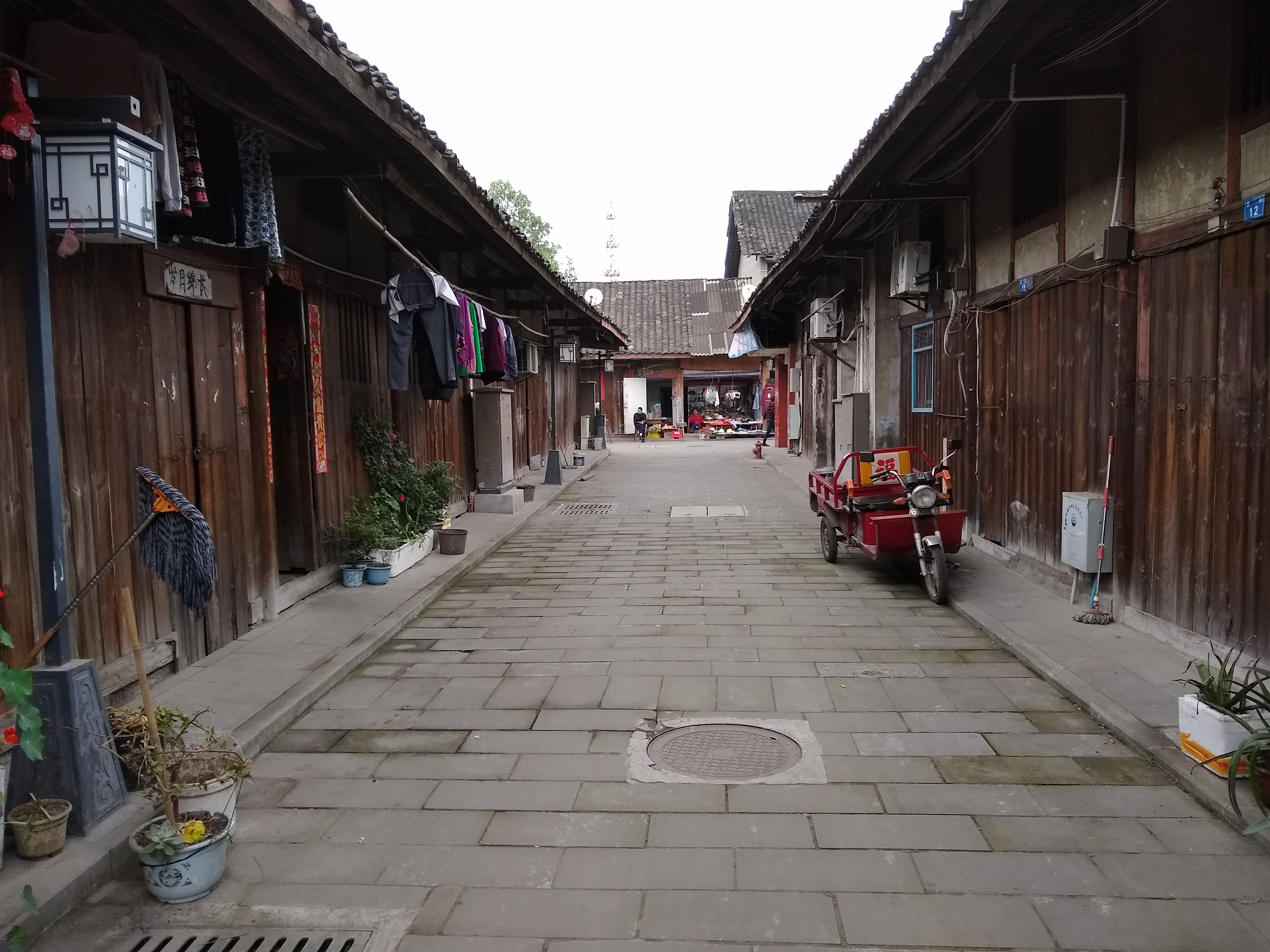
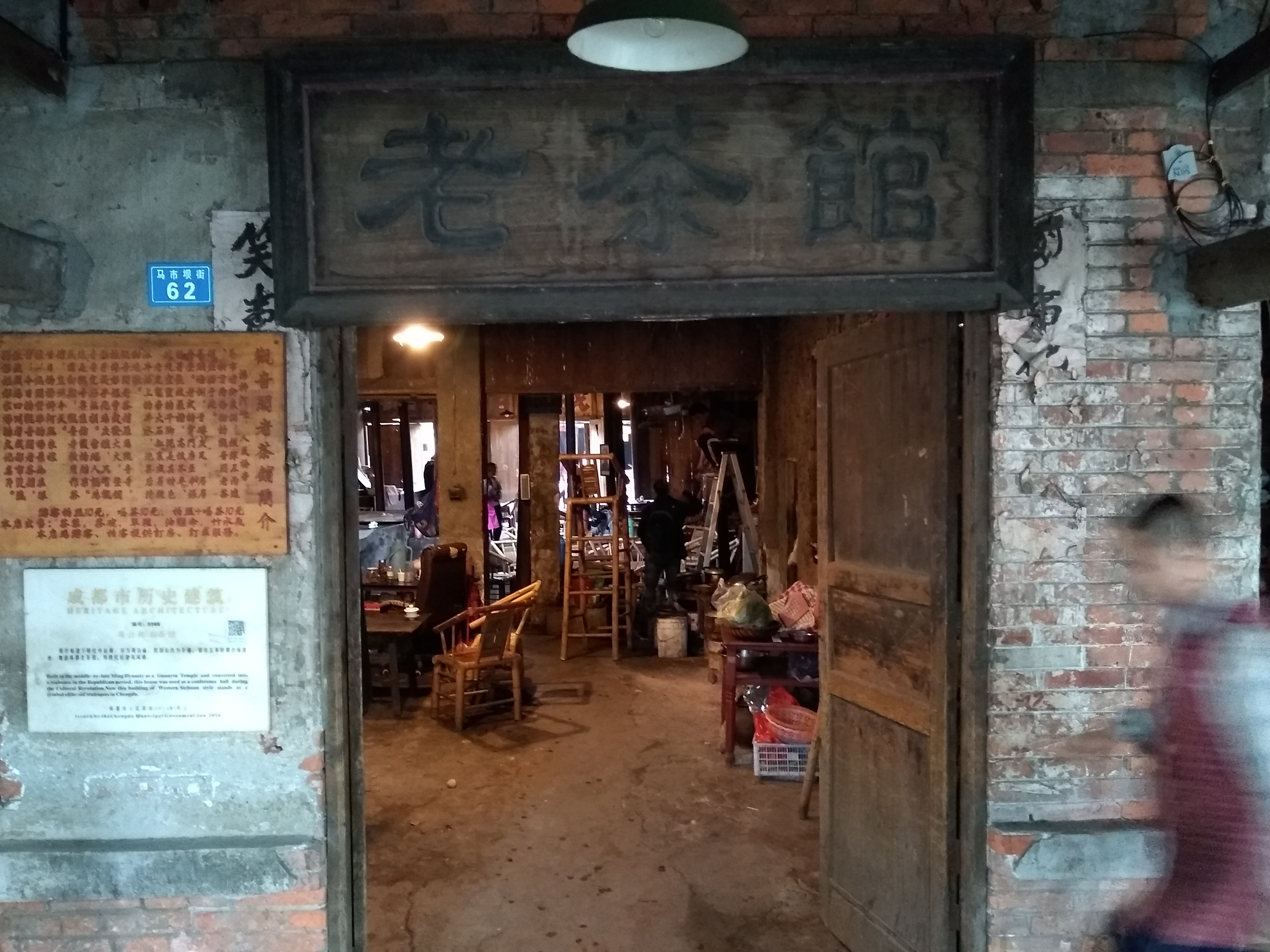
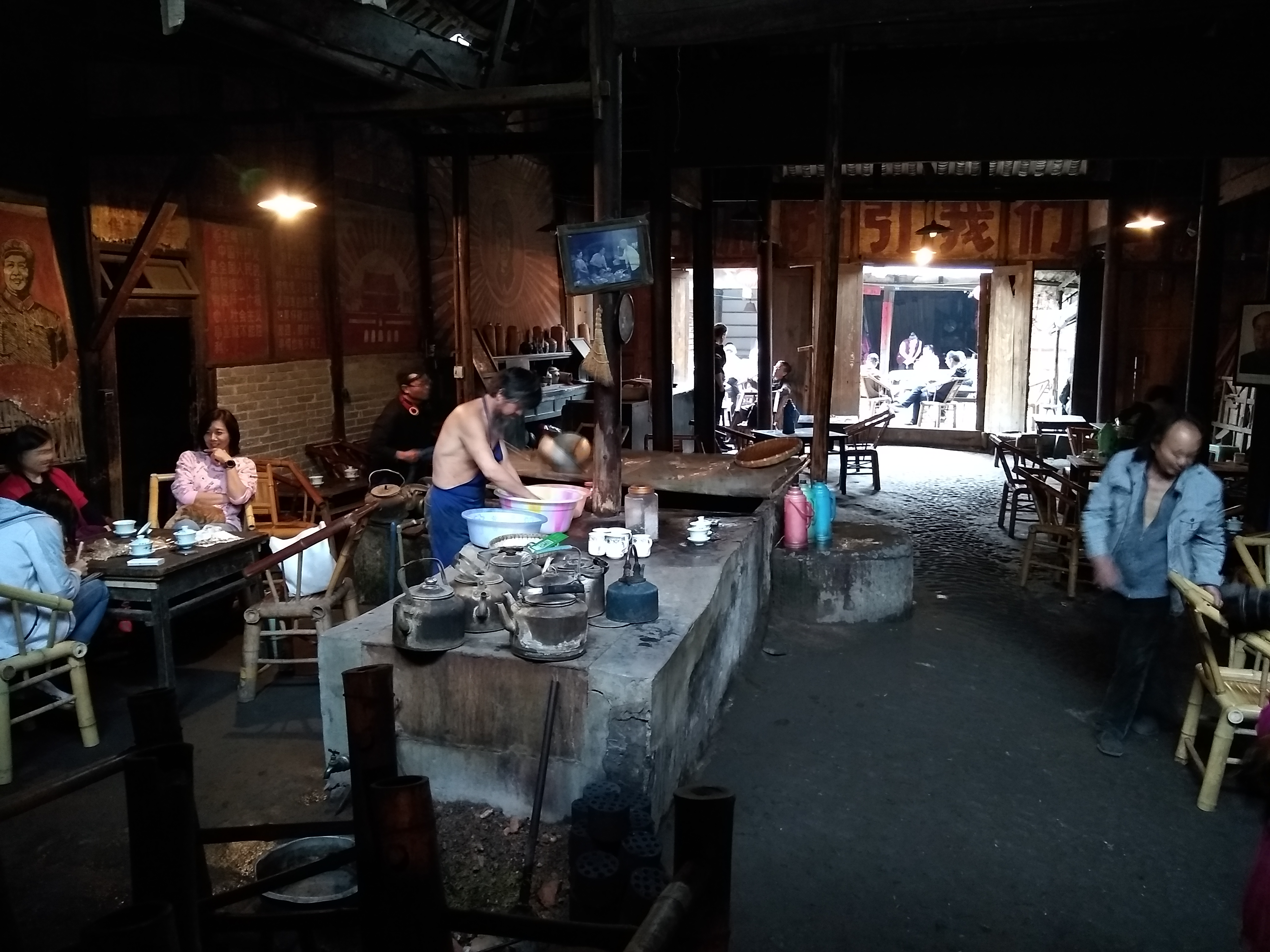
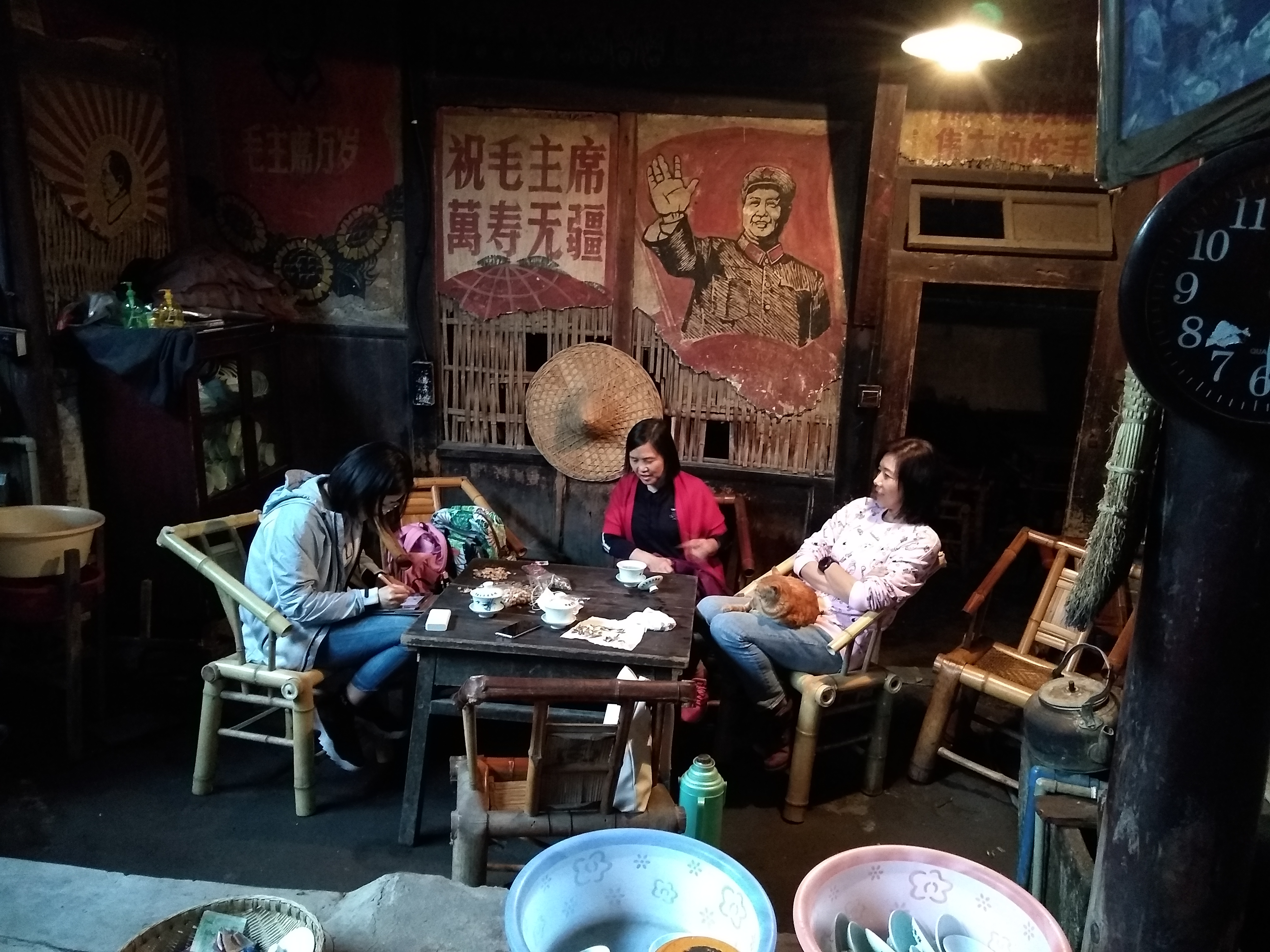
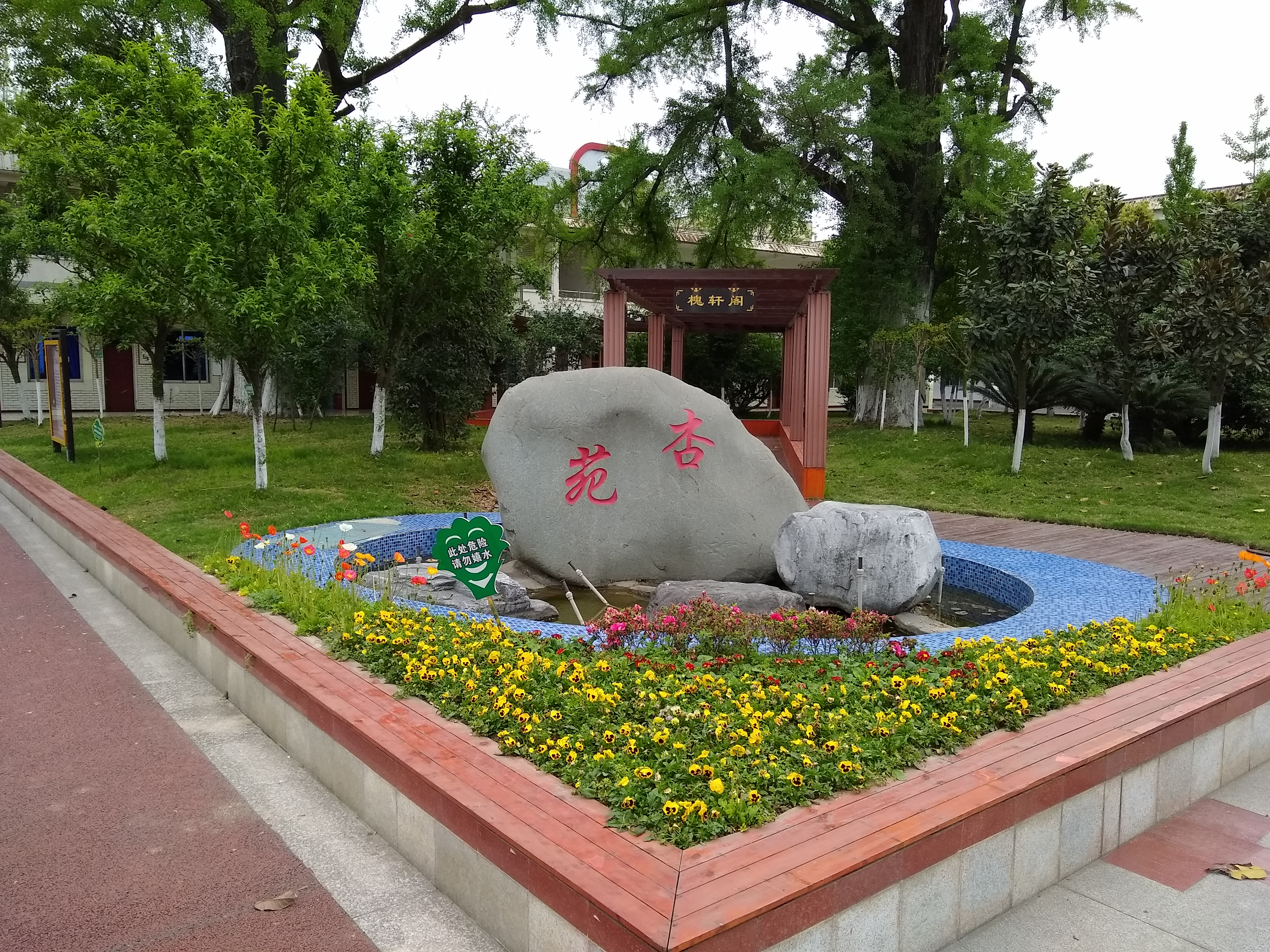
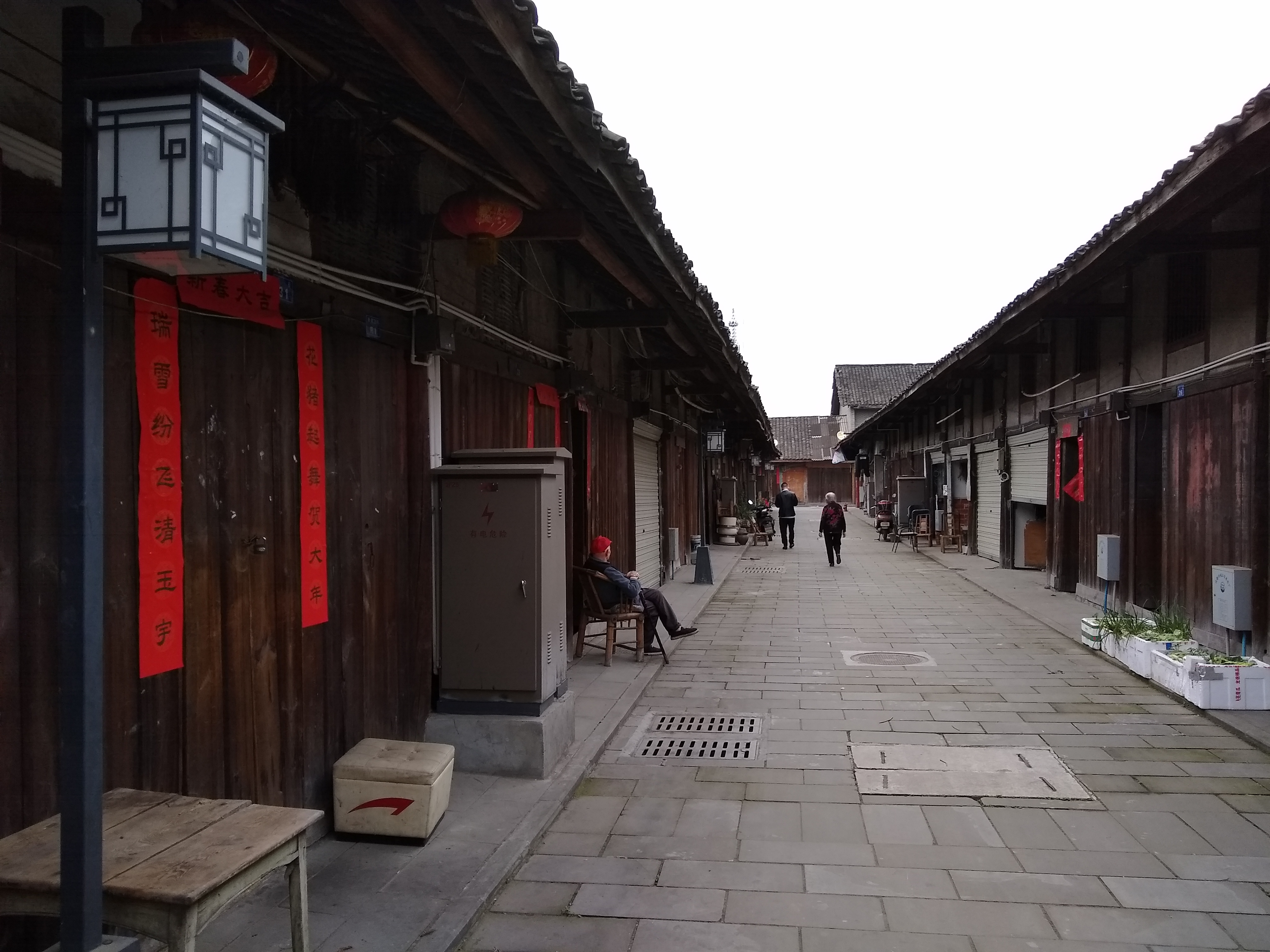

- Location in Sichuan
- Coordinates: 30°35′00″N 103°52′30″E
- Country: People's Republic of China
- Province: Sichuan
- Sub-provincial city: Chengdu
- District: Shuangliu

Area
  - Total: 36.42 km^{2} (14.06 sq mi)
- Elevation: 496 m (1,627 ft)

Population (2018)
  - Total: 43,005
- Time zone: UTC+8 (China Standard)
- Postal code: 610200
- Area code: (0)28

Peng, or Pengzhen (simplified Chinese: 彭镇; traditional Chinese: 彭鎮; pinyin: Péng Zhèn), is a town under the jurisdiction of Shuangliu District, Chengdu, Sichuan Province, China. It is located 5 km (3.1 mi) west of central Shuangliu, 12 kilometres (7.5 mi) west of Chengdu Shuangliu International Airport, 22 km (14 mi) west of Chengdu's city government center (Chinese: 成都市政府), and 24 km (15 mi) southwest of Tianfu Square (Chinese: 天府广场), Chengdu's traditional city center. The town spans an area of 36.42 square kilometres (14.06 mi^{2}), and has a hukou population of 43,005 as of 2018.

== History ==
The ancient name of Pengzhen was Yongfengchang (Chinese: 永丰场). It was built in the Yongle period of the Ming Dynasty. It was destroyed by war in the early Qing Dynasty and rebuilt in the 28th year of Qianlong (1763). Because a branch of the Danleng Peng Duanshu (Chinese: 丹棱彭端淑) family migrated here, it was named Pengjiachang (Chinese: 彭家场; lit. 'Peng family place').

After the Chinese Communist Party came to power in 1949, Pengjia Town of the Third District (Chinese: 彭家镇属第三区) was established. In 1953, Pengjia Town (Chinese: 彭家镇) was divided into Pengzhen and Pengzhen Township (Chinese: 彭镇乡). In 1958, Pengzhen’s organizational structure was dissolved, and Pengzhen Township, Ca'er Township (Chinese: 擦耳乡), Hongshi Township (Chinese: 红石乡) and Ganzi Township (Chinese: 柑梓乡) were merged to form the Dongfeng People’s Commune (Chinese: 东风人民公社).

Pengzhen Township was re-established in 1983. The name reverted to Pengzhen in 1984. In 1992, Pengzhen and Ganzi Township merged, and the merged township is still named Pengzhen. In December 2019, the town of Jinqiao (金桥镇) was dissolved and its administrative area was placed under the jurisdiction of Pengzhen.

== Government ==
The Pengzhen People's Government town hall is located at No. 70, Section 3, Jiaotong Road (Chinese: 交通路三段70号).

== Administrative divisions ==
Peng is divided into sixteen residential communities and six administrative villages.

The town's sixteen residential communities are:

- Pengjiachang Residential Community (Chinese: 彭家场社区)
- Randeng Residential Community (Chinese: 燃灯社区)
- Yangping Residential Community (Chinese: 羊坪社区)
- Guangrong Residential Community (Chinese: 光荣社区)
- Jinwan Residential Community (Chinese: 金湾社区)
- Qiyang Residential Community (Chinese: 歧阳社区)
- Ganzi Residential Community (Chinese: 柑梓社区)
- Xingfu Residential Community (Chinese: 兴福社区)
- Muxi Residential Community (Chinese: 木樨社区)
- Hongshi Residential Community (Chinese: 红石社区)
- Kunshan Residential Community (Chinese: 昆山社区)
- Xin'an Residential Community (Chinese: 新安社区)
- Lianyu Residential Community (Chinese: 鲢鱼社区)
- Heshui Residential Community (Chinese: 合水社区)
- Bushi Residential Community (Chinese: 布市社区)
- Jinqiao Residential Community (Chinese: 金桥社区)

The town's six administrative villages are:

- Minjiang Village (Chinese: 岷江村)
- Yonghe Village (Chinese: 永和村)
- Jinma Village (Chinese: 金马村)
- Jinhe Village (Chinese: 金河村)
- Linjiang Village (Chinese: 临江村)
- Zhoudu Village (Chinese: 舟渡村)

== In popular culture ==
Peng, including the Peng Old Teahouse (simplified Chinese: 老茶馆; traditional Chinese: 老茶館; pinyin: lǎo chá guǎn), was used as a principal filming location in the 2020 Chinese language film "Interloper" (Chinese: 老七; pinyin: lǎo qī; lit. 'Old Seven').
