= Dongsheng Subdistrict, Shuangliu District =

Dongsheng Subdistrict 东升街道
- Subdistrict
- Location in Sichuan
- Coordinates: 30°34′10″N 103°55′41″E
- Country: People's Republic of China
- Province: Sichuan
- Sub-provincial city: Chengdu
- District: Shuangliu
- Elevation: 496 m (1,627 ft)
- Time zone: UTC+8 (China Standard)
- Area code: 0028

Dongsheng Subdistrict (simplified Chinese: 东升街道; traditional Chinese: 東升街道; pinyin: Dōngshēng Jiēdào; lit. 'east rise') is a subdistrict in and the seat of Shuangliu District, Chengdu, Sichuan, People's Republic of China, situated in the immediate vicinity of Chengdu Shuangliu International Airport. As of 2011, it has 20 residential communities (社区) under its administration.

== See also ==
- List of township-level divisions of Sichuan
