= Wan'an, Chengdu =

Wan'an 万安街道
- Subdistrict
- Location in Sichuan
- Coordinates: 30°29′24″N 104°6′37″E
- Country: People's Republic of China
- Province: Sichuan
- Prefecture-level city: Chengdu
- District: Shuangliu District
- Time zone: UTC+8 (China Standard)

Wan'an (simplified Chinese: 万安; traditional Chinese: 萬安; pinyin: Wàn'ān) is a town under the administration of Shuangliu District, Chengdu, Sichuan, China. As of 2018, it has 12 residential communities and 2 villages under its administration.

== See also ==
- List of township-level divisions of Sichuan
