= Shuangliu, Chengdu =

District of Chengdu, Sichuan, China

Shuangliu 双流区
- District
- District of Shuangliu, City of Chengdu
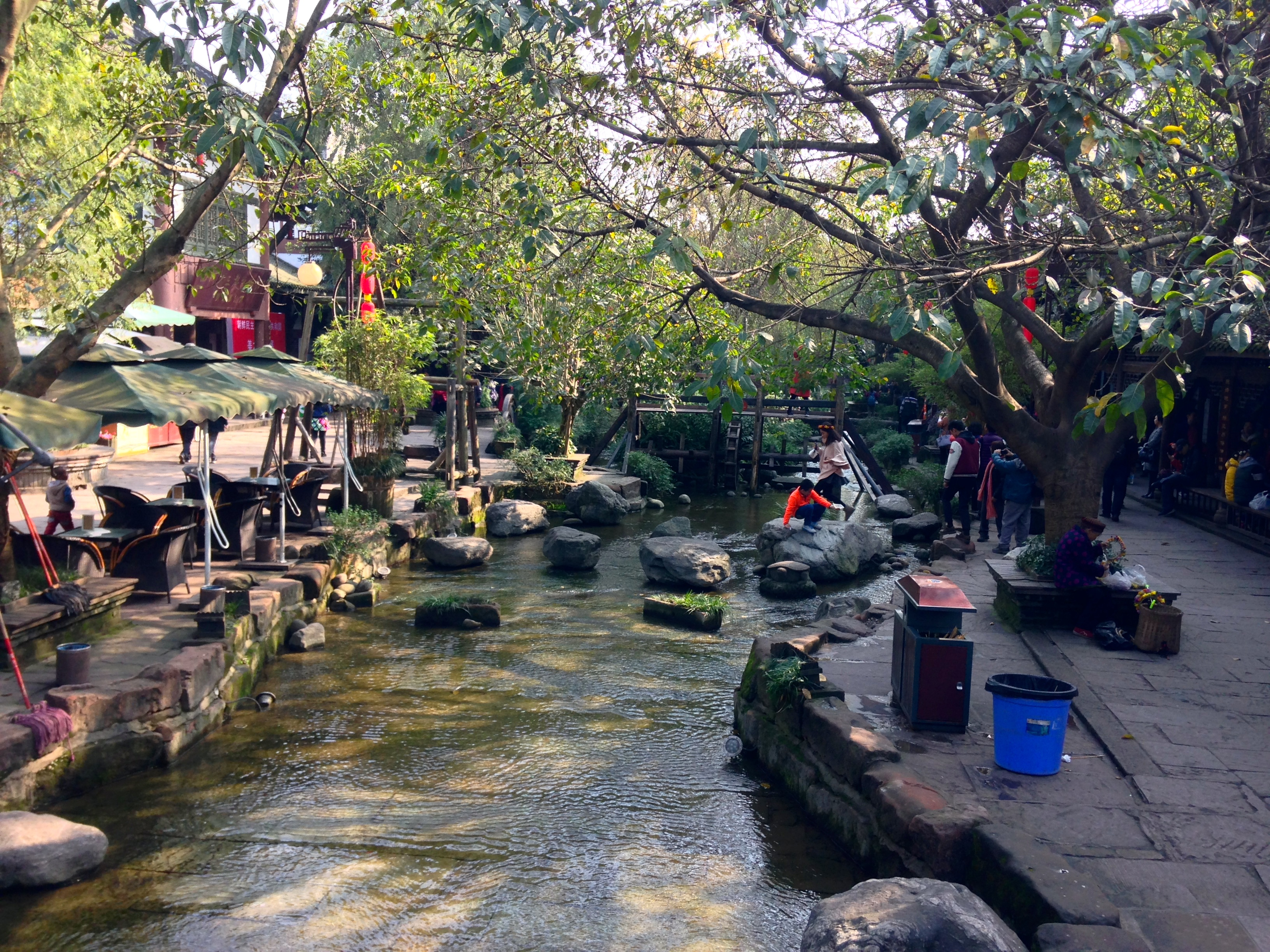
- Shuangliu district scenery

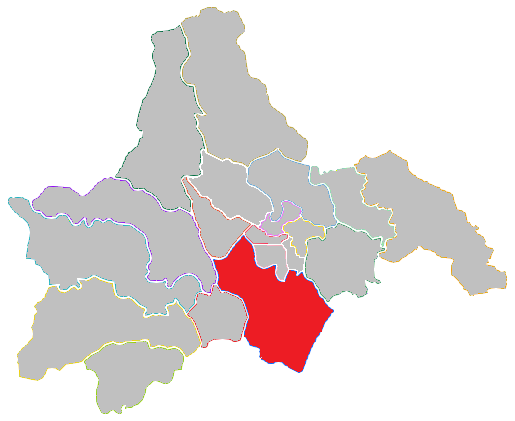
- Location of Shuangliu in Chengdu

- Location in Sichuan
- Coordinates: 30°34′08″N 103°55′34″E
- Country: China
- Province: Sichuan
- Sub-provincial city: Chengdu
- District seat: Dongsheng Subdistrict

Area
  - Total: 1,032 km^{2} (398 sq mi)

Population (2020)
  - Total: 2,659,829
  - Density: 2,577/km^{2} (6,675/sq mi)
- Time zone: UTC+8 (China Standard)
- Postal code: 6102XX

Shuangliu District (Chinese: 双流区; pinyin: Shuāngliú Qū; lit. 'double flow district') is a suburban district of the City of Chengdu, Sichuan, China. The district covers an area of 1,065 square kilometres (411 mi^{2}), and has a population of approximately 2,659,829 as of 2020. It is the home of Chengdu Shuangliu International Airport, the fourth busiest airport in China. Shuangliu District is rapidly being urbanized by the growth of Chengdu and the airport's recent expansion. The district is bordered by the prefecture-level cities of Ziyang to the southeast and Meishan to the south.

== History ==
The area of present-day Shuangliu District was home to the ancient city of Guangdu, which served as the capital of a number of ancient clans. The area of present-day Shuangliu District was incorporated into the Qin state in 316 BCE as Shu Commandery. In 127 BCE, the area was administered as Guangdu County (Chinese: 广都县). In 9 CE, the county was renamed to Jiudu Pavilion (Chinese: 就都亭), and in 58 CE, its named was reverted to Guangdu County. In 352 CE, the area was reorganized as Ningshu Commandery. In 559 CE, under the Northern Zhou, Ningshu Commandery was abolished and replaced by Shu Commandery and Guangdu County was once again restored. In 601, under the Sui dynasty, Shuangliu County was established within Shu Commandery.

On March 1, 2016, Shuangliu County was upgraded to Shuangliu District.

== Government ==
=== District government ===
As a district, Shuangliu is headed by a Party Committee Secretary (simplified Chinese: 书记; traditional Chinese: 書記; pinyin: shūjì). On May 31, 2018, Han Yi was appointed as the Party Committee Secretary of the district. Since December 19, 2016, Chen Lin has served as the Director of the Standing Committee of the Shuangliu's People's Congress, the district's legislative body.

=== Administrative divisions ===
As of 2020, Shuangliu District is divided into 15 subdistricts and 4 towns.

==== Subdistricts ====
The 15 subdistricts of Shuangliu District are as follows:

- Dongsheng Subdistrict (Chinese: 东升街道)
- Xihanggang Subdistrict (Chinese: 西航港街道)
- Huayang Subdistrict (Chinese: 华阳街道)
- Zhonghe Subdistrict (Chinese: 中和街道)
- Jiujiang Subdistrict (Chinese: 九江街道)
- Huangjia Subdistrict (Chinese: 黄甲街道)
- Yixin Subdistrict (Chinese: 怡心街道)
- Wan'an Subdistrict (Chinese: 万安街道)
- Zhengxing Subdistrict (Chinese: 正兴街道)
- Xinglong Subdistrict (Chinese: 兴隆街道)
- Jiancha Subdistrict (Chinese: 煎茶街道)
- Xinxing Subdistrict (Chinese: 新兴街道)
- Jitian Subdistrict (Chinese: 籍田街道)
- Taiping Subdistrict (Chinese: 太平街道)
- Yongxing Subdistrict (Chinese: 永兴街道)

==== Towns ====
The 4 towns of Shuangliu District are as follows:

- Peng (Chinese: 彭镇)
- Huanglongxi (Chinese: 黄龙溪镇)
- Yong'an (Chinese: 永安镇)
- Huangshui (Chinese: 黄水镇)

== Demographics ==
As of 2019, the district has an estimated population of 1,396,400, of which, 652,100 are hukou holders. In 2019, the district reported a rate of natural increase of 13.15 per thousand.

== Climate ==
Climate data for Shuangliu, elevation 495 m (1,624 ft), (1991–2020 normals, extremes 1981–2010)
Month	Jan	Feb	Mar	Apr	May	Jun	Jul	Aug	Sep	Oct	Nov	Dec	Year
Record high °C (°F)	18.9 (66.0)	24.0 (75.2)	31.8 (89.2)	32.5 (90.5)	35.2 (95.4)	37.5 (99.5)	37.3 (99.1)	36.6 (97.9)	36.2 (97.2)	30.1 (86.2)	26.2 (79.2)	18.4 (65.1)	37.5 (99.5)
Mean daily maximum °C (°F)	9.8 (49.6)	12.7 (54.9)	17.5 (63.5)	23.3 (73.9)	27.0 (80.6)	28.9 (84.0)	30.6 (87.1)	30.6 (87.1)	26.2 (79.2)	21.3 (70.3)	16.7 (62.1)	11.2 (52.2)	21.3 (70.4)
Daily mean °C (°F)	6.0 (42.8)	8.5 (47.3)	12.6 (54.7)	17.6 (63.7)	21.6 (70.9)	24.2 (75.6)	25.8 (78.4)	25.5 (77.9)	21.9 (71.4)	17.5 (63.5)	12.8 (55.0)	7.5 (45.5)	16.8 (62.2)
Mean daily minimum °C (°F)	3.3 (37.9)	5.5 (41.9)	9.0 (48.2)	13.6 (56.5)	17.6 (63.7)	20.8 (69.4)	22.5 (72.5)	22.1 (71.8)	19.2 (66.6)	15.1 (59.2)	10.2 (50.4)	4.9 (40.8)	13.7 (56.6)
Record low °C (°F)	−4.6 (23.7)	−2.6 (27.3)	−1.8 (28.8)	4.0 (39.2)	6.3 (43.3)	14.2 (57.6)	16.6 (61.9)	16.0 (60.8)	12.2 (54.0)	3.1 (37.6)	0.2 (32.4)	−4.1 (24.6)	−4.6 (23.7)
Average precipitation mm (inches)	8.9 (0.35)	12.4 (0.49)	23.6 (0.93)	47.5 (1.87)	76.8 (3.02)	122.5 (4.82)	238.2 (9.38)	198.8 (7.83)	116.5 (4.59)	43.1 (1.70)	15.9 (0.63)	7.0 (0.28)	911.2 (35.89)
Average precipitation days (≥ 0.1 mm)	7.6	8.0	10.5	13.5	13.8	15.7	17.3	15.7	15.1	14.7	7.5	6.6	146
Average snowy days	1.1	0.4	0	0	0	0	0	0	0	0	0	0.2	1.7
Average relative humidity (%)	82	79	77	76	73	78	83	83	84	83	82	82	80
Mean monthly sunshine hours	38.3	54.7	85.2	116.0	122.1	110.7	122.1	132.9	70.5	54.9	47.7	37.7	992.8
Percentage possible sunshine	12	17	23	30	29	26	29	33	19	16	15	12	22
Source: China Meteorological Administration

== Economy ==
The district reported a GDP of 96.205 billion Yuan for 2019, an 8.8% increase from 2018. The following table shows a breakdown of the district's GDP:

Sector	2019 Value (Yuan)	Percent of 2019 GDP	Percent Increase from 2018
Primary Sector	1.839 billion	1.91%	2.6%
Secondary Sector	31.104 billion	32.33%	8.4%
Tertiary Sector	63.262 billion	65.76%	9.2%
TOTAL	96.205 billion	100.00%	8.8%

The now-defunct China Southwest Airlines had its headquarters on the property of Shuangliu Airport.

== Education ==
=== Colleges and universities ===
Sichuan University's Jiang'an Campus is in the county.

Southwest University for Nationalities maintains a campus near the airport.

=== Primary and secondary schools ===
Junior high school

- Shuangliu Experimental Secondary School
- Tanghu Secondary School
- Shuangliu Foreign Language Secondary School
- Dongsheng 1st Secondary School
- Dongsheng 2nd Secondary School
- Dongsheng 3rd Secondary School
- Léman International School - Chengdu, a K-12 international school, is located in Da'an Village (大安村), Zhengxing Township (正兴镇), Shuangliu County.

Senior high school

- Shuangliu High School
- Tanghu High School
- Shuangliu Foreign Language High School
- Dongsheng 1st High School
- Dongsheng 2nd High School
- Dongsheng 3rd High School

== Transportation ==
=== Road transport ===
The district is served by China National Highway 318.

=== Air transport ===
Shuangliu District is home to the Chengdu Shuangliu International Airport, which, in 2018, saw the fourth largest passenger traffic in China, and the twenty-sixth largest in the world.

== Notable people ==
- Ye Guangfu (b. 1980), People's Liberation Army Astronaut Corps astronaut
