= Huanglongxi =

Town in Sichuan, China

Huanglongxi 黄龙溪镇
- Town
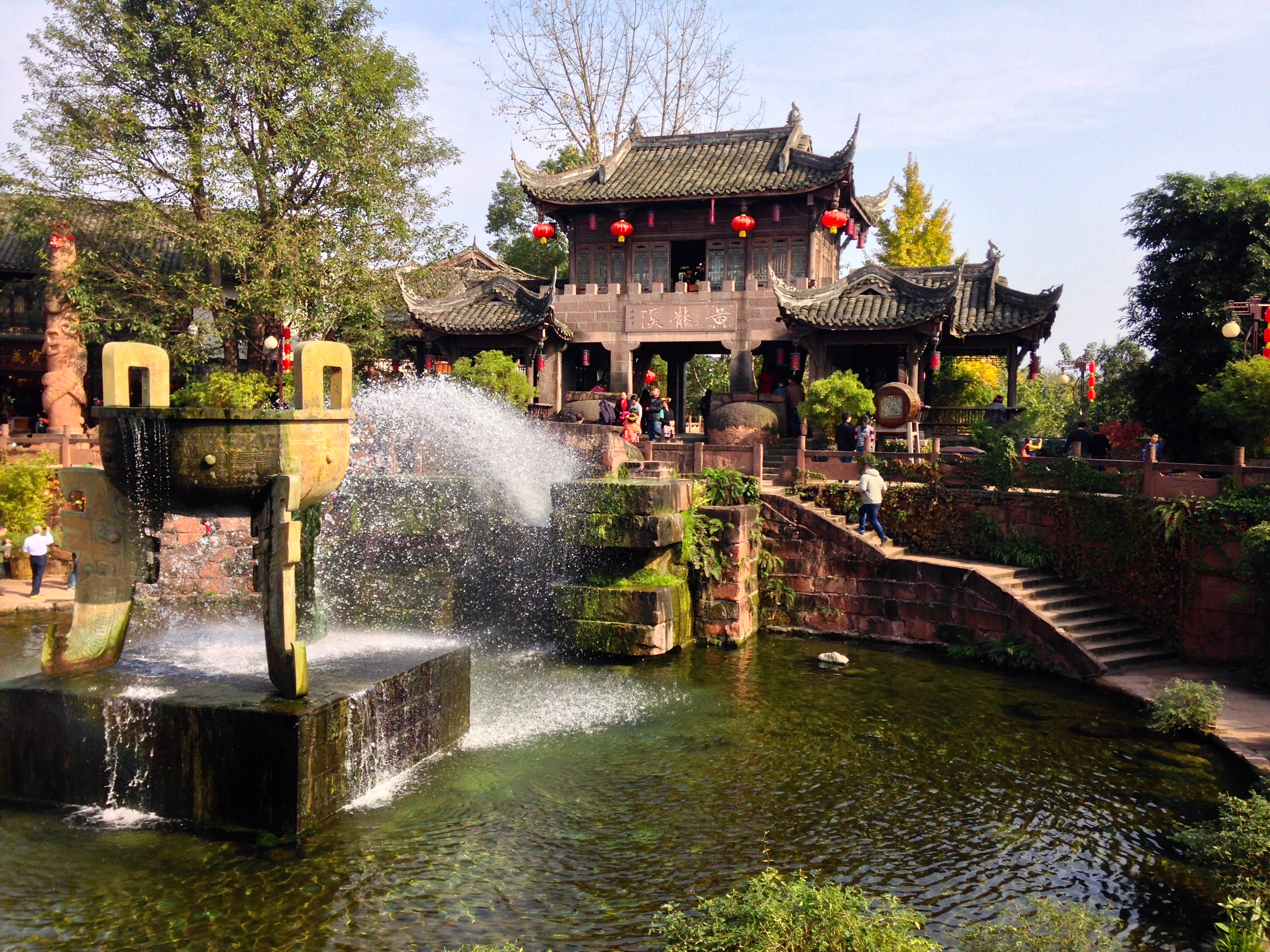
- West Gate of Huanglongxi Ancient Town

- Location in Sichuan
- Coordinates: 30.3178°N 103.9707°E
- Country: China
- Province: Sichuan
- Sub-provincial city: Chengdu
- District: Shuangliu
- Time zone: UTC+8 (China Standard)

Huanglongxi (simplified Chinese: 黄龙溪镇; traditional Chinese: 黃龍溪鎮) is a historic Chinese town located in Chengdu, Sichuan. It is named after the Huanglong Stream, which flows through the town.

The town is over 1,700 years old and has been restored to retain its rustic charm, with ancient cobbled streets, temples, and wharves and houses along its curving alleys. Most of these shops have turned into souvenirs stores.

The majority of the buildings in Huanglongxi date back from the Qing dynasty. The town features a number of temples and some of the well-known ones include Zhenjiang Temple (镇江寺), Chaoyin Temple (潮音寺) and Gulong Temple (古龙寺). It is for this reason that most of the filmmakers choose to shoot exterior scenes of period movies in this town. Temple fairs are organized in Huanglongxi on the ninth day of the sixth and ninth lunar month.
