= Jincheng Plaza East station =

Metro station in Chengdu, China

Jincheng Plaza East 锦城广场东
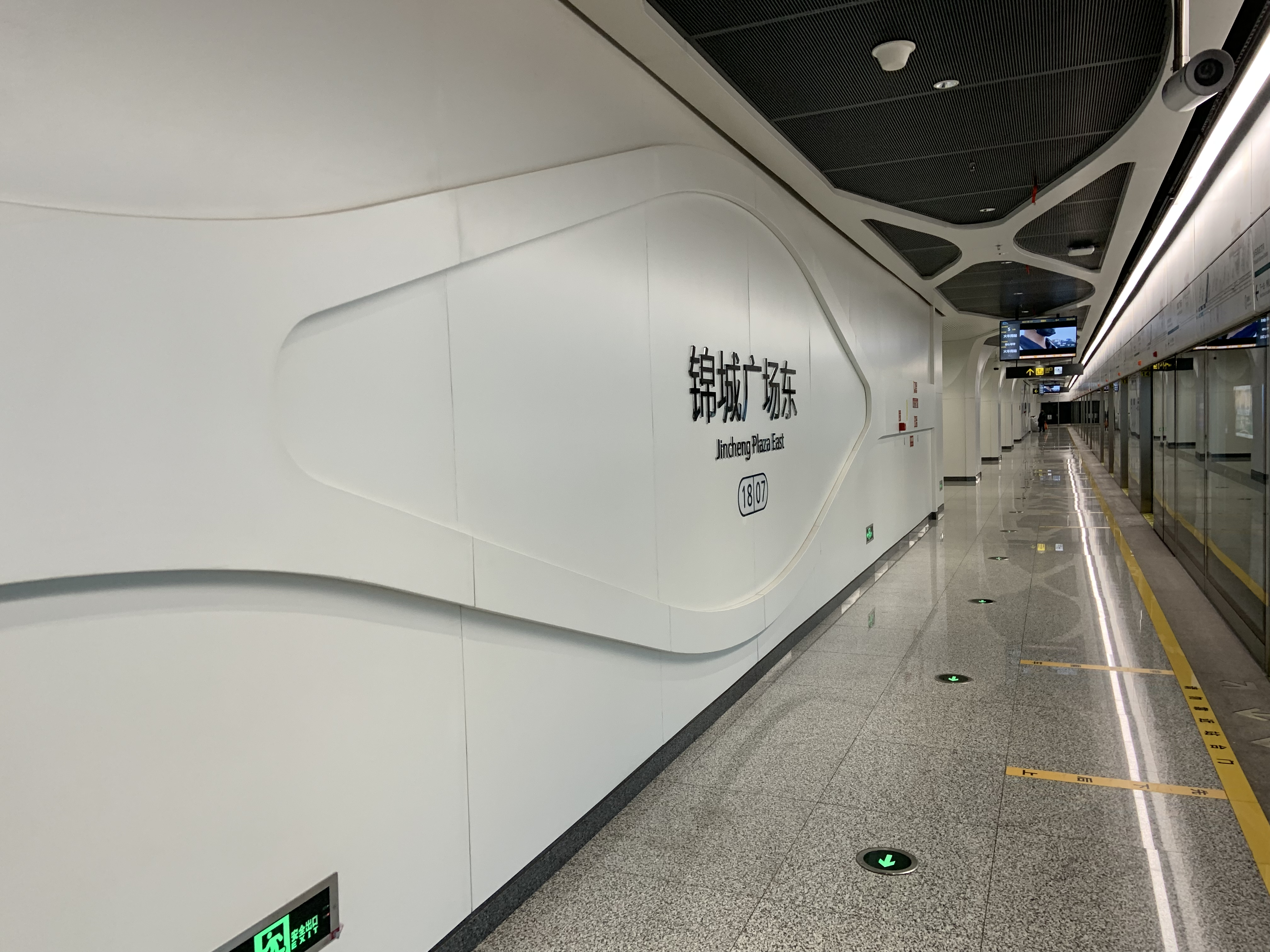

General information
- Location: Wuhou District, Chengdu, Sichuan; China
- Operated by: Chengdu Metro Limited
- Line: Line 18
- Platforms: 2 (1 island platform)

Other information
- Station code: 1807

History
- Opened: 27 September 2020

Services
Preceding station	Chengdu Metro	Following station
Incubation Park towards South Railway Station	Line 18	Century City towards Tianfu International Airport North
Location

Jincheng Plaza East (Chinese: 锦城广场东) is a station on Line 18 of the Chengdu Metro in China.
