= Century City station (Chengdu Metro) =

Metro station in Chengdu, China

Century City 世纪城
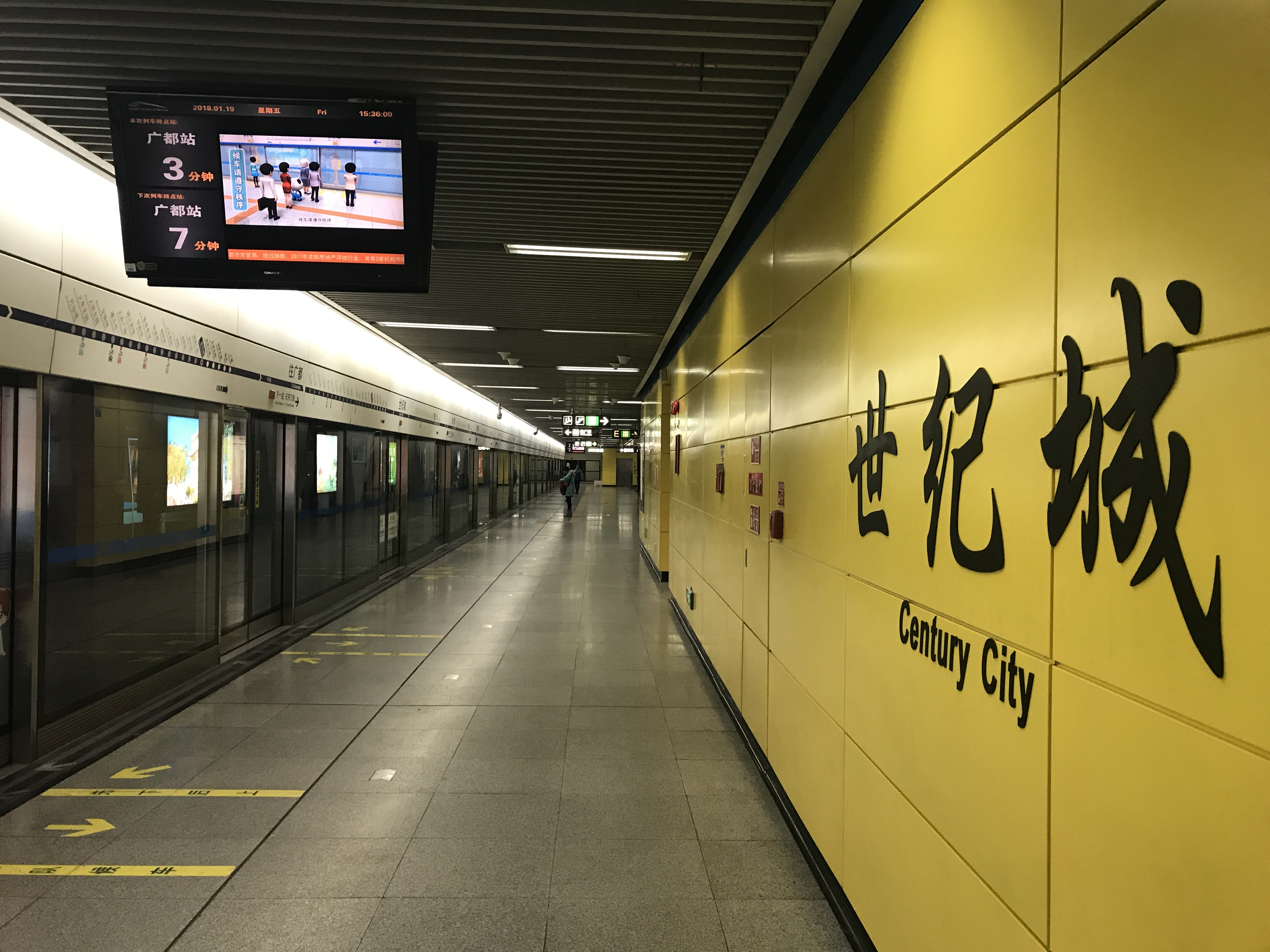

General information
- Location: Wuhou District, Chengdu, Sichuan; China
- Coordinates: 30.5549°N 104.0685°E
- Operated by: Chengdu Metro Limited
- Line(s): Line 1 Line 18
- Platforms: 4 (1 island platform, 2 side platforms)

Other information
- Station code: 0118 1808

History
- Opened: 27 September 2010

Services
| Preceding station | Chengdu Metro | Following station |
|---|---|---|
| Jincheng Plaza towards Weijianian | Line 1 | 3rd Tianfu Street towards Science City or Wugensong |
| Jincheng Plaza East towards South Railway Station | Line 18 | Haichang Road towards Tianfu International Airport North |

Century City (Chinese: 世纪城) is a station on Line 1 and Line 18 of the Chengdu Metro in China.

== Station layout ==
| G | Entrances and Exits | Exits A-F |
| B1 | Concourse | Faregates, Station Agent |
| B2 | Northbound | ← Line 18 towards South Railway Station (Jincheng Plaza East) |
| B2 | Island platform, doors open on the left |
| B2 | Southbound | Line 18 towards Sancha (Haichang Road) → |
| B2 | Side platform, doors open on the right |
| B2 | Northbound | ← Line 1 towards Weijianian (Jincheng Plaza) |
| B2 | Southbound | Line 1 towards Science City (3rd Tianfu Street) → |
| B2 | Side platform, doors open on the right |

== Gallery ==
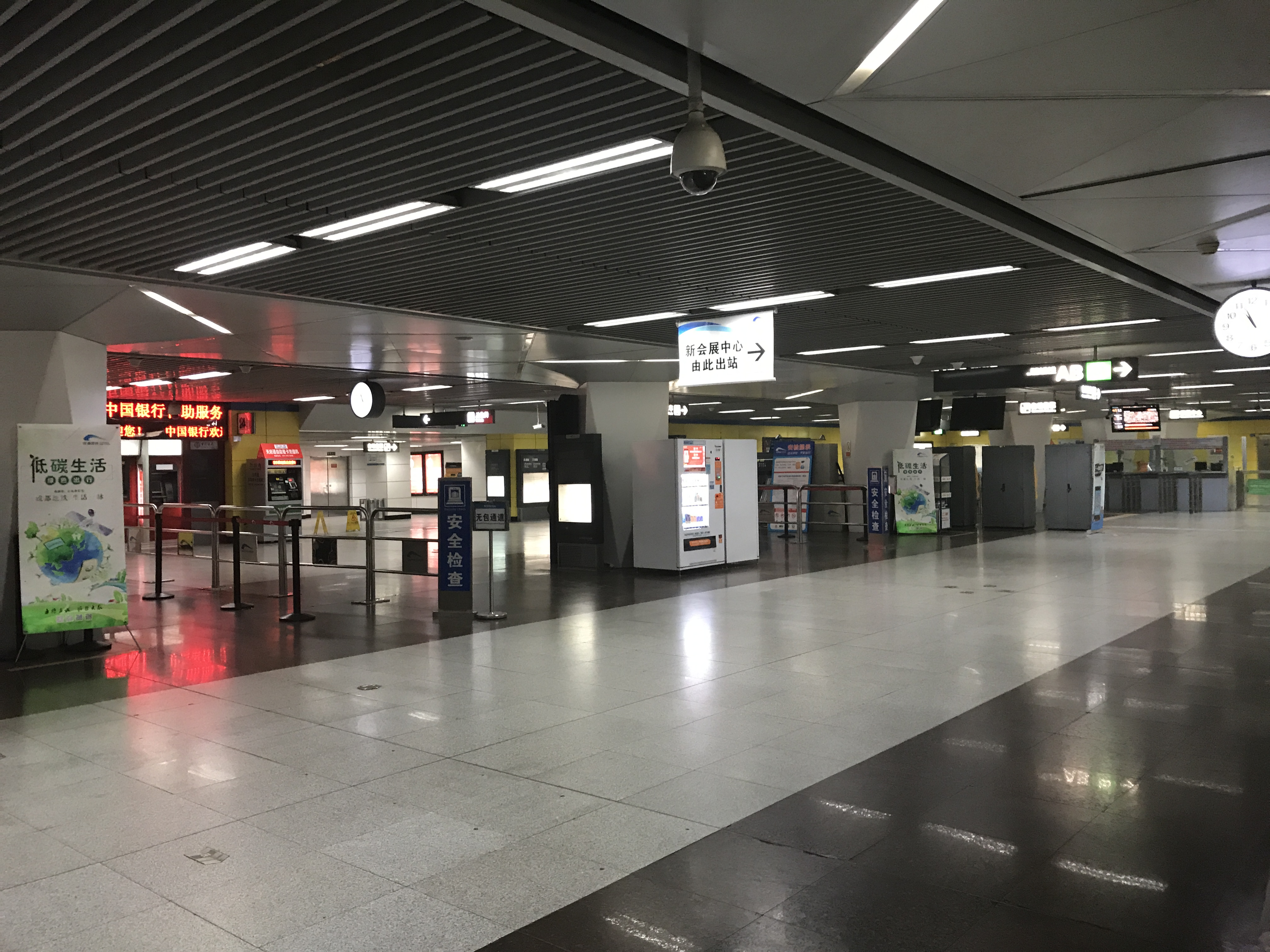
Concourse

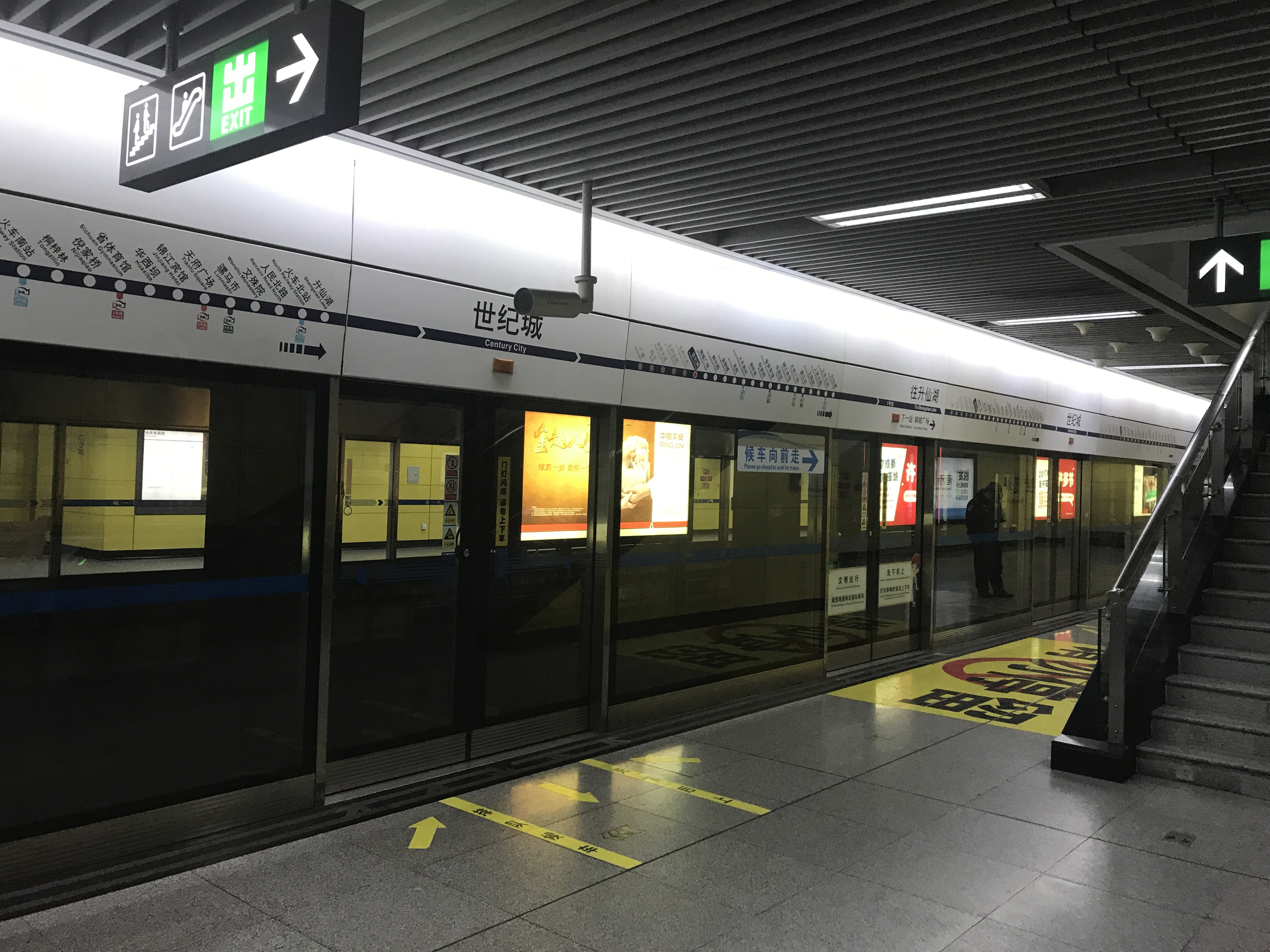
Line 1 platform

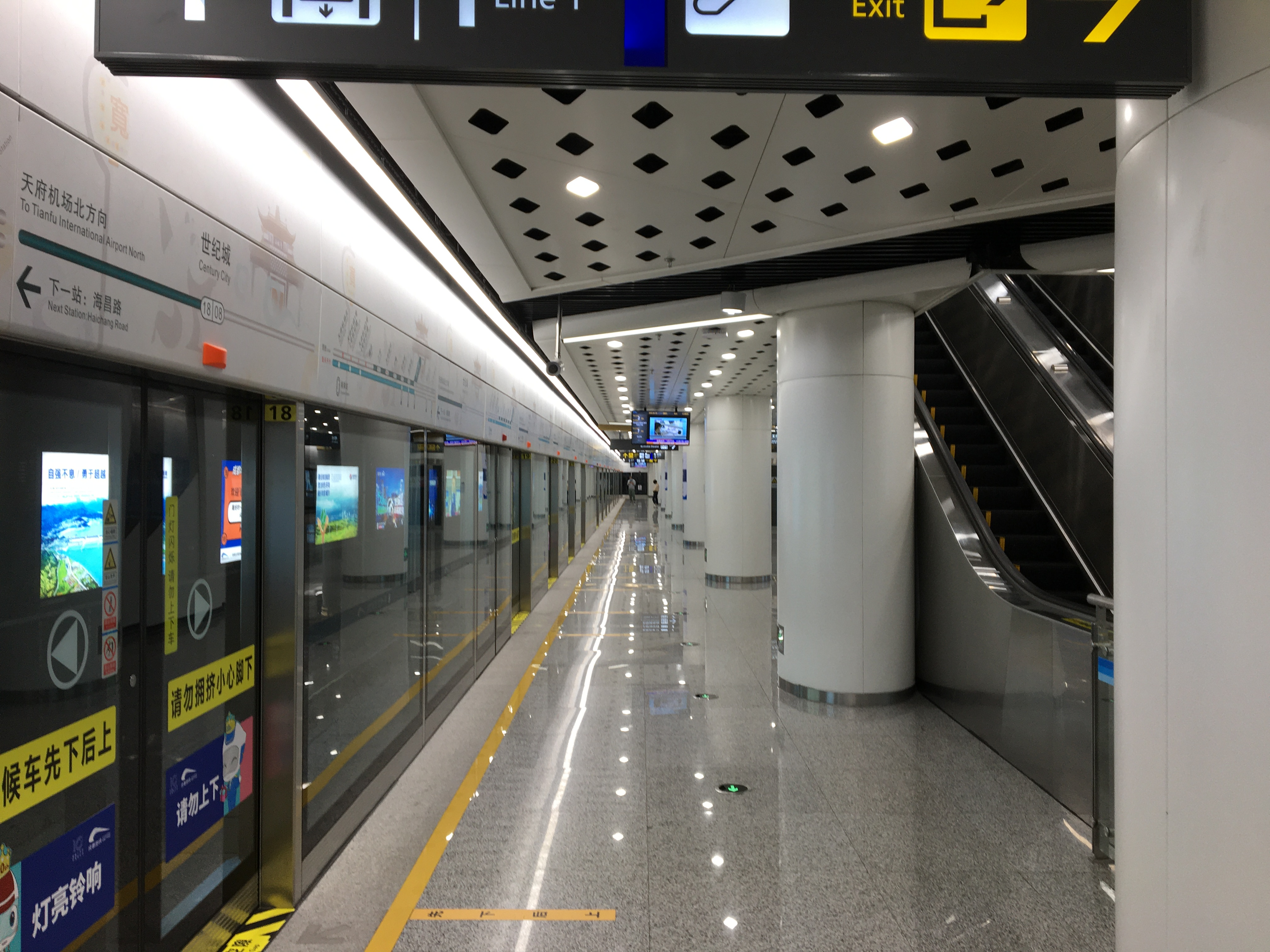
Line 18 platform
