= Line 18 (Chengdu Metro) =

Airport rail link of the Chengdu Metro

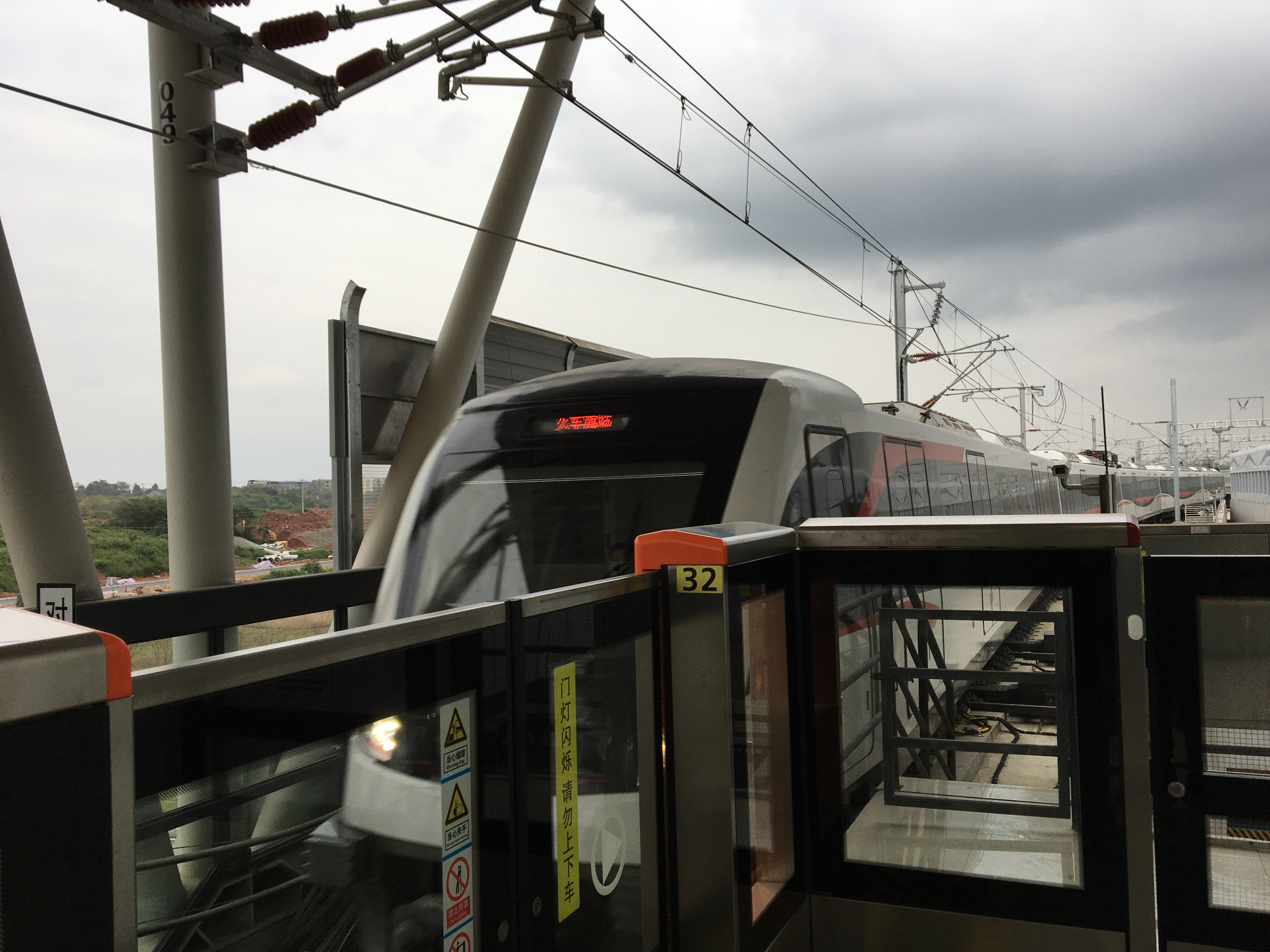

Overview
- Status: In operation
- Owner: Chengdu Rail Transit
- Locale: Chengdu, Sichuan
- Termini: South Railway Station; Tianfu International Airport North
- Stations: 12 (in operation); 18 (future)

Service
- Type: Rapid transit
- System: Chengdu Metro
- Operator(s): Chengdu Rail Transit Corporation
- Rolling stock: 8-car Type A

History
- Opened: 27 September 2020; 5 years ago (South Railway Station—Sancha)

Technical
- Line length: 69.99 km (43.5 mi)
- Number of tracks: 2 main tracks
- Track gauge: 1,435 mm (4 ft 8 1/2 in)
- Electrification: AC 25 kV, Overhead line
- Operating speed: 140 km/h (Designed 160 km/h)

Line 18 of the Chengdu Metro (simplified Chinese: 成都地铁18号线; traditional Chinese: 成都地鐵18號線; pinyin: Chéngdū Dìtiě Shíbā Hào Xiàn) is an express rapid transit line that connects the urban area of Chengdu with Chengdu Tianfu International Airport. Line 18's color is teal. The section from South Railway Station to Tianfu International Airport North Station started operation on 18 December 2020.

Between Chengdu South Railway Station and Western China International Expo City Station, the line runs adjacent to Line 1 essentially forming a four track subway. Line 18 runs express between the two stations, skipping a number of stops that Line 1 makes. The four track alignment with Line 1 will be extended to North Railway Station once Phase 3 of the line is completed.

== Description ==
=== Phase 1 & 2 ===
Phase 1 and 2 of the line, which is currently in operation, start at Chengdu South Railway Station and end at Chengdu Tianfu International Airport. The total length is 69.99 km (43.49 mi).

The line officially started construction on August 16, 2016. The section from South Railway Station to Sancha started operation on 27 September 2020. The line will use 8-car Type A rolling stock. The rolling stock have features designed for medium distance travel, such as a 140 km/h maximum speed and wide station spacing.

The line will also feature distinct express and local services using passing tracks at select stations with an express service stopping only at 4 intermediate stations, and planned to complete a trip between Chengdu South Railway Station to Chengdu Tianfu International Airport in 35 minutes. The local service will stop at all stations on Line 18 and will complete the trip in 40 to 50 minutes.

=== Phase 3 ===
On December 9, 2019, the Department of Ecology and Environment of Sichuan Province approved new extensions for Line 18. Line 18 Phase 3 includes North Extension, Linjiang Section, and South Extension. It is 16.715 kilometers long, all underground. In total, 6 underground stations (4 transfer stations), 1 reserved station, and 1 new depot will be built.

==== North Section ====
Line 18 is planned to extend north to North Railway Station on Line 1 serving downtown Chengdu and providing full parallel express service along the core portion of Line 1. The length of the extension is 10.985 kilometers with 4 new stations.

==== South Section ====
Line 18 is also planned to extend south beyond Tianfu International Airport Terminals 1 & 2 Station to Guanyan, adding 5.75 kilometers and 2 new underground stations and Linjiang Depot. On June 18, 2020, the Government of Chengdu changed the name of Linjiang Station to Guanyan Station.

=== Phase 4 ===
Jianyang Housing and Urban Planning Bureau officially released the plan for Line 18 Phase 4 to be extended to Jianyang South Railway Station.

This extension, now Line S3 (aka Ziyang line), connects to Line 18 at Futian Station. Line S3 (Ziyang line) is currently undergoing geological investigation in central Ziyang.

== History ==
- On July 11, 2016, the NDRC approved the third phase of expansion for the Chengdu Metro, which includes Line 18.
- On August 16, 2016, Line 18 started construction.
- On February 28, 2017, first tunnel machine started tunneling.
- On June 27, 2017, Sichuan Development and Reform Commission approved phase 2.
- On August 18, 2017, the first station: Xinglong Station finished roofing and construction.
- On October 24, 2018, Futian - T3/T4 section finished tunnel construction.
- On January 29, 2019, Phase 1 and Phase 2 finished viaduct construction.
- On May 31, 2019, the first tunnel section was completed.
- On June 2, 2019, all tunnels in Phase 1 and Phase 2 are connected.
- On June 13, 2019, Line 18's first train started testing in Chengdu.
- On June 1, 2020, systems testing and debugging began.
- On June 2, 2020, Line 18, the biggest PPP project in China, started its 3-month trial operation in preparation for opening.
- On August 6, 2020, Line 18 completed fire-prevention assessment.
- On September 27, 2020, the first and second section (from South Railway Station to Sancha) of Line 18 was opened.
- On December 18, 2020, Line 18 Sancha (excluding) to Tianfu International Airport North was opened.
- On June 27, 2021, an infill station, Terminal 1 & 2 of Tianfu International Airport station opened with Chengdu Tianfu International Airport.
- In December 2022, Chengdu Metro's deepest, and also first 4-line transfer station: Luomashi, finished digging. Line 18 Phase 1's platform is 45.5M deep, with North Railway Station ~ Luomashi 's deepest tunnel at 48.8M, equivalent to 16-floors underground. Luomashi has Line 1, Line 4, Line 10, and Line 18.
- On 26 March 2023, Line 18 has increased express service from 6 to 16 trains, to match the increasing needs for Chengdu Tianfu International Airport and daily commuters. Line 18 also increased 58 trains daily (36 trains for Airport Express Service).
- On 1 June 2023, express service has restructured to be through train services, no longer stop at Incubation Park, Haichang Road and Sancha.
- On 13 August 2023, Futian station opened service.
- On 28 November 2023, with start of line 19 phase 2 operation and interchange-only open of Tianfu Station, two cross-line through services have introduced, one stop at each stations of line 19 and stations of line 18 east of Tianfu Station, another "directly through" service, 6 times to-and-fro per a day, from Jinxing to Terminal 1 & 2 of Tianfu International Airport.

== Stations ==
Service routes					Station No.	Station name		Transfer	Distance km		Location
Local			Express		Station No.	English	Chinese	Transfer	Distance km		Location
					1801	North Railway Station	火车北站	1 7 Chengdu			Jinniu
					1802	Luomashi	骡马市	1 4 10			Qingyang
					1803	Sichuan Gymnasium	省体育馆	1 3			Wuhou
					1804	Nijiaqiao	倪家桥	1 8			Wuhou
●	●		●		1805	South Railway Station	火车南站	1 7 Chengdu South	-	0	Wuhou (South High-Tech Zone)
●	●		｜		1806	Incubation Park	孵化园	1 9	3.003	3.003	Wuhou (South High-Tech Zone)
●	●		｜		1807	Jincheng Plaza East	锦城广场东		0.943	3.946	Wuhou (South High-Tech Zone)
●	●		｜		1808	Century City	世纪城	1	1.514	5.460	Wuhou (South High-Tech Zone)
●	●		｜		1809	Haichang Road	海昌路	1	6.884	12.344	Shuangliu (Tianfu New Area)
●	●		｜		1810	Western China Int'l Expo City	西博城	1 6	7.533	19.877	Shuangliu (Tianfu New Area)
●	●		｜		1811	Xinglong	兴隆		3.914	23.791	Shuangliu (Tianfu New Area)
●	●		｜		1812	Tianfu Station (Note: Only interchange service available, no entrances and exits at the moment.)	天府站	19; Tianfu (U/C)	5.237	29.028	Shuangliu (Tianfu New Area)
		↑			Through-service to/from Jinxing of Line 19						
				↑	Direct through-service to/from East of Terminal 2 of Shuangliu International Airport of Line 19						
●		●	｜	｜	1813	Sancha	三岔		19.161	48.189	Jianyang (East New Area)
●		●	｜	｜	1814	Futian	福田	S3	7.985	56.174	Jianyang (East New Area)
｜		｜	｜	｜	1815	Terminal 3 & 4 of Tianfu International Airport (reserved station)	天府机场3号4号航站楼	TFU	9.176	—	Jianyang (East New Area)
●		●	●	●	1816	Terminal 1 & 2 of Tianfu International Airport	天府机场1号2号航站楼	TFU	9.176	65.350	Jianyang (East New Area)
●		●	●		1817	Tianfu International Airport North	天府机场北		2.596	67.946	Jianyang (East New Area)
					1818	Guanyan	官堰				Jianyang (East New Area)
					1819	Jianyang South Railway Station	简阳南站				Jianyang (East New Area)

== See also ==
- Chengdu Metro
- Chengdu Tianfu International Airport
- Urban rail transit in China
- Jianyang
