= Incubation Park station =

Station of Chengdu Metro

Incubation Park 孵化园
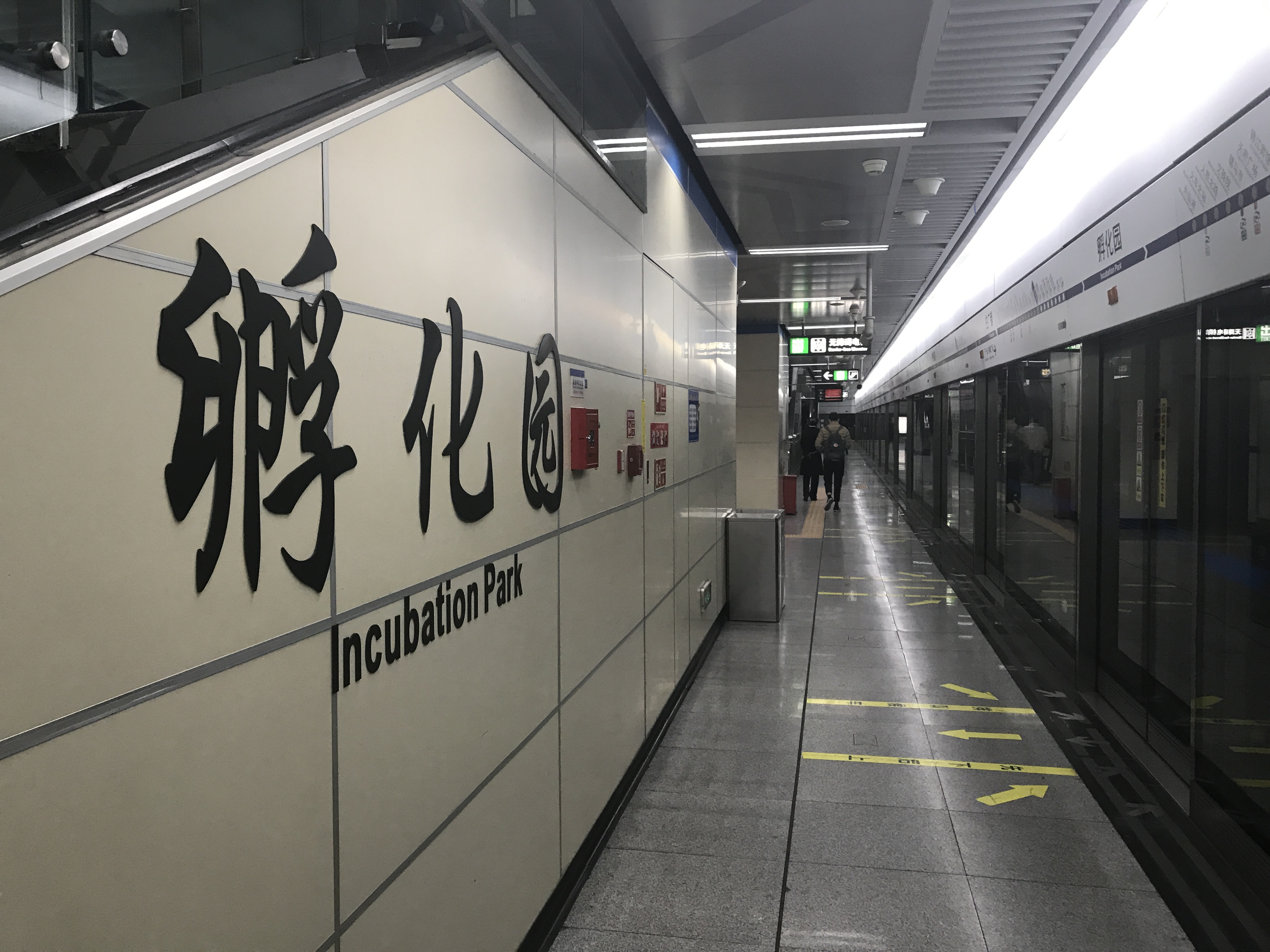

General information
- Location: Wuhou District, Chengdu, Sichuan; China
- Coordinates: 30.5783°N 104.0609°E
- Operator: Chengdu Metro Limited
- Lines: Line 1 Line 9 Line 18
- Platforms: 6 (2 island platforms, 2 side platforms)

Construction
- Structure type: Underground

Other information
- Station code: 0116 0903 1806

History
- Opened: 27 September 2010 (Line 1); 27 September 2020 (Line 18); 18 December 2020 (Line 9)

Services
Preceding station	Chengdu Metro	Following station
Financial City towards Weijianian	Line 1	Jincheng Plaza towards Science City or Wugensong
Xindao towards Financial City East	Line 9	Jincheng Avenue towards Huangtianba
South Railway Station Terminus	Line 18	Jincheng Plaza East towards Tianfu International Airport North
Location

Incubation Park (Chinese: 孵化园) is an interchange station on Line 1, Line 9, and Line 18 of Chengdu Metro in Chengdu, Sichuan, China.

== Station layout ==
G	Entrances and Exits	Exits A-C, E-H, J-L
B1	Concourse	Faregates, Station Agent
B2	Northbound	← Line 1 towards Weijianian (Financial City)
B2	Side platform, doors open on the left (Northbound trains only)
B2	Southbound	Line 1 towards Science City (Jincheng Plaza) →
B2	Side platform, doors open on the right
B3	Northbound	← Line 9 towards Huangtianba (Jincheng Avenue)
B3	Island platform, doors open on the left
B3	Southbound	Line 9 towards Financial City East (Xindao) →
B4	Northbound	← Line 18 towards South Railway Station (Terminus)
B4	Island platform, doors open on the left
B4	Southbound	Line 18 towards Sancha (Jincheng Plaza East) →

== Gallery ==
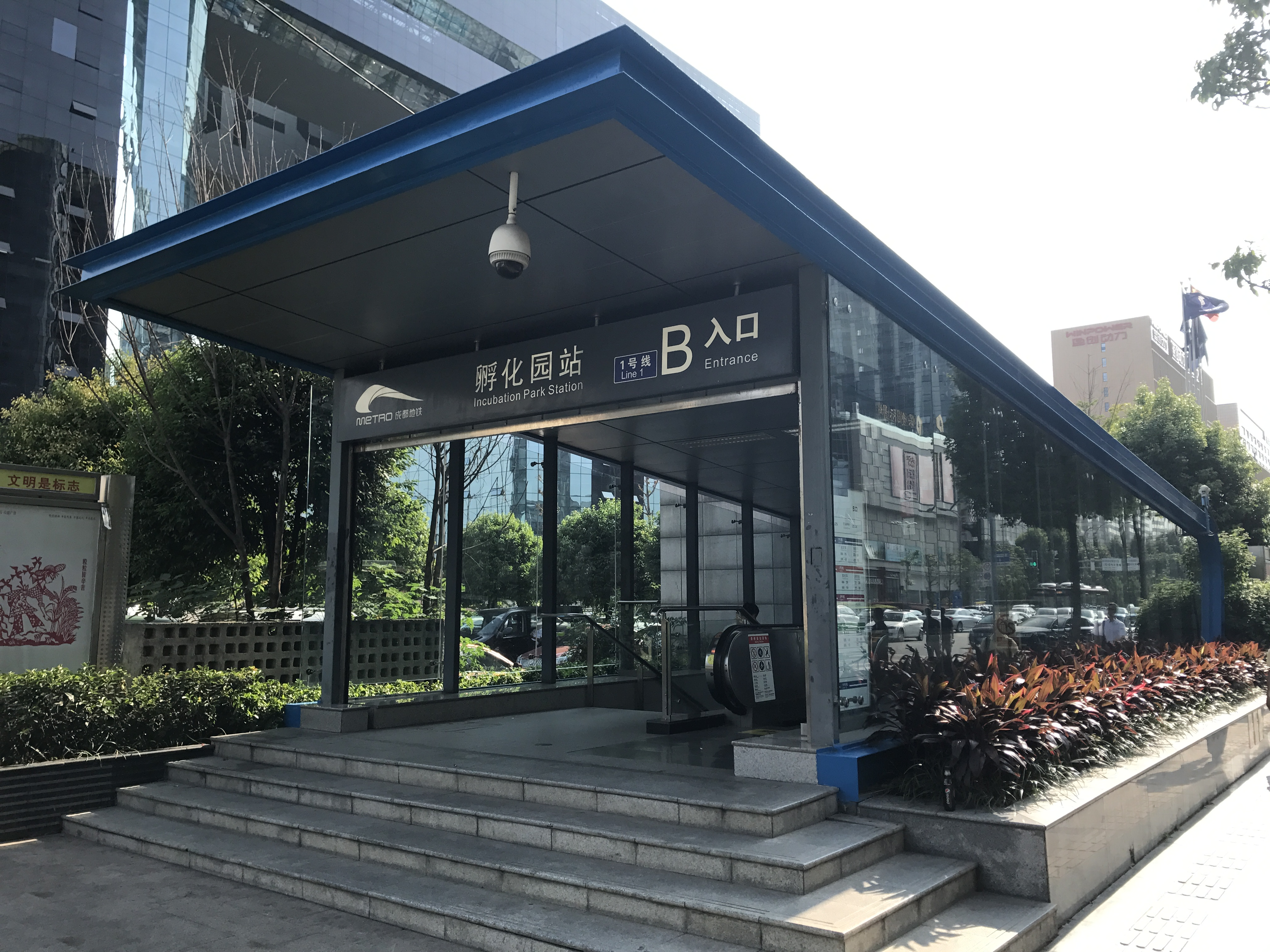
Entrance B

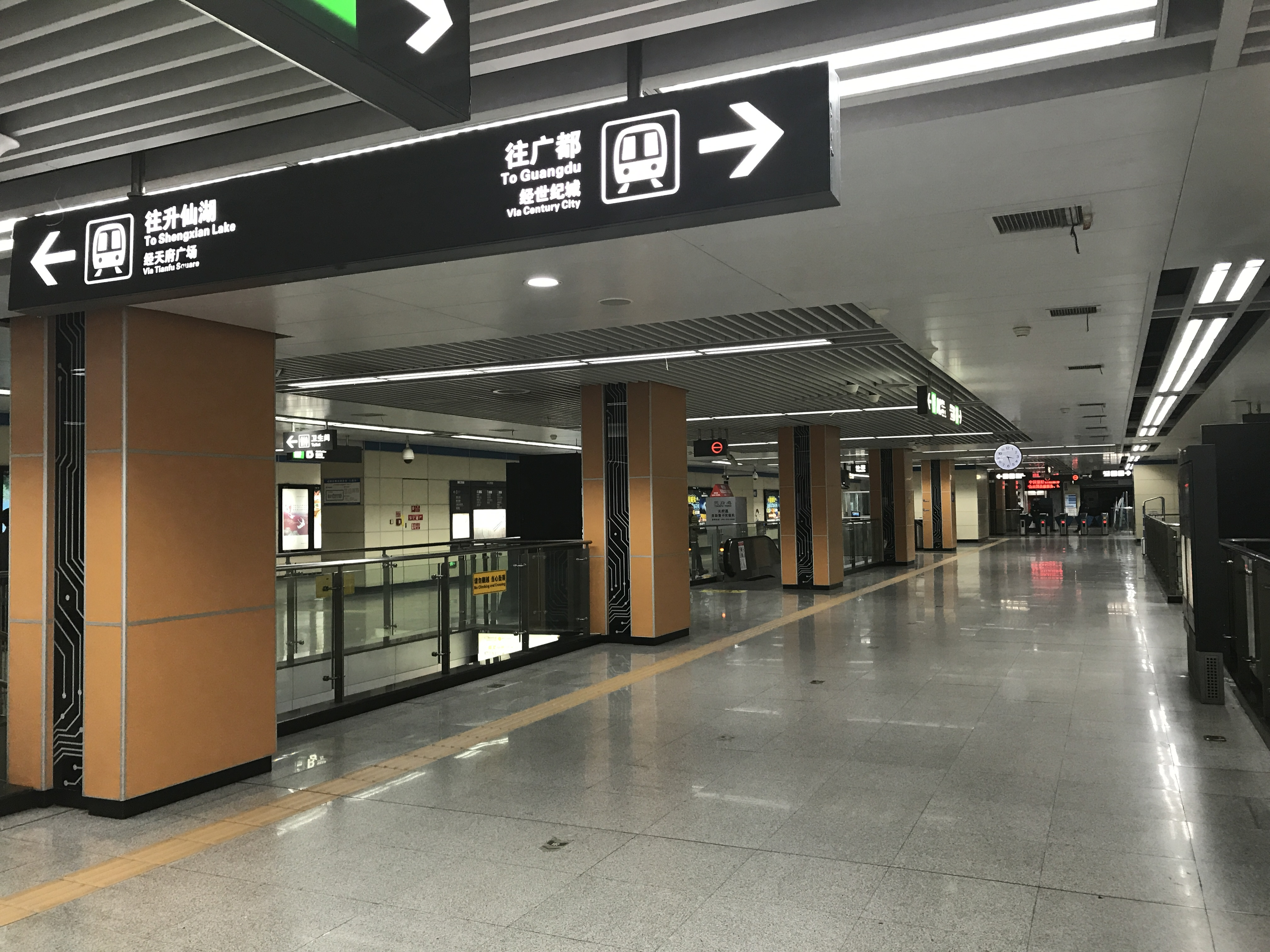
Concourse

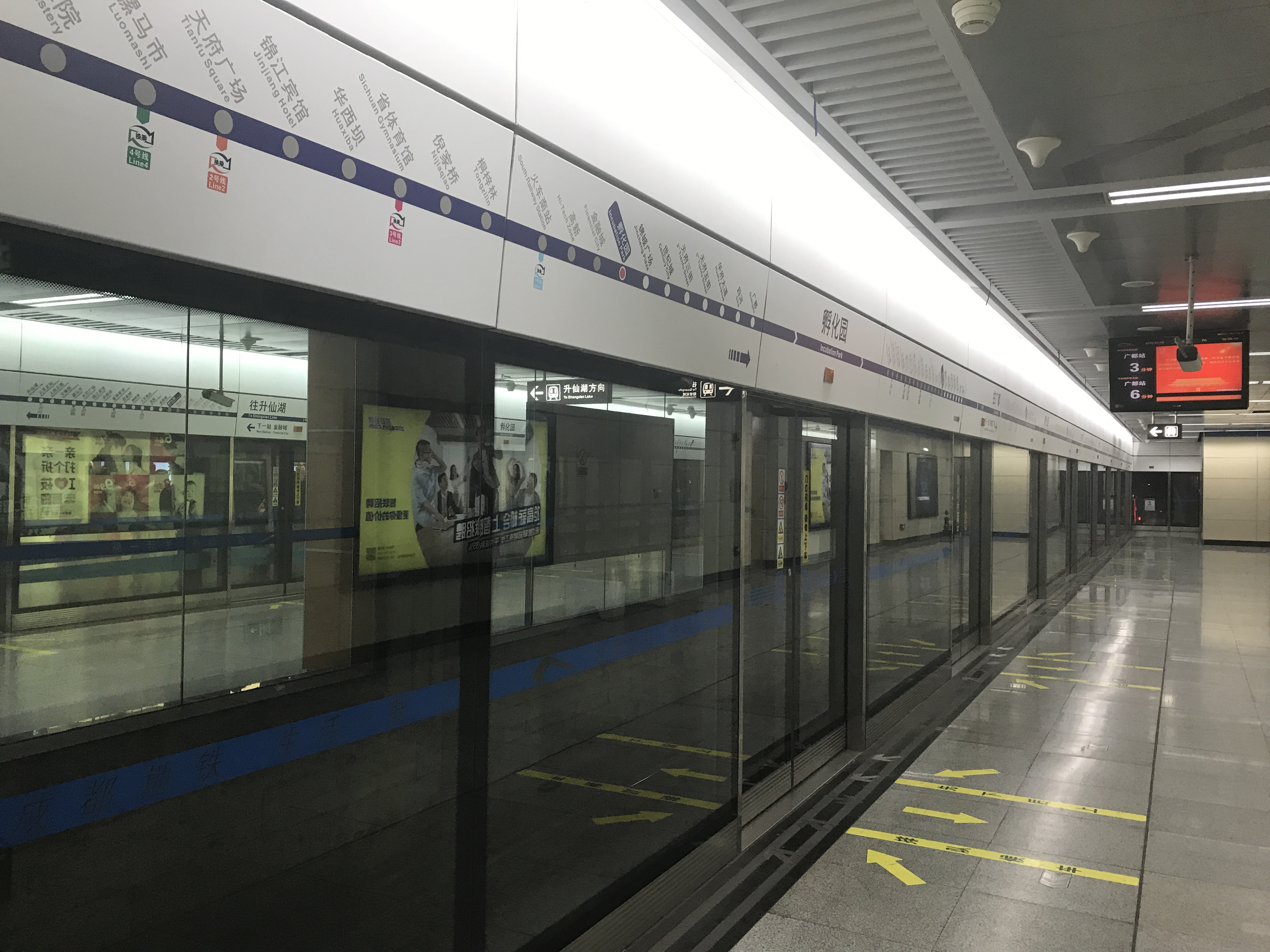
Line 1 platform

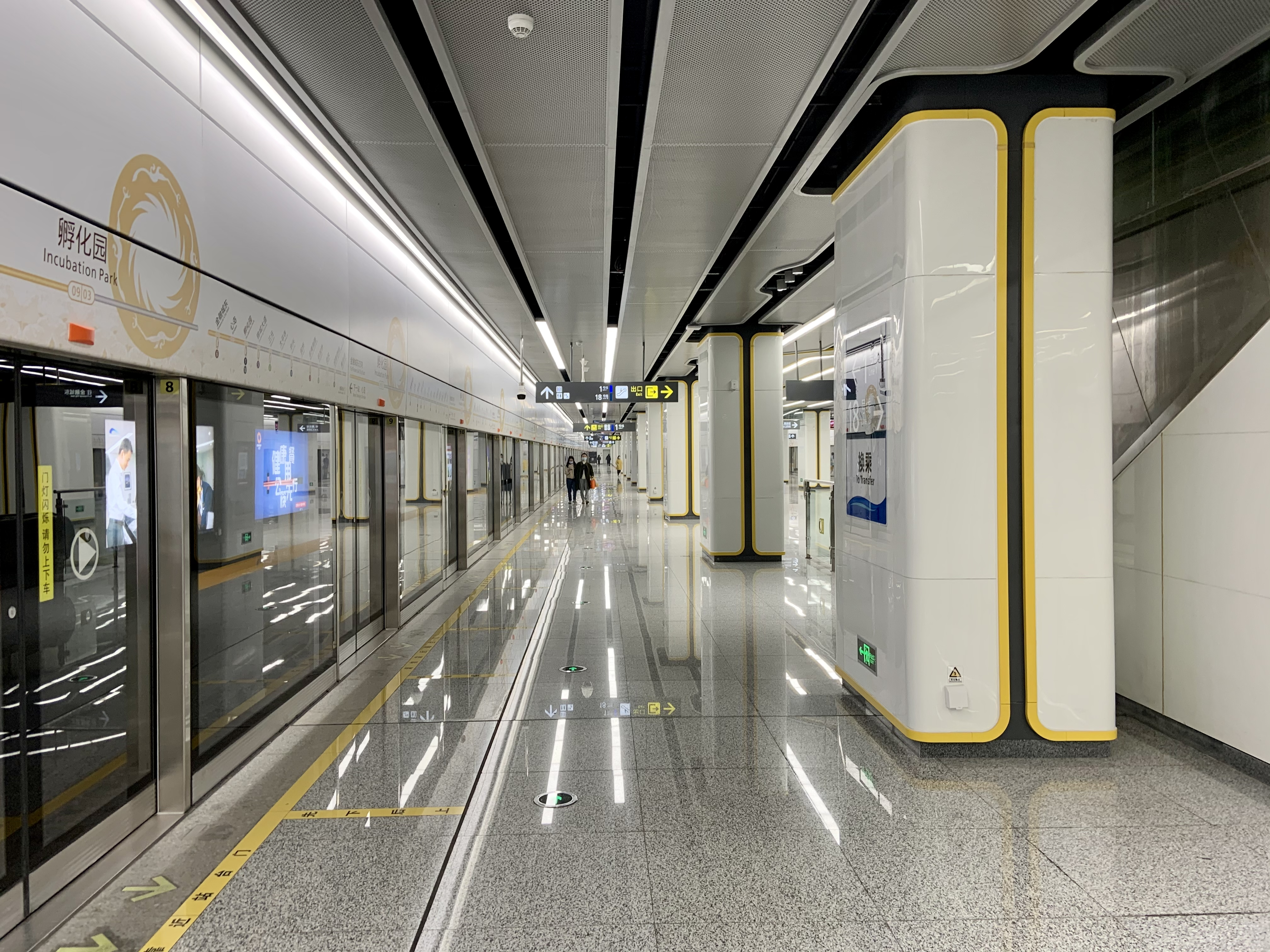
Line 9 platform

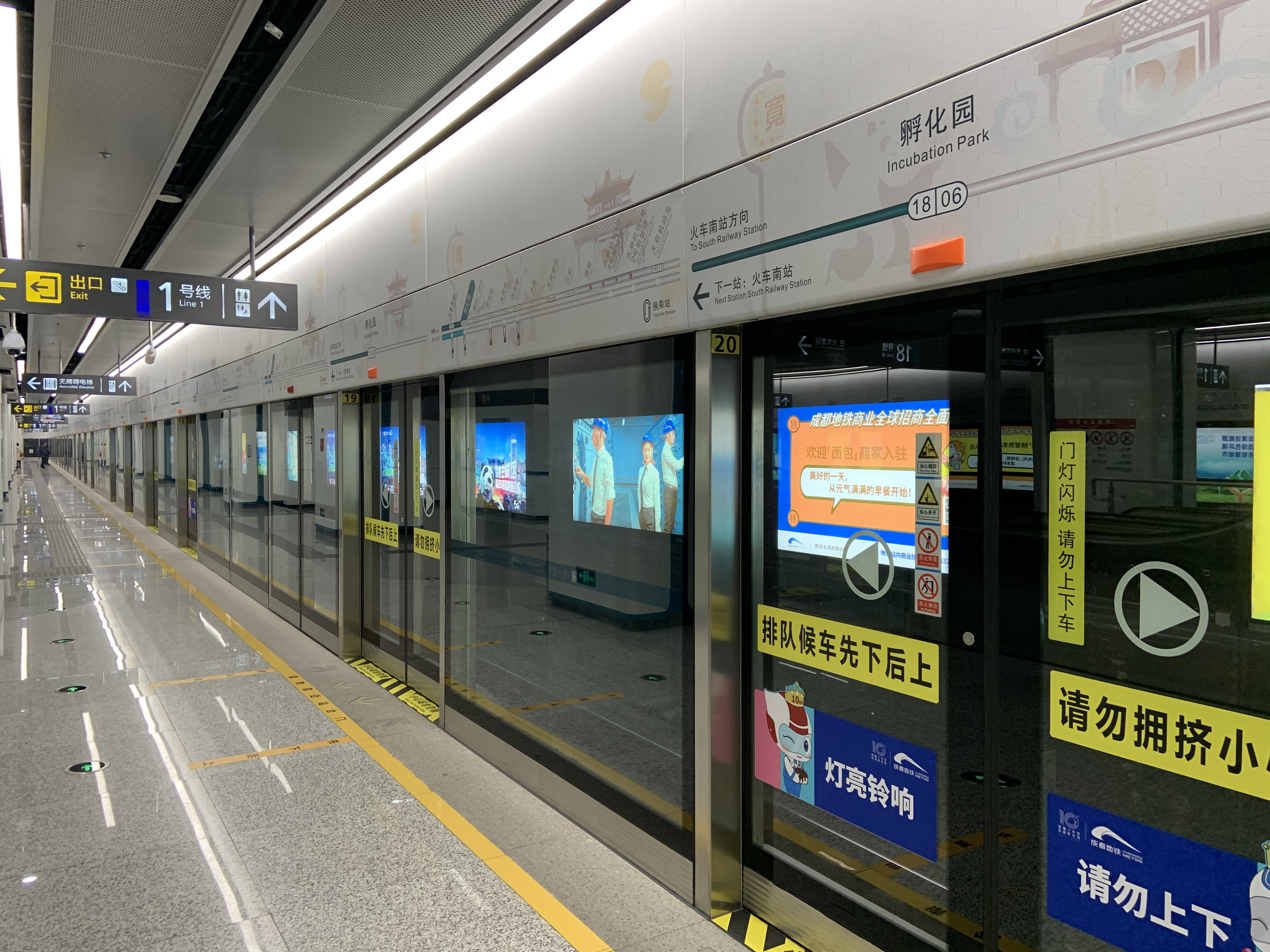
Line 18 platform
