= Jincheng Plaza station =

Railway station in Chengdu, China

Jincheng Plaza 锦城广场
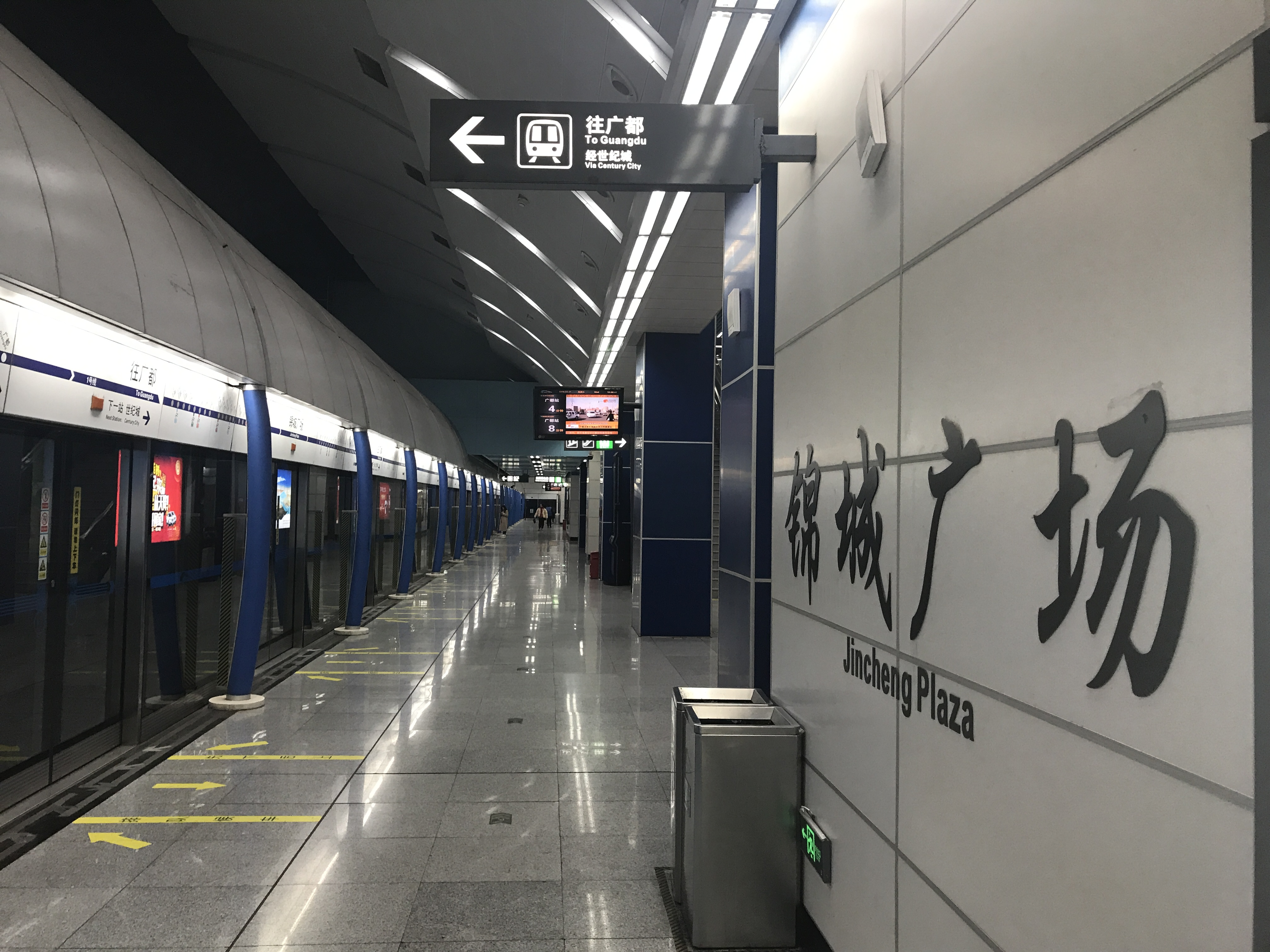

General information
- Location: Wuhou District, Chengdu, Sichuan; China
- Coordinates: 30.5693°N 104.0608°E
- Operator: Chengdu Metro Limited
- Line: Line 1
- Platforms: 2 (2 side platforms)

Other information
- Station code: 0117

History
- Opened: 8 June 2013

Services
Preceding station	Chengdu Metro	Following station
Incubation Park towards Weijianian	Line 1	Century City towards Science City or Wugensong
Location

Jincheng Plaza (Chinese: 锦城广场) is a metro station on Line 1 of the Chengdu Metro in China. It serves the New Century Global Center, the world's largest building measured by floor space.

== Station layout ==
G	Entrances and Exits	Exits A-E
B1	Concourse	Faregates, Station Agent
B2	Side platform, doors open on the right
B2	Northbound	← Line 1 towards Weijianian (Incubation Park)
B2	Southbound	Line 1 towards Science City (Century City) →
B2	Side platform, doors open on the right

== Gallery ==
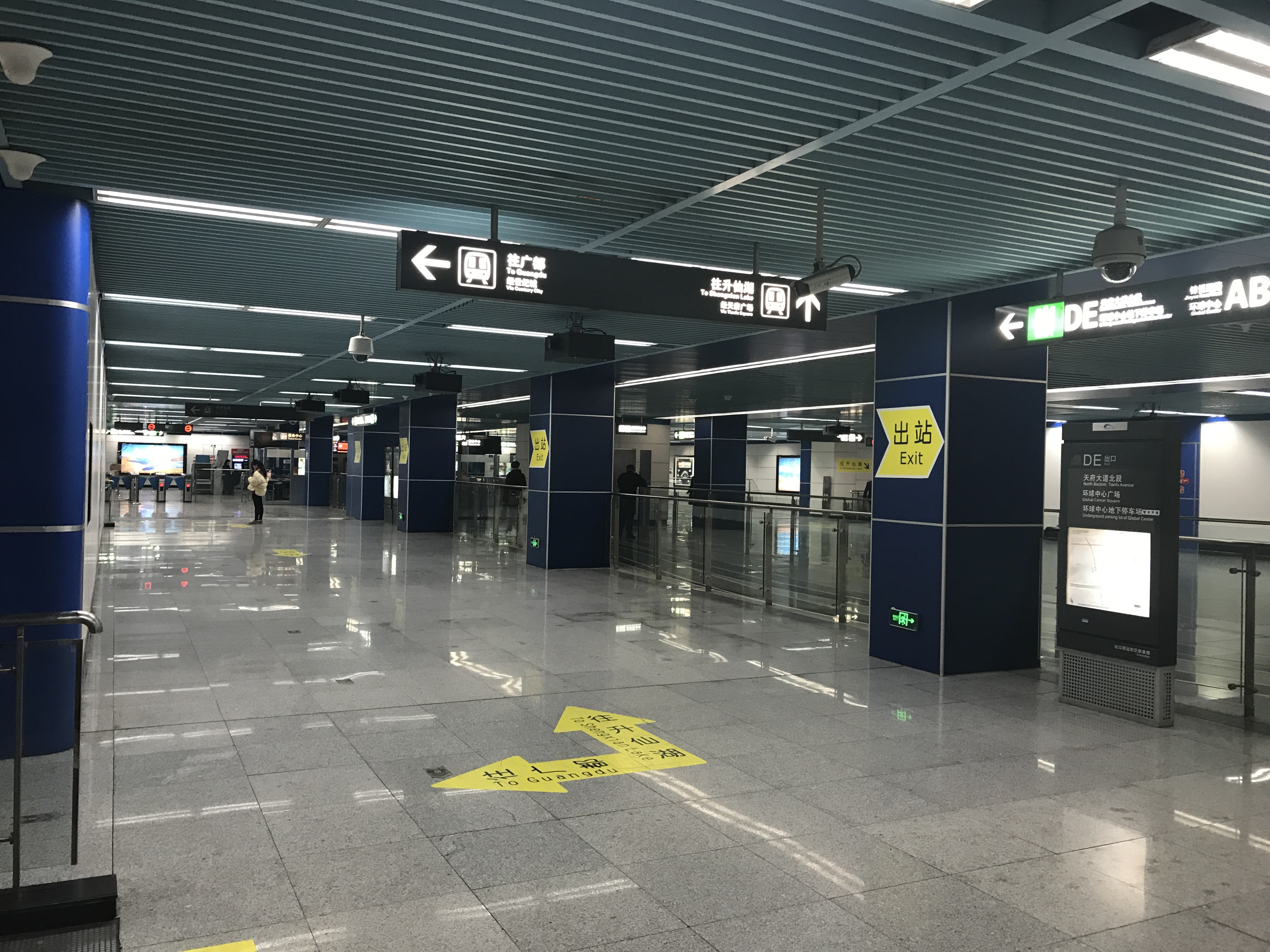
Concourse

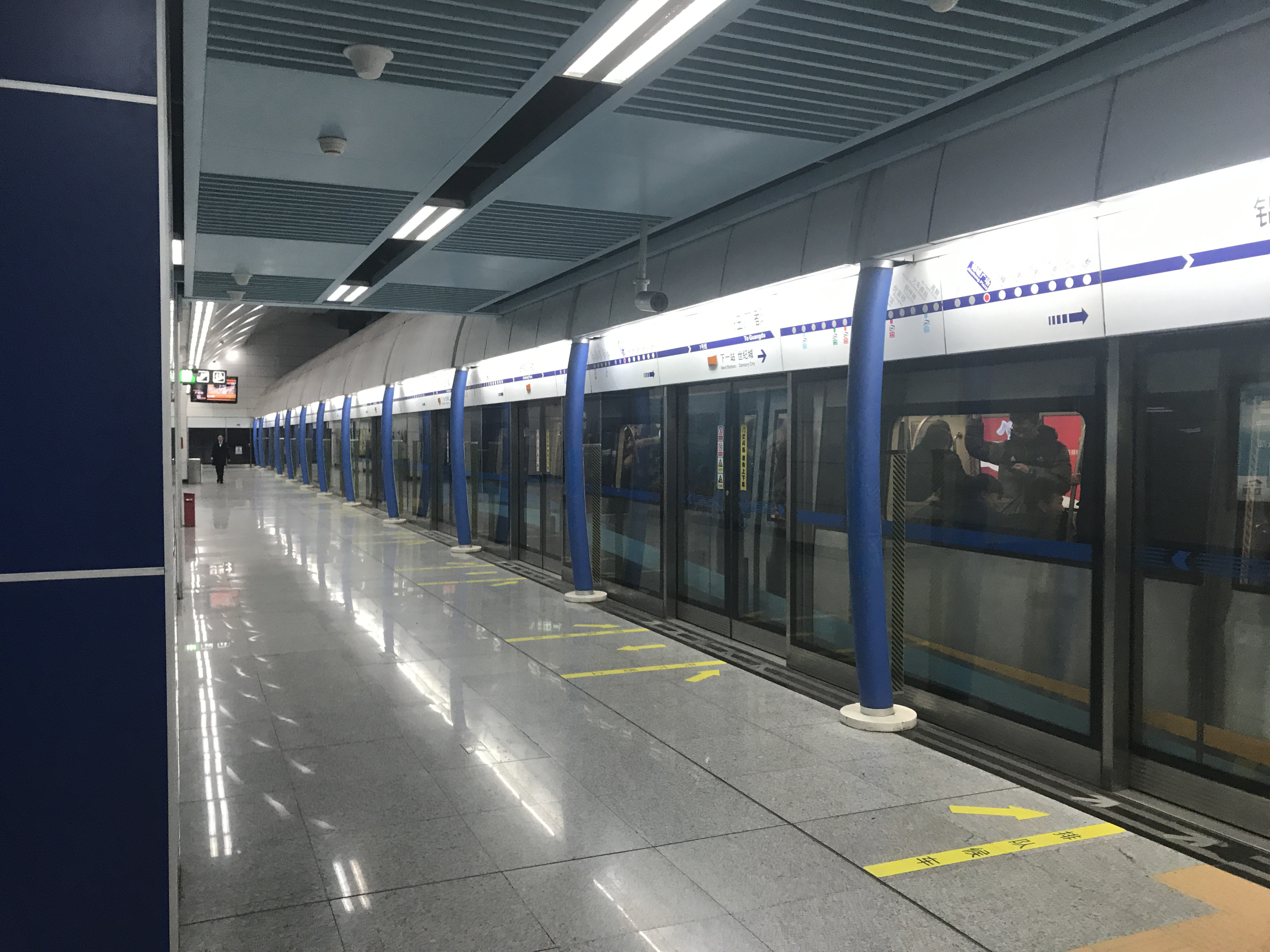
Platform
