= Jincheng Avenue station =

Metro station in Chengdu, China

Jincheng Avenue 锦城大道
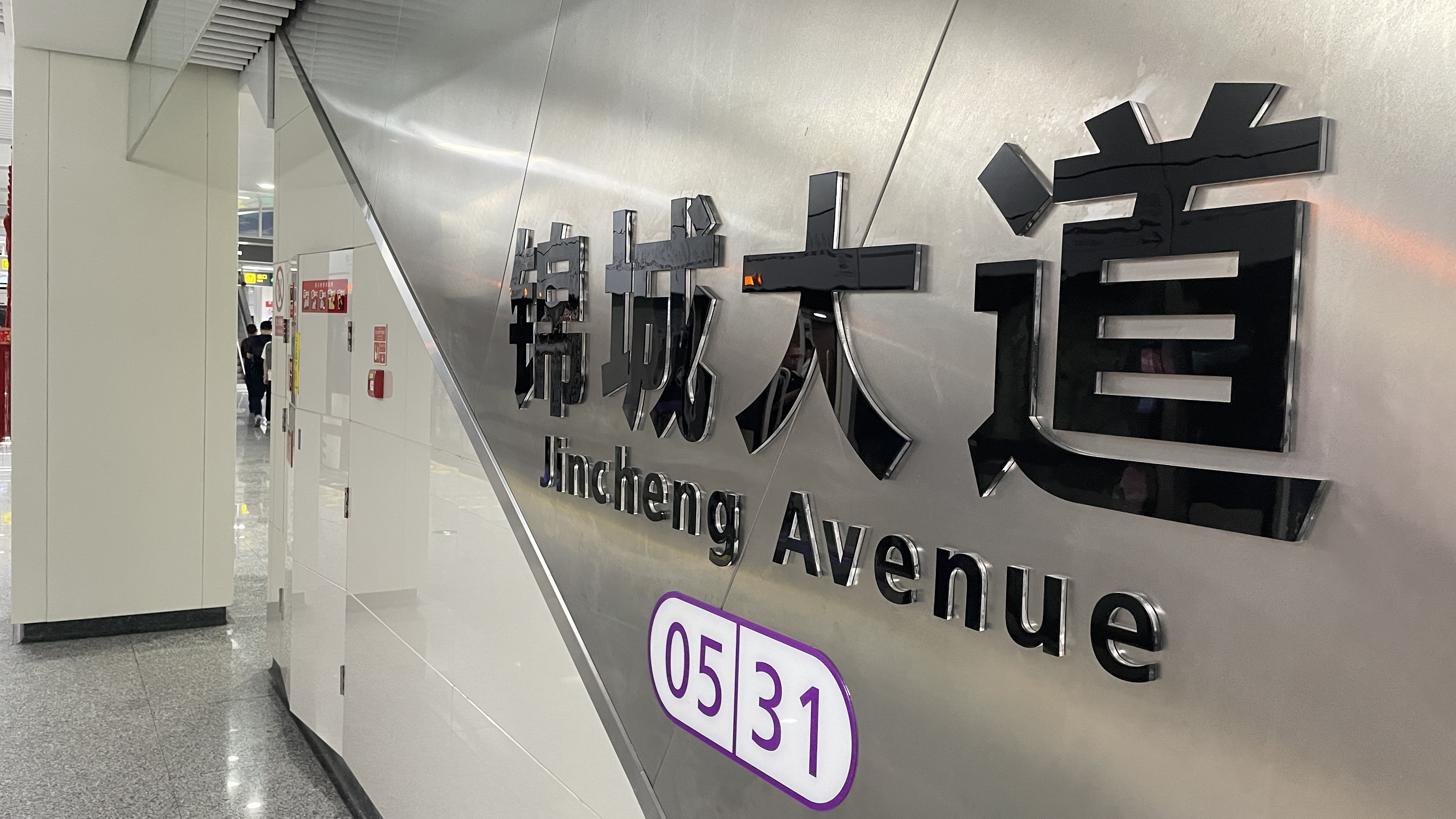
- Line 5 platform

General information
- Location: Wuhou District, Chengdu, Sichuan; China
- Operated by: Chengdu Metro Limited
- Lines: Line 5 Line 9
- Platforms: 4 (2 island platforms)

Other information
- Station code: 0531 0904

History
- Opened: 27 December 2019

Services
Preceding station	Chengdu Metro	Following station
Jiaozi Avenue towards Huagui Road	Line 5	Jincheng Lake towards Huilong
Incubation Park towards Financial City East	Line 9	Sanyuan towards Huangtianba
Location

Jincheng Avenue (Chinese: 锦城大道) is a station on Line 5 and Line 9 of the Chengdu Metro in China. It was opened on 27 December 2019.
