= 3rd Tianfu Street station =

Metro station in Chengdu, China

3rd Tianfu Street 天府三街
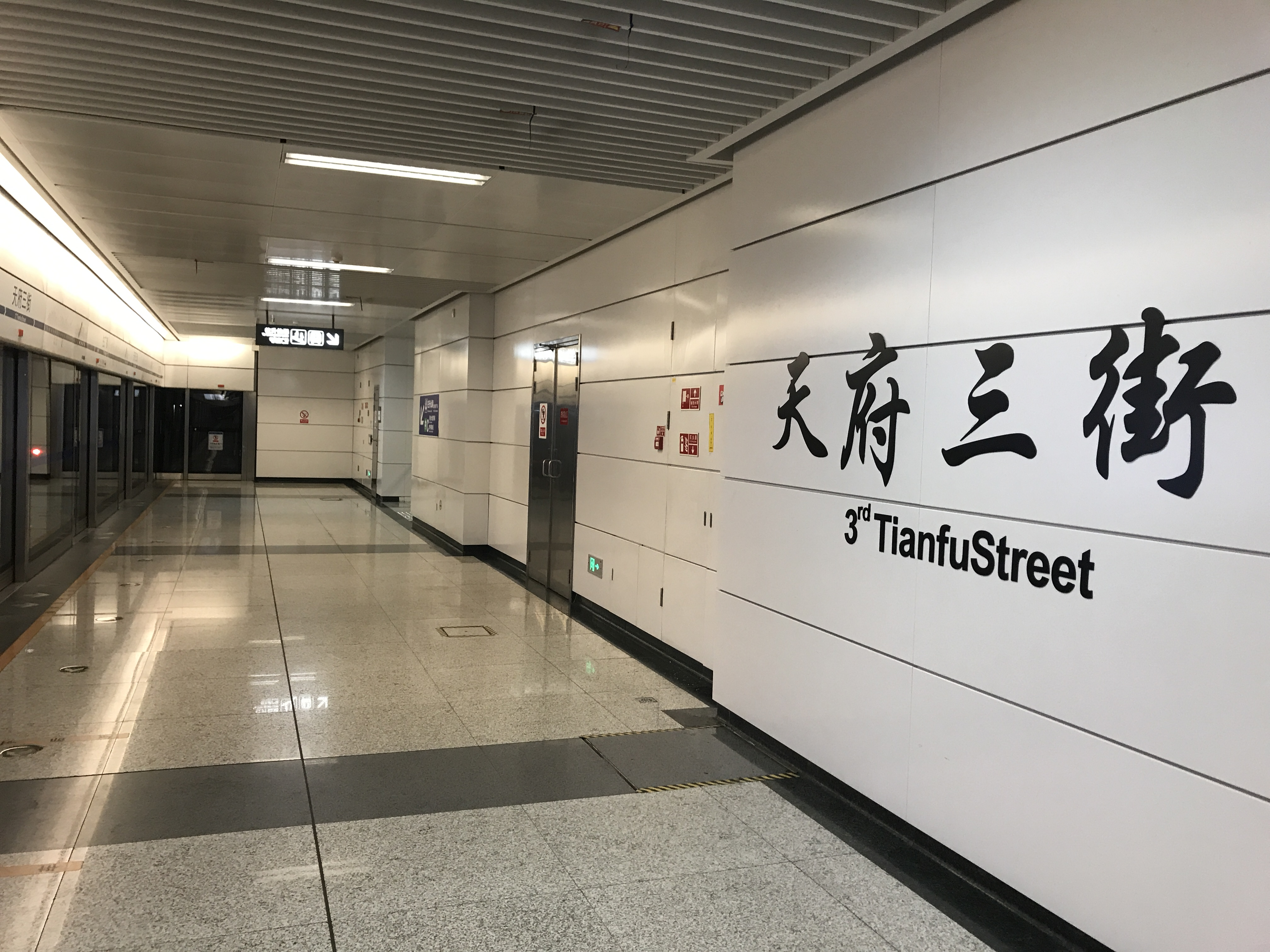

General information
- Location: Wuhou District, Chengdu, Sichuan; China
- Coordinates: 30.5513°N 104.0693°E
- Operated by: Chengdu Metro Limited
- Line(s): Line 1
- Platforms: 2 (2 side platforms)

Other information
- Station code: 0119

History
- Opened: 25 July 2015

Services
Preceding station	Chengdu Metro	Following station
Century City towards Weijianian	Line 1	5th Tianfu Street towards Science City or Wugensong

3rd Tianfu Street (Chinese: 天府三街) is a station on Line 1 of the Chengdu Metro in China.

== Station layout ==
G	Entrances and Exits	Exits A-C
B1	Concourse	Faregates, Station Agent
B1	Side platform, doors open on the right
B1	Northbound	← Line 1 towards Weijianian (Century City)
B1	Southbound	Line 1 towards Science City (5th Tianfu Street) →
B1	Side platform, doors open on the right
B1	Concourse	Faregates, Station Agent
B2	Underpass

== Gallery ==
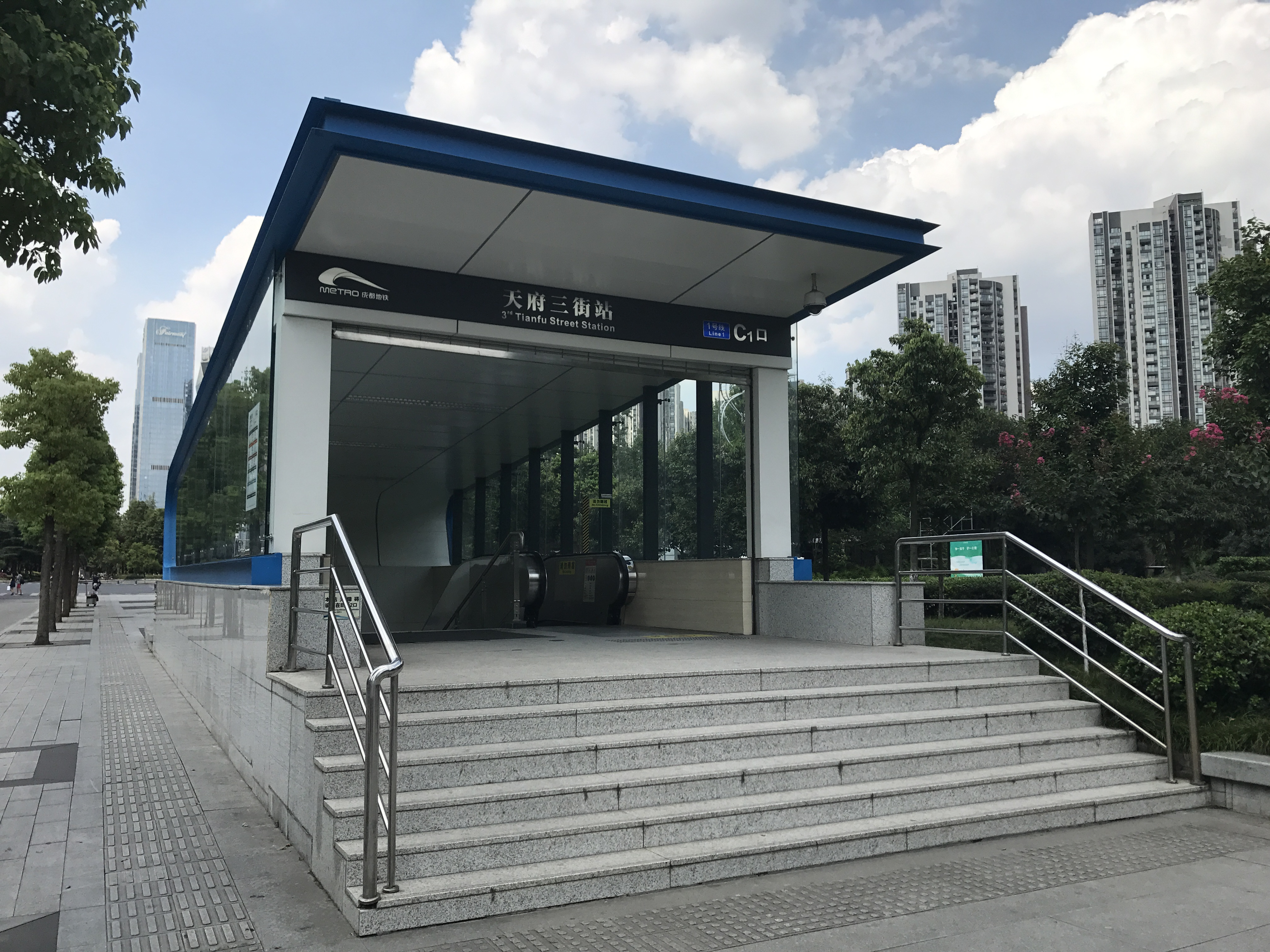
Entrance C1

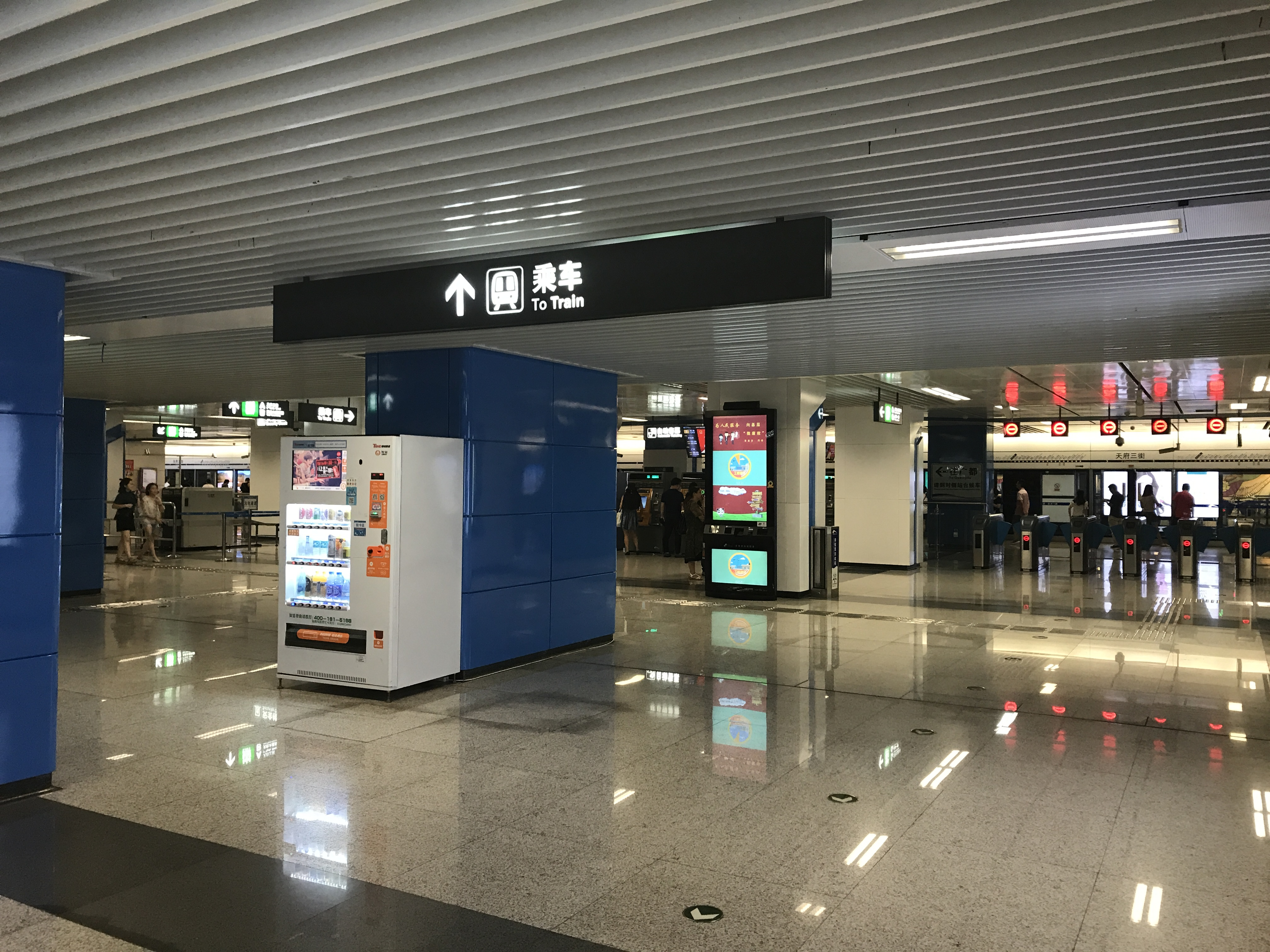
Concourse

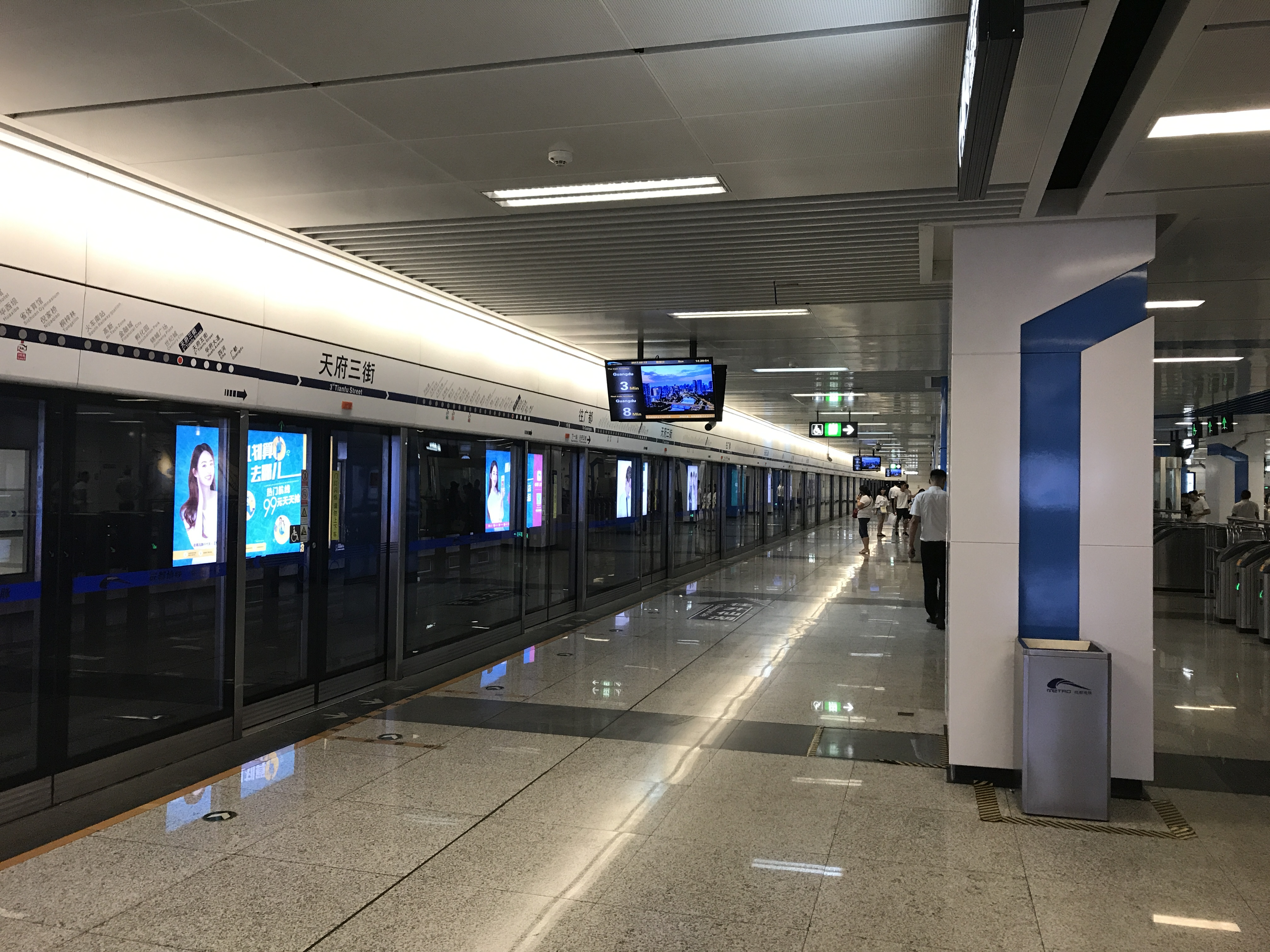
Platform
