= Line 9 (Chengdu Metro) =

Metro line in Chengdu, China

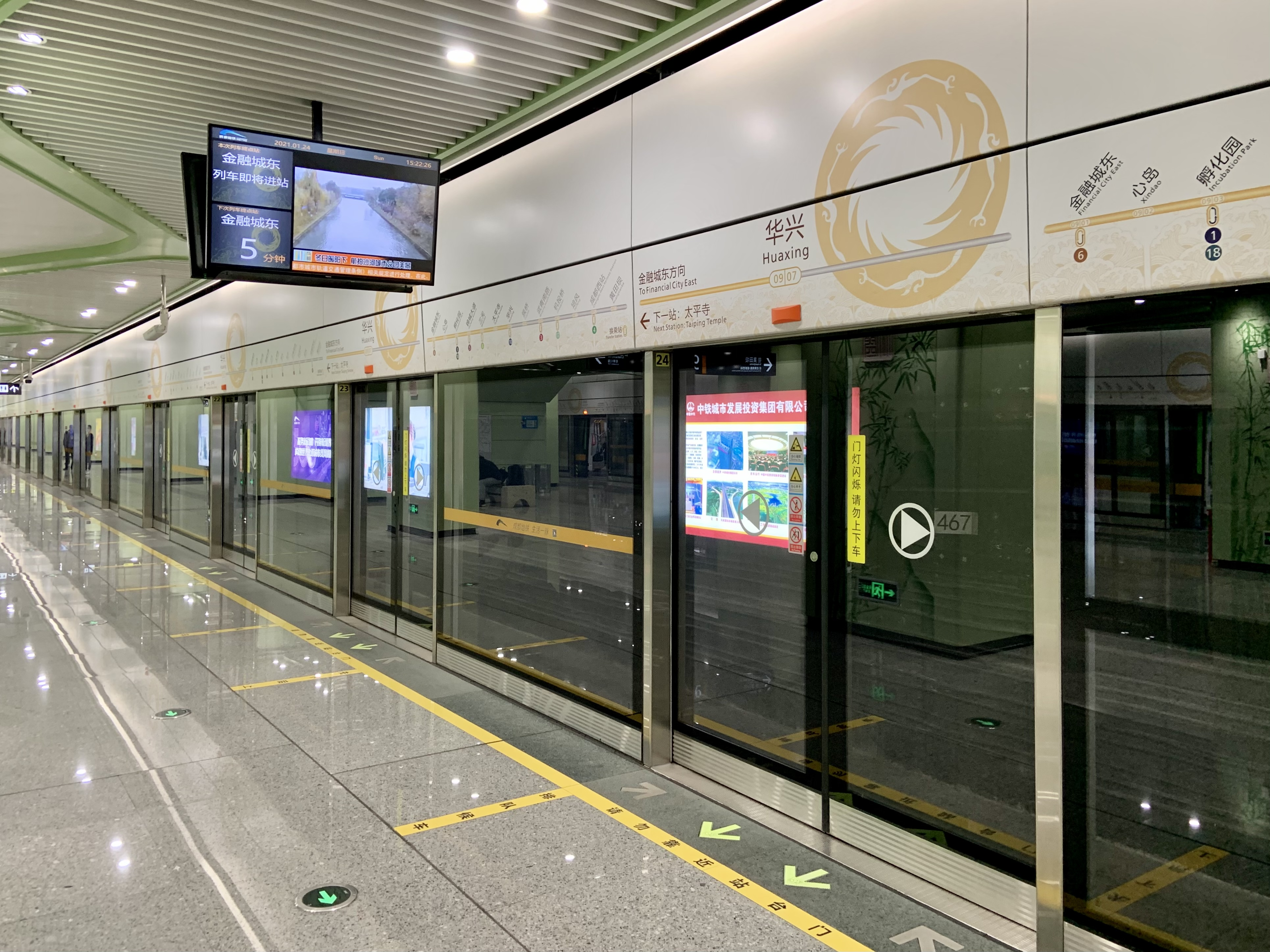
- Line 9 platform at Huaxing station

Overview
- Status: Operational
- Owner: City of Chengdu
- Locale: Chengdu, Sichuan
- Termini: Financial City East; Huangtianba
- Stations: 13

Service
- Type: Rapid transit
- System: Chengdu Metro
- Operator(s): Chengdu Metro Corporation
- Depot(s): Yuanhua Depot (元华停车场); Wuqing Depot (武青车辆段)
- Rolling stock: 8-car Type A (Driverless)

History
- Opened: 18 December 2020; 5 years ago

Technical
- Line length: 22.18 km (13.8 mi)
- Number of tracks: 2
- Character: Underground and elevated
- Electrification: overhead lines, 1,500 V DC
- Operating speed: 140km/h

Chengdu Metro Line 9 (simplified Chinese: 成都地铁9号线; traditional Chinese: 成都地鐵9號線) is located in Chengdu, Sichuan and forms an extension to the existing Chengdu Metro system. The line officially opened on 18 December 2020.

Line 9 Phase I runs from Financial City East to Huangtianba and is envisioned to be the second loop line in Chengdu (after Line 7) in the future. Line 9's color is bright orange.

It is the first ever fully automated ATO GoA 4 metro line in Chengdu.

Line 9 uses high capacity Type A 8-car trains. The 13 stations were designed by London-based Sepanta in collaboration with Chinese architect Jiang & Associates Design.

== Progress ==
- On July 11, 2016, the NDRC approved the third phase of expansion for the Chengdu Metro consisting of Line 6 phase 2 and 3, Line 8, Line 9, Line 10 Phase 2, Line 17 Phase 1 and Line 18.
- 2016-12-29, Sichuan and the Sichuan Development and Reform Commission approved and officially agreed to construct Line 1 Phase 1. The first 4 stations started construction on the same day.
- 2017-11-10, Line 9's first tunnel machine started work at Yuanhua Depot connection.
- 2018-3-17, Line 9's first section (Yuanhua Depot connection) finished tunnel work
- 2018-11-29, Line 9 started track-laying.
- 2019-01-22, first train is finished at CRRC Changchun Railway Vehicles.
- On July 18, 2019, the Wuqing Power Centre project is completed.
- 2019-07-30, Line 9 finished all tunnel work.
- 2020-01-14, as the last section of track is installed between Sanyuan and Jincheng Avenue Stations, completing track installation of Line 9 Phase I.
- 2020-06-10, Chengdu Metro started 3-month trial operation for Line 9 and Line 17.

== Stations ==
Station №	Station name		Transfer	Distance km		Location
Station №	English	Chinese	Transfer	Distance km		Location
0901	Financial City East	金融城东	6	--	0.000	Jinjiang
0902	Xindao	心岛		1.257	1.257	Wuhou
0903	Incubation Park	孵化园	1 18	0.645	1.902	Wuhou
0904	Jincheng Avenue	锦城大道	5	1.557	3.459	Wuhou
0905	Sanyuan	三元	8	2.532	5.991	Wuhou
0906	Taiping Temple	太平寺		1.794	7.785	Wuhou
0907	Huaxing	华兴	10	1.442	9.227	Wuhou
0908	Cuqiao	簇桥		1.616	10.843	Wuhou
0909	Wuqing South Road	武青南路	3	1.702	12.545	Wuhou
0910	Jitouqiao	机投桥	17	2.766	15.311	Wuhou
0911	Peifeng	培风	13	1.671	16.982	Wuhou
0912	Chengdu West Railway Station	成都西站	4 CMW T2	2.640	19.622	Qingyang
0913	Huangtianba	黄田坝		1.826	21.448	Qingyang
