= World center =

World center or world centre (British English) may refer to:

- Global city, a very large city central to world finance and culture
- New Century Global Center, Chengdu, China, one of the world's largest buildings by volume and floor area
- Miami Worldcenter, a new high rise neighborhood and shopping district in Miami, Florida.
