= Tianfu New Area =

Tianfu 天府新区
- State-level new area
- Sichuan Tianfu New Area
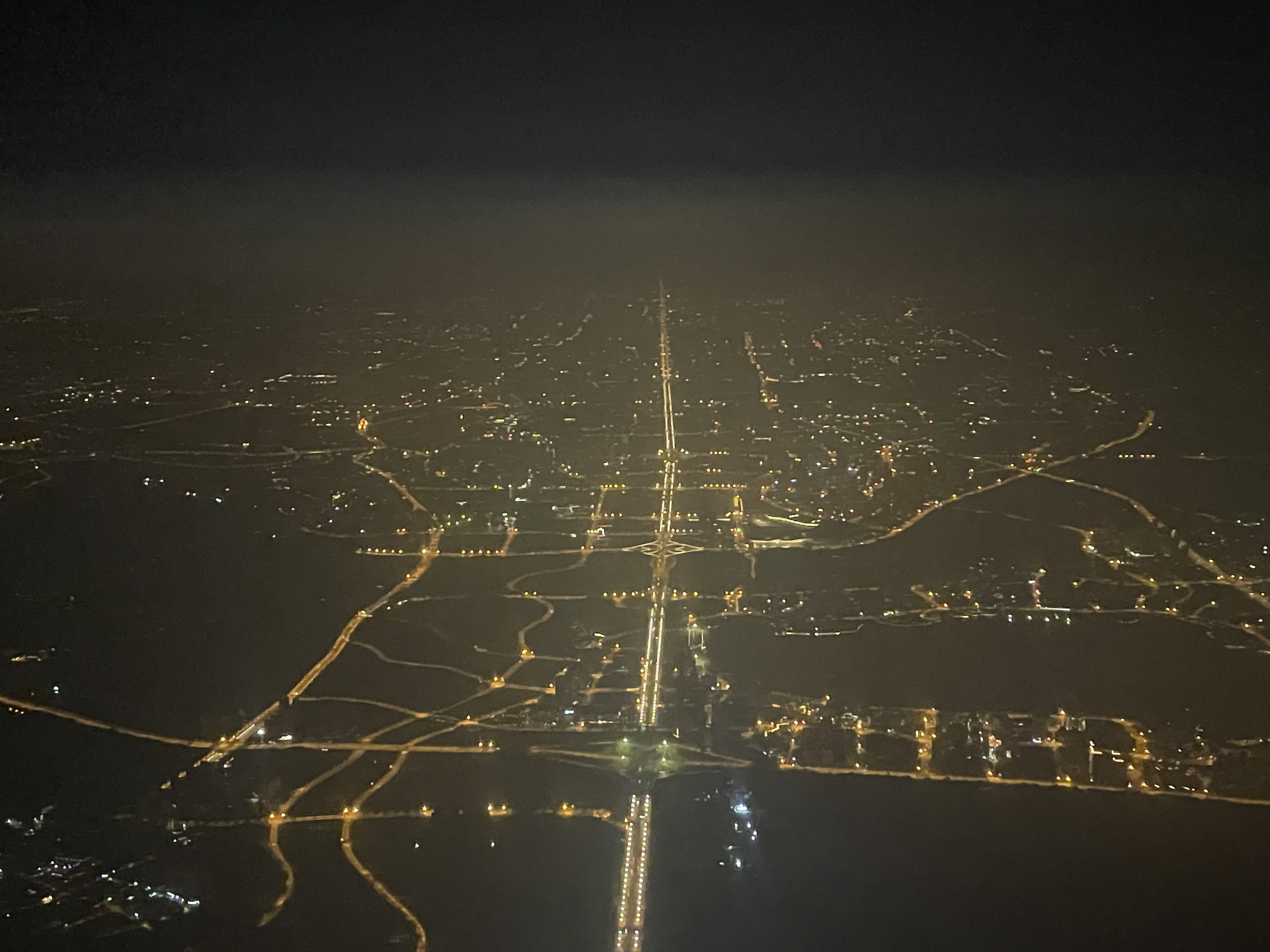
- Interactive map of Tianfu
- Coordinates (Tianfu government affairs service center): 30°30′06″N 104°04′09″E
- Country: People's Republic of China
- Province: Sichuan
- Sub-provincial city: Chengdu

Area
  - Total: 1,578 km^{2} (609 sq mi)
- Time zone: UTC+8 (China Standard)

Tianfu New Area (Chinese: 天府新区; pinyin: Tiānfǔ Xīnqū) is a new area in Chengdu, Sichuan Province, China. It was officially incorporated as a district in December 2011. Chengdu Tianfu New Area aims to serve as a modern international urban area suitable for residence, industry and commerce. It focuses on modern manufacturing industry and high-end service clusters. The planning scope of Tianfu New Area includes the southern part of Chengdu High-tech Zone, Longquanyi District, Shuangliu County, Xinjin County, Jianyang City, Pengshan County of Meishan City and Renshou County. In total, it involves 3 cities, 7 counties (city, district) and 37 towns and villages, with a planned total area of 1,578 square kilometres.

It is understood that the first 84 projects of Chengdu Tianfu New Area include 51 industry projects with the investment of 169.5 billion RMB (including 27 industrial projects with an investment of 82.35 billion RMB and 24 service projects with an investment of 87.15 billion RMB), 29 infrastructure projects with an investment of 43.4 billion RMB, and 4 ecology projects with an investment of 1.5 billion RMB.

Major projects in the Tianfu New Area include the construction of the New Century Global Centre (opened July 2013), Chengdu Tianfu International Airport (opened June 2021), and the Chengdu Contemporary Arts Centre. Another major project is the 900-acre (5,463 mu) Meishan California Smart City (MCSC) development, which is focused on renewable energy, energy generation, distribution, storage, testing, inspection, and certification, and new technologies.

The first Legoland Theme Park in China, Legoland Sichuan, will be located in Meishan in 2025.

== Urban Planning and Infrastructure ==
Plans of development documents indicate that the expansion of the Tianfu New Area is centered on comprehensive transportation networks and environmental sustainability. The planned expansion of the road, rail, and light rail networks is intended to enhance connectivity with central Chengdu and the surrounding region, thereby facilitating the transportation of goods and commuters throughout southwestern China. Also, the area has witnessed the development of green corridors and landscaped public spaces to create a balance between urban development and environmental conservation. A study shows that sustainable development strategies in Tianfu New Area include meeting green building standards and employing environmental monitoring systems to reduce energy consumption.

In addition to the green space, the majority of sub-districts in Tianfu New Area have mixed-use layouts with commercial, residential, and cultural amenities intertwined. These layouts are intended to promote walking and reduce private car dependency by locating workplaces, housing, and entertainment activities near each other. Public transport hubs have been established near primary business districts to encourage the utilization of low-carbon modes of transport.

Proposed programs are intended to emphasize the employment of landscaped waterways and integrated stormwater management. Joint programs between research institutions and local authorities have been launched to pilot new air quality monitoring technologies and support smart-city projects. Programs listed in urban planning documents demonstrate an effort to reconcile with national guidelines requiring economic growth in conjunction with environmental stewardship.

== Economic Development ==
Tianfu New Area has been identified as a future advanced manufacturing center, technology industry, and high-end service center, as per national policy to drive industrial upgrades and innovation. Government efforts include preferential tax policies and business incubation programs for fields such as artificial intelligence, biomedicine, and clean energy. Such projects are meant to attract multinational corporations, new businesses, and research organizations, thereby enhancing the technological innovation capability of the Tianfu New Area.

International cooperation is also launched to facilitate economic growth. Several collaborative ventures and research partnerships have been established, benefiting local talent from international experience and creating bridges of knowledge.

In addition, regulators in Tianfu New Area are also aiming to encourage the growth of finance, logistics, and cultural tourism. New cultural and creative communities have arts festivals and art exhibitions, expecting to attract domestic and overseas tourists. Infrastructure development, such as the construction of multimodal transport hubs, has also been reported as part of efforts to enhance the connectivity of the region within China and globally.

Experts believe that these innovations could make Tianfu New Area a part of broader regional and global trade platforms. Although government forecasts anticipate continued economic growth, experts point out that there is a need for constant research and open evaluation to judge the effectiveness of existing policies in meeting environmental requirements and social demands.
