= Chengdu South railway station =

Railway and metro station in Chengdu, China

Chengdunan 成都南
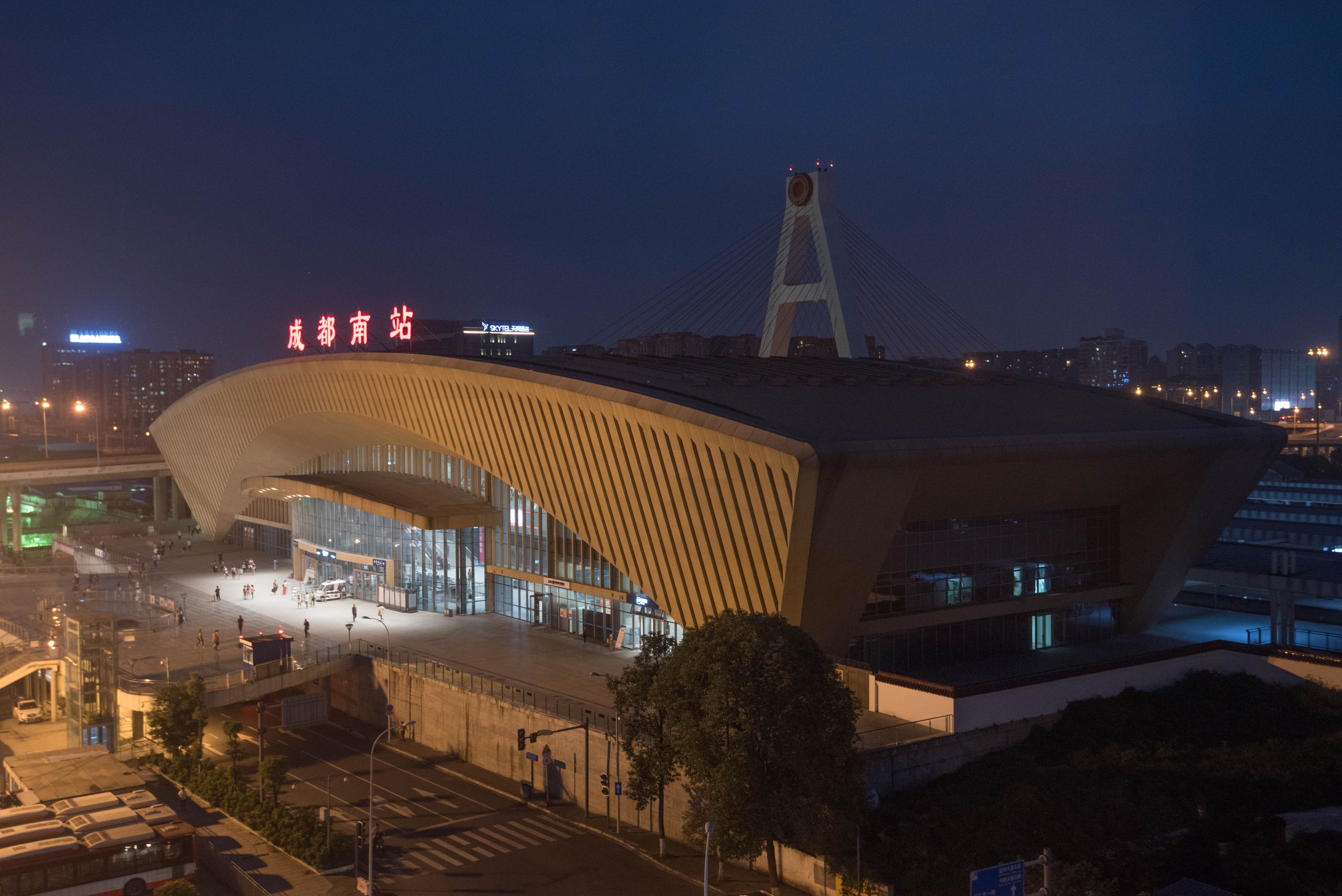

General information
- Other names: Chengdu South
- Location: Wuhou District, Chengdu, Sichuan; China
- Coordinates: 30°36′22″N 104°04′06″E
- Operated by: China Railway; Chengdu Railway Bureau
- Lines: Chengdu–Mianyang–Leshan intercity railway; Chengdu–Kunming railway
- Platforms: 9 (4 island platforms, 1 side platform)

Other information
- Station code: TMIS code: 47675; Telegraph code: CNW; Pinyin code: CDN
- Classification: 3rd class station
Location

Chengdu South railway station, alternatively Chengdunan railway station (Chinese: 成都南站; pinyin: Chéngdūnán Zhàn), is a railway station in Wuhou District, Chengdu, the capital of Sichuan province, China. Services from this station include Chengdu–Mianyang–Leshan intercity railway. It is served by the South Railway Station on Chengdu Metro Line 1, Line 7 and Line 18.

== History ==
The station opened on 1 July 1970 along with the construction of the Chengdu–Kunming railway, and was constructed as a single-level station with a floor area of approximately 4,000 m^{2} (43,000 sq ft), serving both passenger and freight traffic. The daily passenger traffic was around 3,000, with the station able to accommodate 600 persons at a time.

On 8 May 2011, with the opening of the high-speed Chengdu East railway station, Chengdu South closed for renovations. However, during the 2012 chunyun, to relieve passenger burden on the other stations in the city, trains temporarily served Chengdu South. On 20 December 2014, with the opening of the Chengdu–Mianyang–Leshan intercity railway, the station reopened.

== Chengdu Metro ==
South Railway Station 火车南站
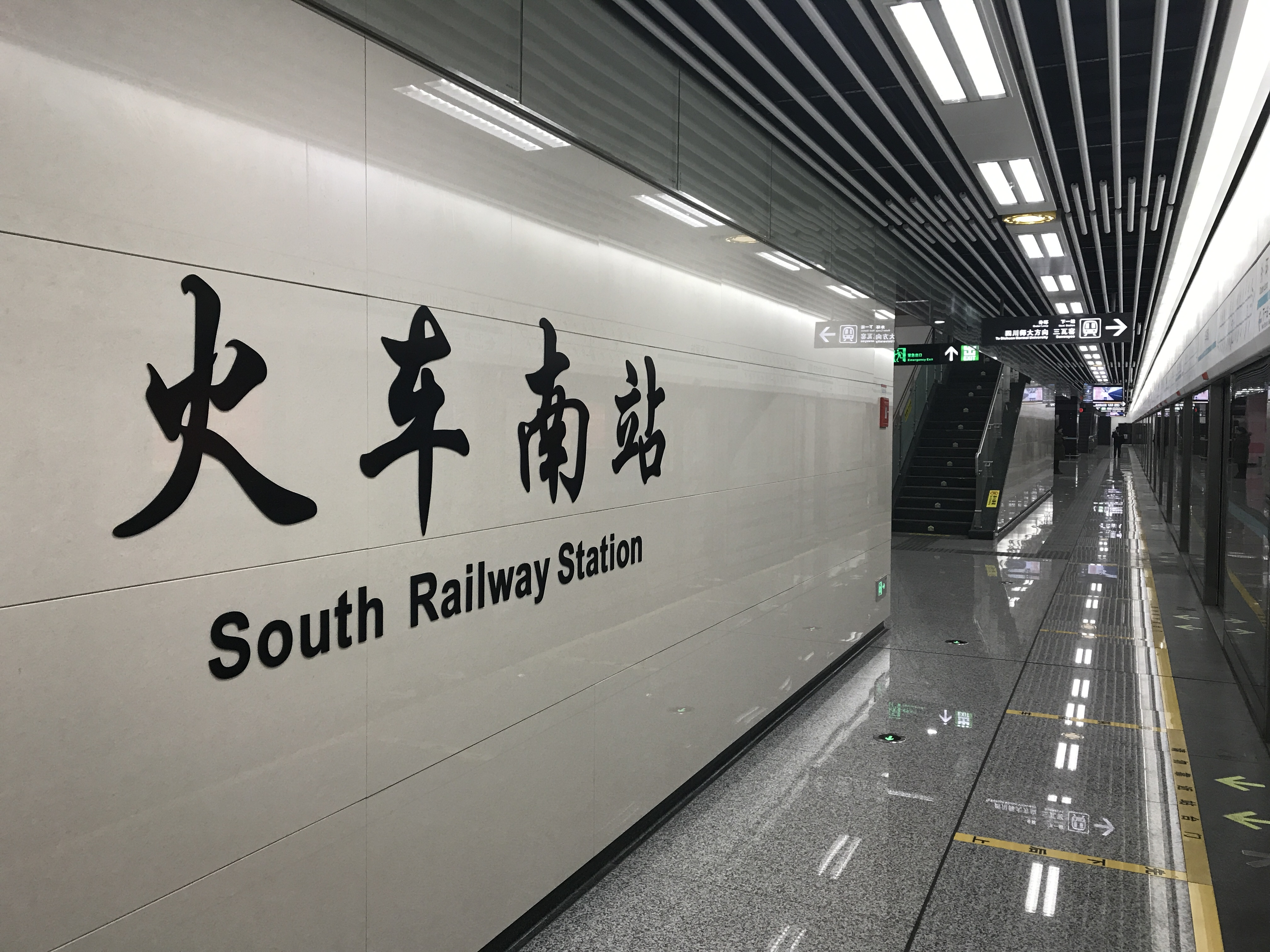

General information
- Location: Wuhou District, Chengdu, Sichuan; China
- Operated by: Chengdu Metro Limited
- Lines: Line 1 Line 7 Line 18
- Platforms: 8 (3 island platforms, 2 side platforms)

Other information
- Station code: 0113 0716 1805

History
- Opened: 27 September 2010

Services
Preceding station	Chengdu Metro	Following station
Tongzilin towards Weijianian	Line 1	Hi-Tech Zone towards Science City or Wugensong
Shenxianshu Clockwise	Line 7	Sanwayao Anticlockwise
Terminus	Line 18	Incubation Park towards Tianfu International Airport North
Location

South Railway Station (Chinese: 火车南站) is a transfer station on Line 1, Line 7 and Line 18 of the Chengdu Metro. It serves the Chengdu South railway station.

=== Station layout ===
G	Entrances and Exits	Exits A, B, D-H, J-L
B1	Concourse	Faregates, Station Agent
B2	Northbound	← Line 1 towards Weijianian (Tongzilin)
B2	Island platform, doors open on the left
B2	Southbound	Line 1 towards Science City (Hi-Tech Zone) →
B3	Side platform, doors open on the right
B3	Clockwise	← Line 7 to Shenxianshu
B3	Island platform, doors open on the left
B3	Counterclockwise	Line 7 to Sanwayao →
B3	Side platform, doors open on the right
B4	Northbound	← Line 18 termination platform
B4	Island platform, doors open on the left
B4	Southbound	Line 18 towards Sancha (Incubation Park) →

=== Gallery ===
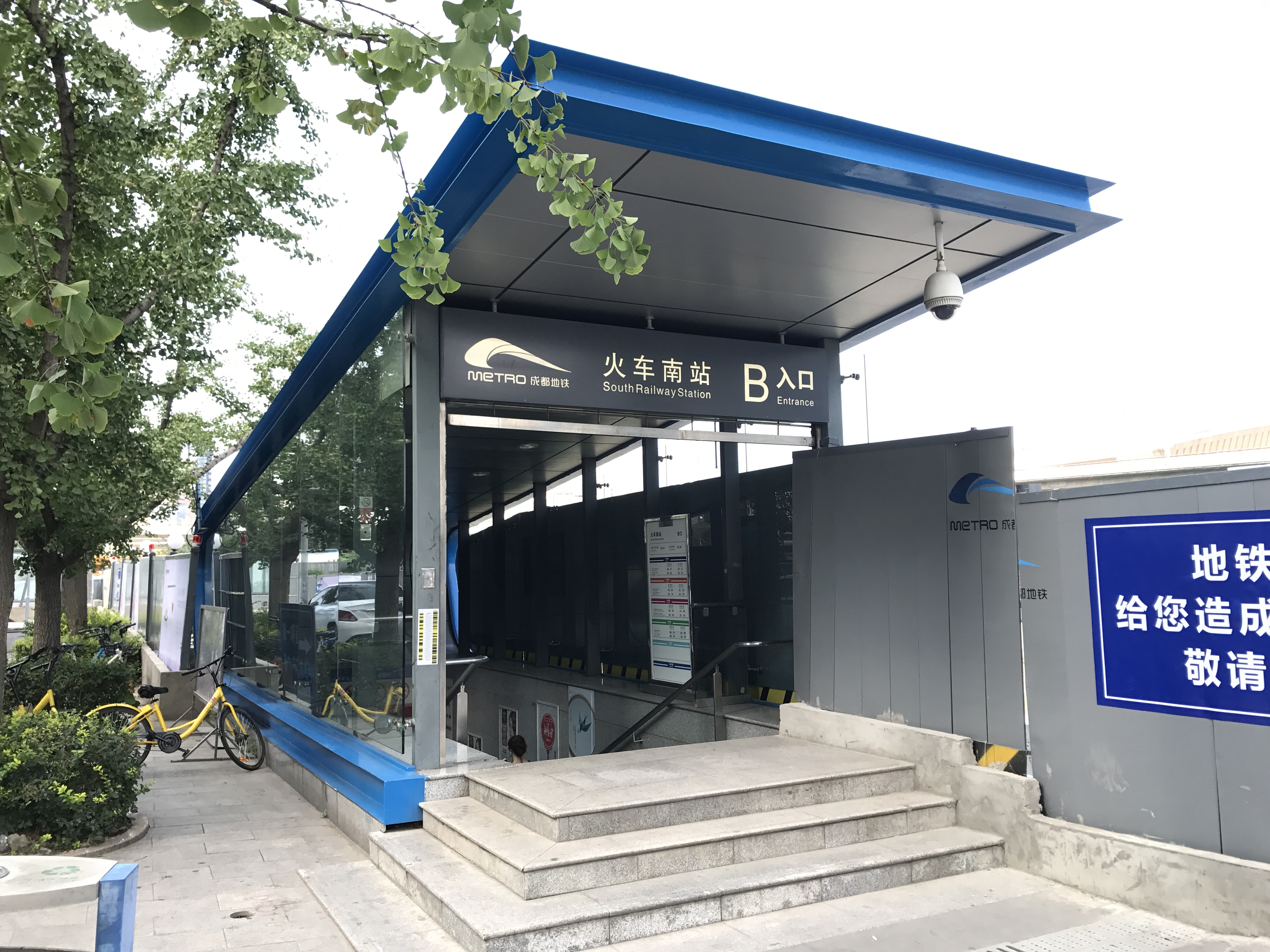
Entrance B

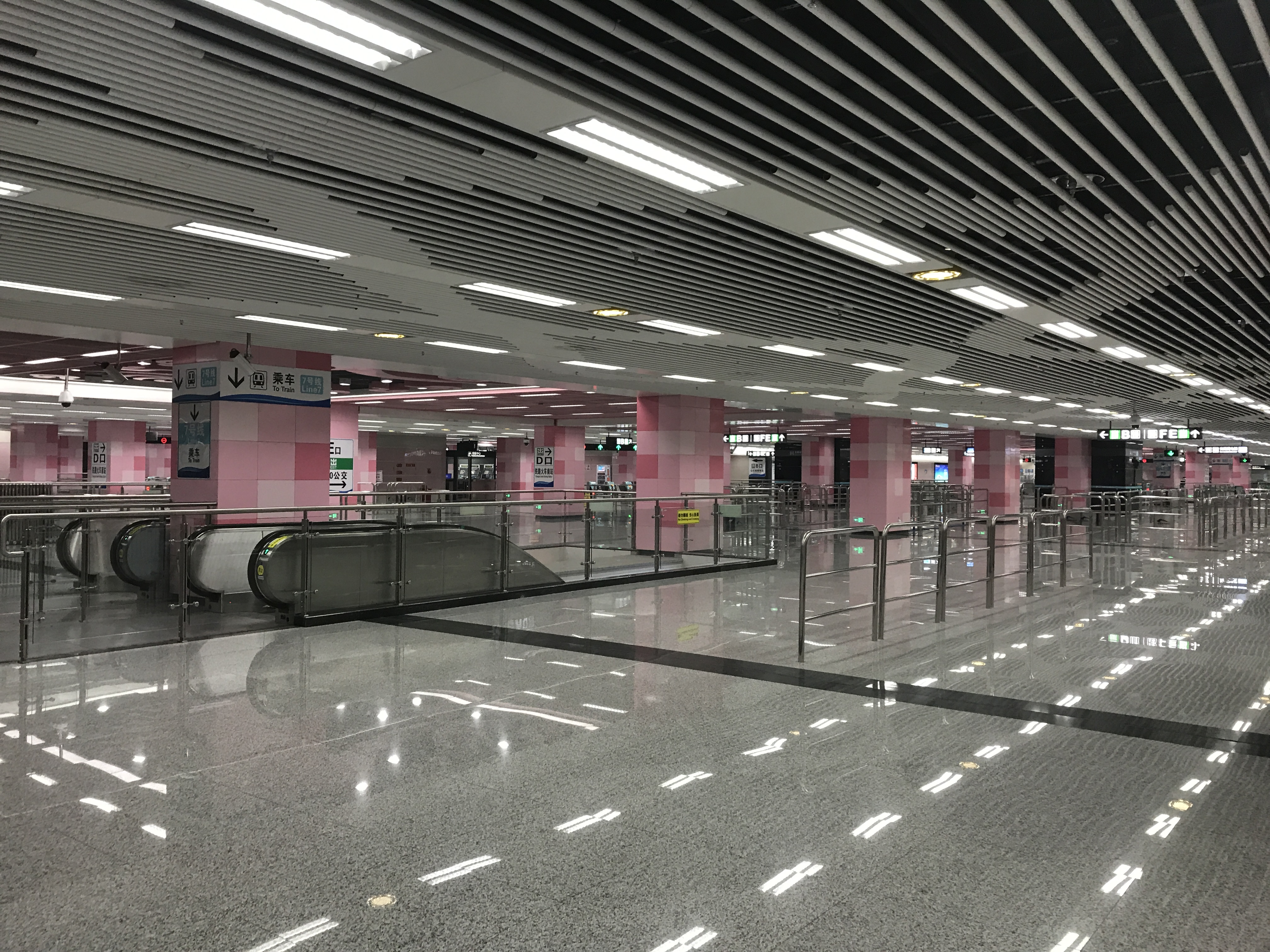
Concourse

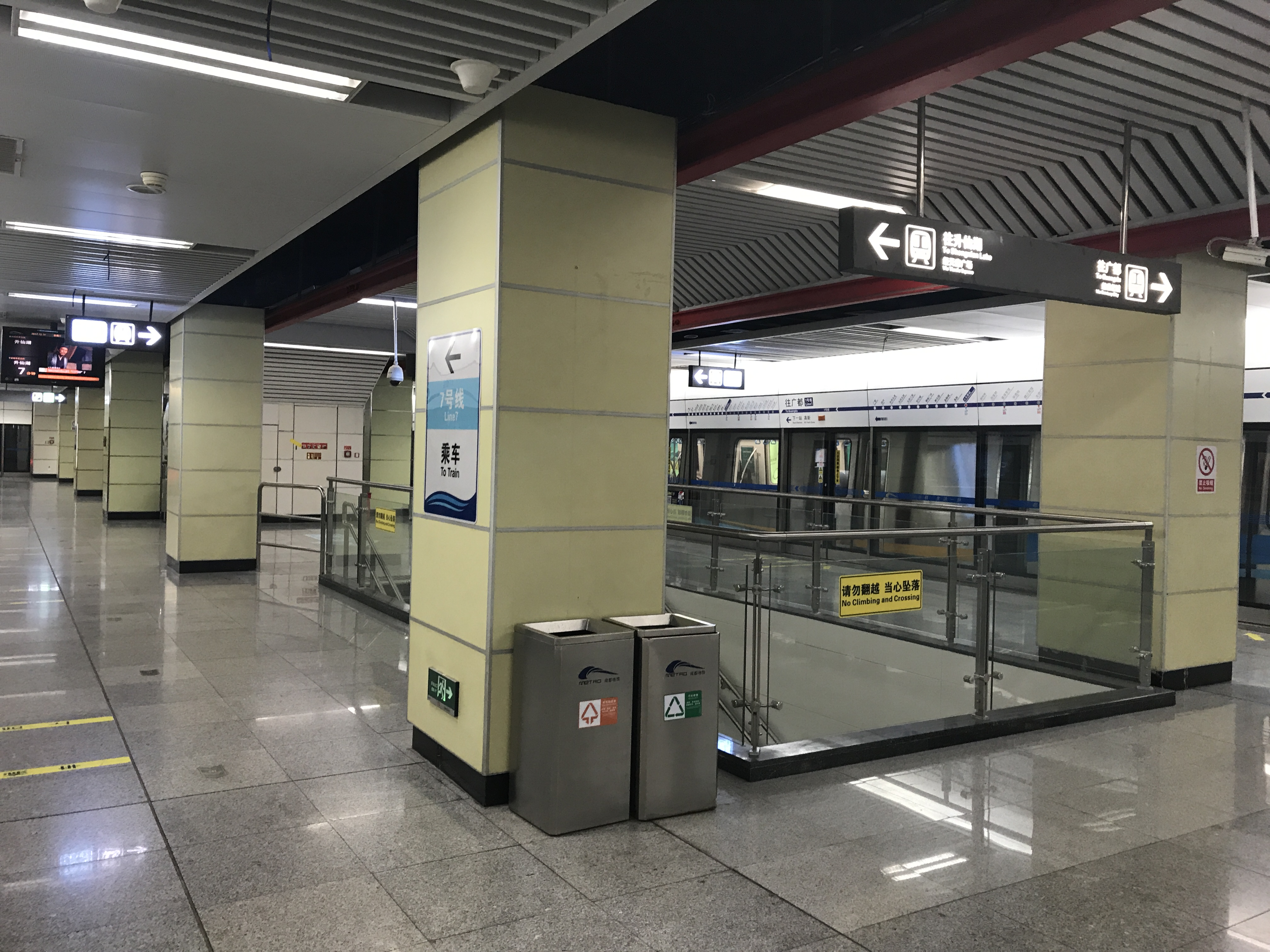
Line 1 platform

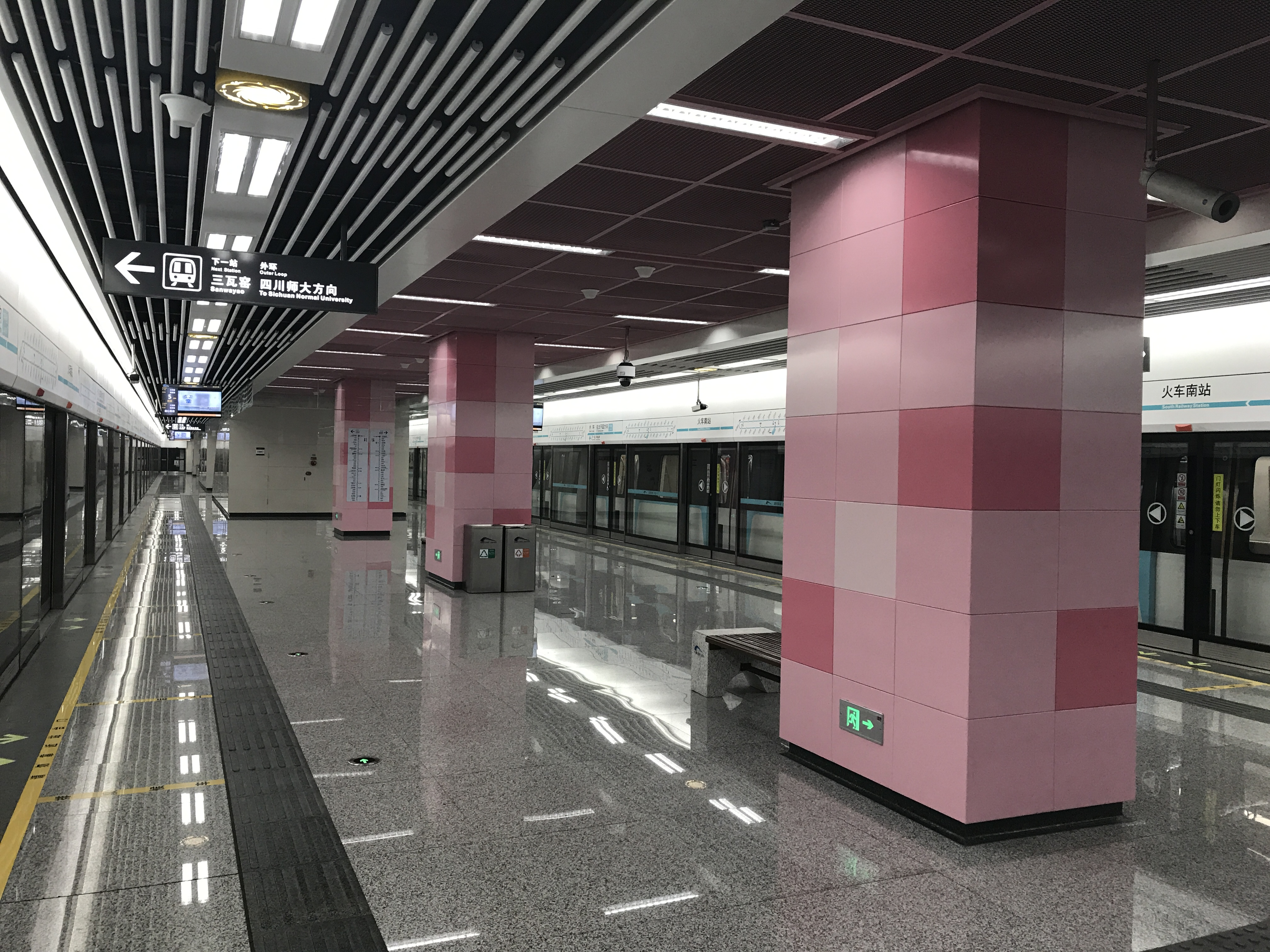
Line 7 platform

Preceding station	China Railway	Following station
Chengdu East towards Chengdu	Chengdu–Kunming railway	Shuangliu towards Kunming
Preceding station	China Railway High-speed	Following station
Terminus	Chengdu–Chongqing intercity railway	Jianyang South towards Chongqing
Chengdu East towards Jiangyou	Chengdu–Mianyang–Leshan intercity railway	Shuangliu Airport towards Leshan or Emeishan
