= New Century Global Center =

Multipurpose building complex in Chengdu, Sichuan, China

- 新世纪环球中心
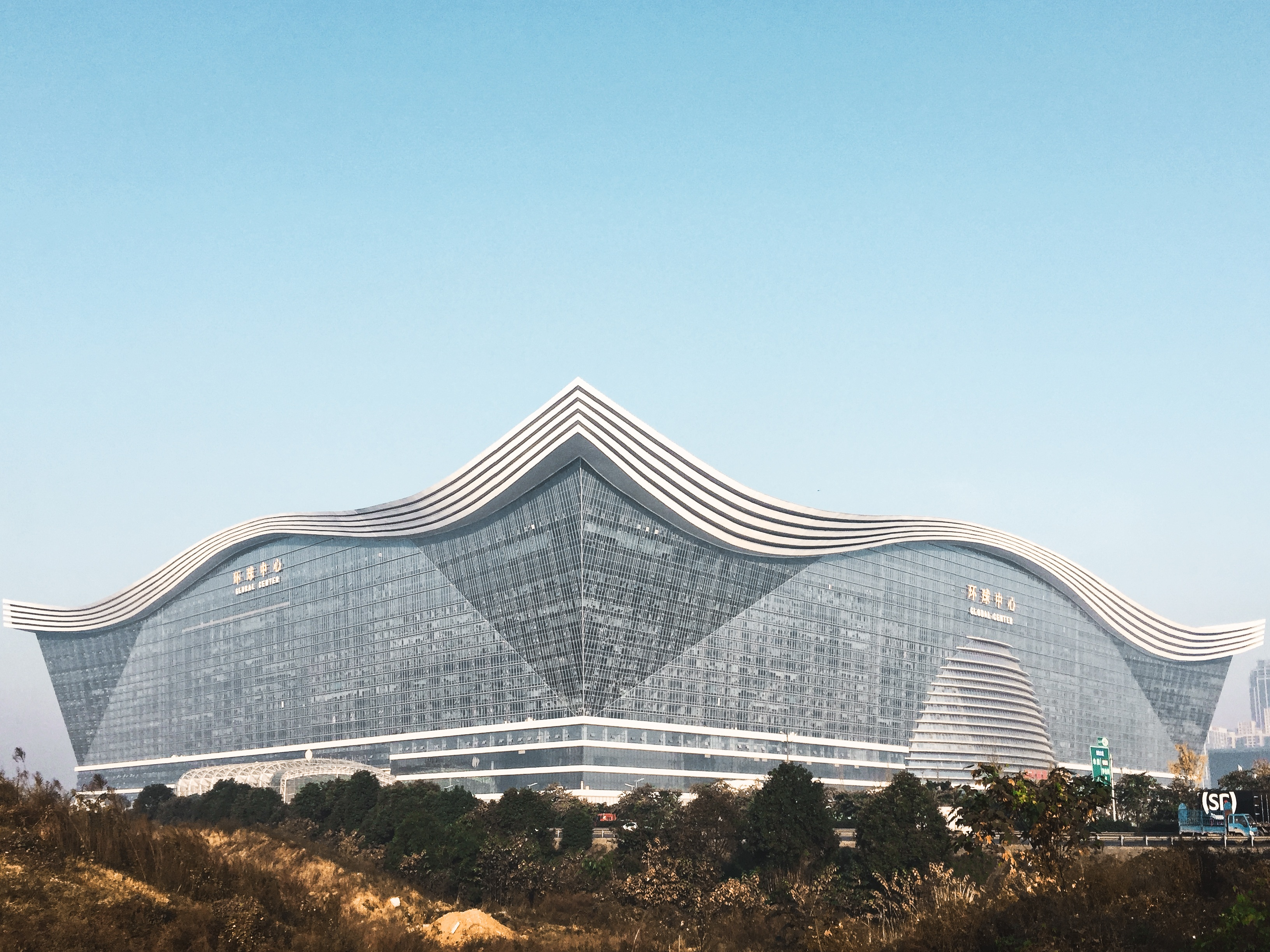
- New Century Global Center in 2015

General information
- Status: Completed
- Location: Tianfu New Area, Chengdu, Sichuan, China
- Coordinates: 30°34′16″N 104°3′38″E
- Construction started: 2010
- Completed: 2013
- Opening: 1 July 2013

Height
- Architectural: 100 m (328 ft)

Technical details
- Floor area: 1,700,000 m^{2} (18,298,648 ft^{2})

Chinese name
- Simplified Chinese: 新世纪环球中心
- Traditional Chinese: 新世紀環球中心
Transcriptions
Standard Mandarin
- Hanyu Pinyin: Xīnshìjì Huánqiú Zhōngxīn
- Bopomofo: ㄒㄧㄣ ㄕˋ ㄐㄧˋ ㄏㄨㄢˊ ㄑㄧㄡˊ ㄓㄨㄥ ㄒㄧㄣ

New Century Global Center (Chinese: 新世纪环球中心), commonly known as Global Center (环球中心), is a multipurpose building complex in Tianfu New Area, Chengdu, Sichuan, China. It is the world's third-largest building by floor area. It is served by Jincheng Plaza station of Line 1 of the Chengdu Metro.

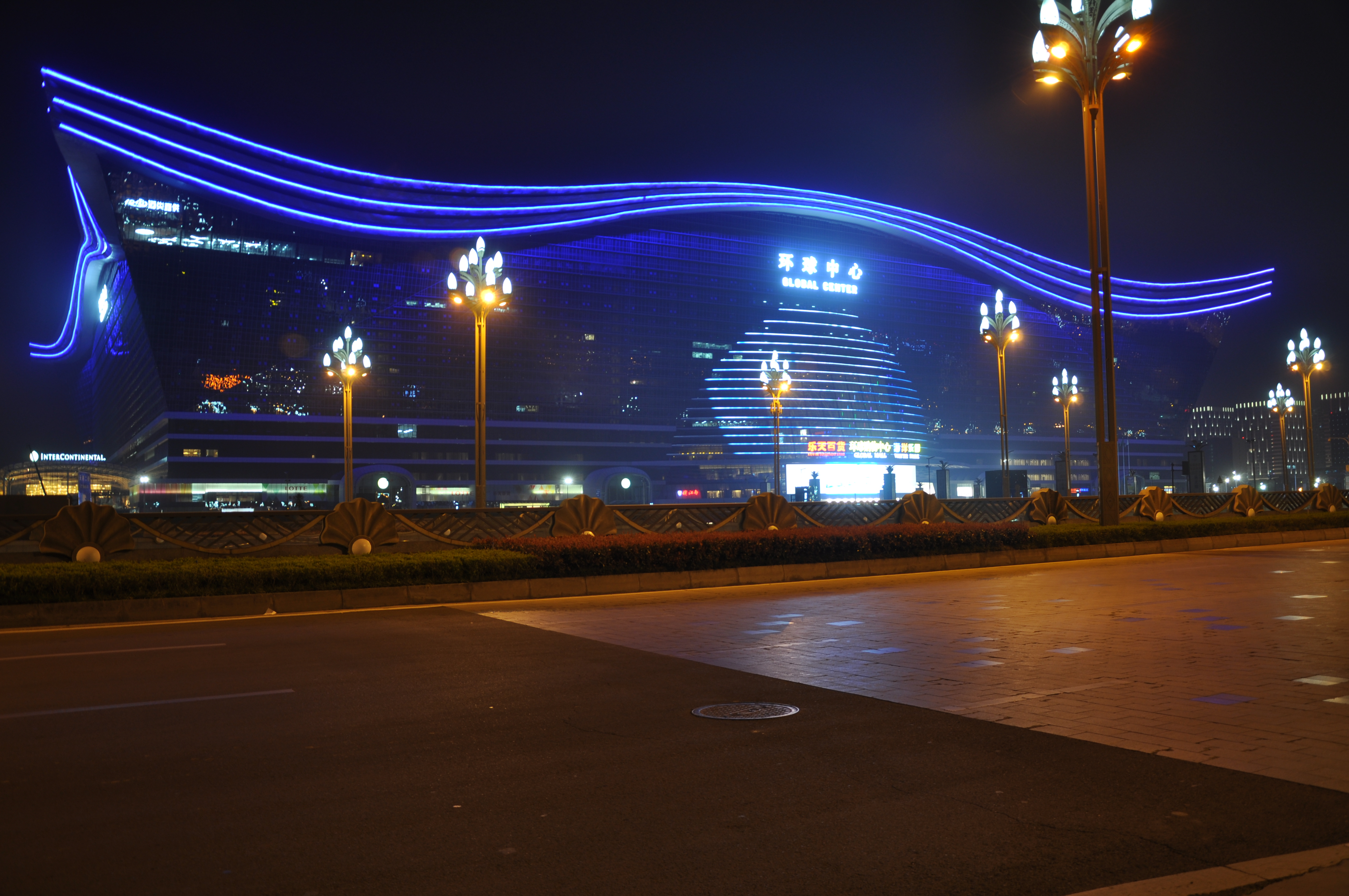
Night view of Global Center

== Size ==
The 100-metre (330 ft) tall structure has a 500-by-400-metre (1,640 by 1,312 ft) base with 1,700,000 m^{2} (18,298,648 ft^{2}) of floor space, making it the world's third-largest building measured by floor area.

== Development ==
Developed by billionaire Deng Hong's Entertainment and Travel Group (ETG), nearly 400,000 m^{2} (4,305,564 ft^{2}) of the building is devoted to shopping. It also houses offices, conference rooms, a university complex, two commercial centers, hotels, an IMAX cinema, a "Mediterranean village", a pirate ship and an Olympic-size skating rink. The centerpiece of the building is a water park ("Paradise Island Water Park"), containing a 5,000 m^{2} (53,820 ft^{2}) artificial beach, where a large 150 by 40 m (492 by 131 ft) screen forms the horizon to offer sunrises and sunsets. At night, a stage extends out over the pool for concerts. A stand has been built overlooking the pool with a food court and entrance underneath at the floor level. The new InterContinental Hotel will feature 1,009 rooms that are spread over 6 by 8 story blocks around the edge of the complex. The center is connected to Line 1 of the Chengdu Metro.

The building will eventually face the Chengdu Contemporary Arts Center, designed by Iraqi-British architect Zaha Hadid.

While the exact cost to build such a building remains undisclosed by the Chinese Government. Estimates put it between $8 and $10 Billion Dollars.

== Controversy ==
Although parts of the shopping area opened in early 2013, the center was supposed to have formally opened in March 2013 when it hosted the Global Fortune 500 conference. However, the businessman behind the project, Deng Hong, was arrested on corruption charges; further, "given the potential for political humiliation," the conference was moved to the Shangri-La Hotel in Chengdu.

The opening was delayed until 22 August 2013; it was then scaled back after the arrest of more than 50 local government officials being detained in a series of overlapping investigations.

== See also ==
- List of largest buildings
