= Wuhou, Chengdu =

Urban district of Chengdu, Sichuan, China

Wuhou 武侯区
- District
- District of Wuhou, City of Chengdu
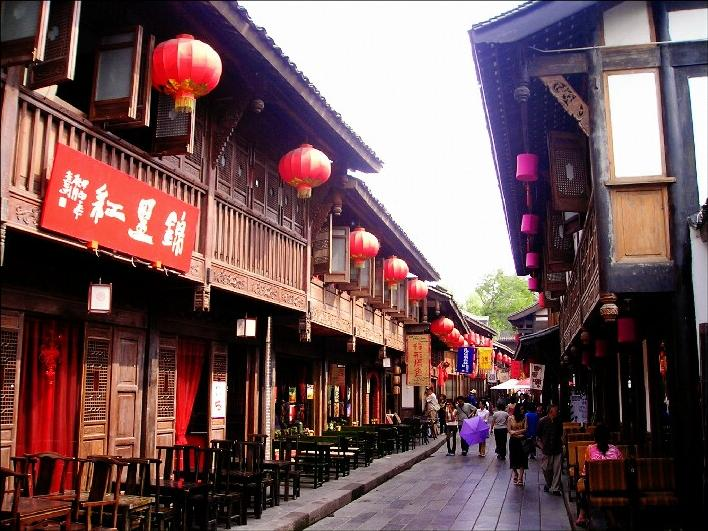
- Jinli Street near Wuhou Temple

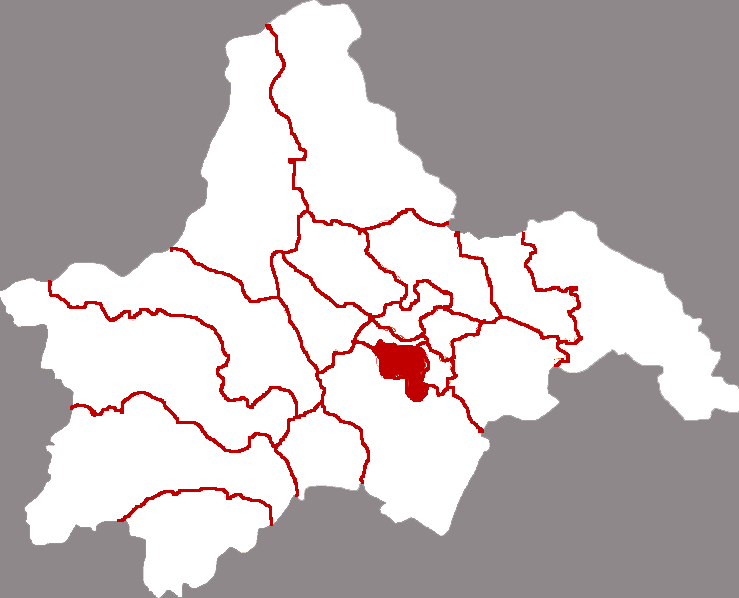
- Location of Wuhou in Chengdu

- Location in Sichuan Wuhou (China)
- Coordinates: 30°35′43″N 104°01′16″E
- Country: China
- Province: Sichuan
- Sub-provincial city: Chengdu
- District seat: Jiangxijie Subdistrict

Area
  - Total: 76.56 km^{2} (29.56 sq mi)

Population (2020 census)
  - Total: 1,855,186
  - Density: 24,230/km^{2} (62,760/sq mi)
- Time zone: UTC+8 (China Standard)
- Website: www.cdwh.gov.cn

Wuhou District (Chinese: 武侯区; pinyin: Wǔhóu Qū) is a central urban district of the City of Chengdu, capital of Sichuan, China.

Wuhou District contains the historic sites Wuhou Temple and Jinli Street. The district is bordered by Jinjiang District to the east, Shuangliu County to the south and west, and Qingyang District to the north.

== History ==
The Chengdu Plain, where Chengdu is located, has a long history of sericulture and silk reeling. Cotton weaving began in the Han Dynasty and is most famous for its Sichuan brocade. Cuqiao, located in Wuhou District, is considered to be one of the starting points of the Southern Silk Road and a center of Sichuan silk trading. The name of Cuqiao also comes from the silk trade. It was called Cocoon Bridge in the Tang and Song Dynasties, and later it was used to feed silkworms. The names for the foods (collectively called clusters) are still used today. Cuqiao was also a prosperous commercial town from the Han Dynasty to the Qing Dynasty. During the reign of King Zhao of Qin (256 BC - 251 BC), Li Bing, the governor of Shu, built the Changxing Bridge across the Jinjiang River at the old south gate in the north of today's Wuhou District. It became an important land passage connecting the south of the city and promoted local commerce. This bridge is also known as Wanli Bridge and Old South Gate Bridge. In the Qin Dynasty, Wuhou, this area was subordinate to Chengdu County, Shu County. In the Han Dynasty, it belonged to Chengdu County, Shu County, Yizhou.

Liu Bei died in the third year of Zhangwu of the Shu Han Dynasty (AD 223) and was buried in the Hui Mausoleum built in the southern suburbs of Chengdu (in Wuhou District). According to the system at that time, a temple was built to worship Liu Bei, namely the Han Zhaolie Temple. During the Southern and Northern Dynasties (around the 5th century AD), people moved the ancestral hall dedicated to Zhuge Liang in Shaocheng, Chengdu, to Huiling and next to the Han Zhaolie Temple, forming the predecessor of the present Wuhou Temple. From the 23rd to the 24th year of Hongwu in the Ming Dynasty, Zhu Chun, the king of Shu, merged the Wuhou Temple dedicated to worshiping Zhuge Liang with the Tomb of Han Zhaolie and Huiling, forming a three-in-one situation.

The urban center of Chengdu was originally divided into East City District, West City District and Jinniu District. In September 1990, with the approval of the State Council, the zoning of downtown Chengdu was adjusted, and Wuhou District, named after the Wuhou Temple in the territory, was created. On January 1, 1991, the Wuhou District People's Government officially opened to the public.

== Geography ==
=== Relevant location ===
Wuhou District is located in the southwest of the central city of Chengdu, adjacent to Qingyang District to the north, Shuangliu District and Chengdu High-tech Zone to the south, Shuangliu District to the west, and Jinjiang District across the river to the east. Wuhou District is located between 30°34′-30°39′ north latitude and 103°56′-104°05′ east longitude. It is about 13 kilometers long from east to west and 10 kilometers wide from north to south. The district's land area is 75.36 square kilometers.

=== Geology and landforms ===
The terrain of Wuhou District is flat, sloping from northwest to southeast, with an average altitude of 502.5 meters. The plains within the territory are composed of flood plains, alluvial fans, fan plains and other plains. The geological structure of the entire region is mainly Quaternary loose accumulations.

=== Climate ===
Wuhou District has a humid mid-subtropical monsoon climate, with an average annual temperature ranging from 16°C to 18.6°C. July is the hottest month, with average temperatures ranging from 24.9°C to 26.1°C and extreme daily high temperatures ranging from 24°C to 38.7°C.

== Subdistricts ==
Wuhou District has 15 subdistricts:

- Jiangxijie Subdistrict 浆洗街街道
- Wangjianglu Subdistrict 望江路街道
- Yulin Subdistrict 玉林街道
- Huochenanzhan Subdistrict 火车南站街道
- Jinyang Subdistrict 晋阳街道
- Hongpailou Subdistrict 红牌楼街道
- Cuqiao Subdistrict 簇桥街道
- Jitouqiao Subdistrict 机投桥街道
- Jinhuaqiao Subdistrict 金花桥街道
- Cujin Subdistrict 簇锦街道
- Huaxing Subdistrict 华兴街道
- Fangcaojie Subdistrict 芳草街街道
- Xiaojiahe Subdistrict 肖家河街道
- Shiyang Subdistrict 石羊街道
- Guixi Subdistrict 桂溪街道

Among them, Fangcaojie Subdistrict, Xiaojiahe Subdistrict, Shiyang Subdistrict, and Guixi Subdistrict are managed by the Chengdu High-tech Zone Management Committee.
