= Haichang Road station =

Metro station in Chengdu, China

Haichang Road 海昌路
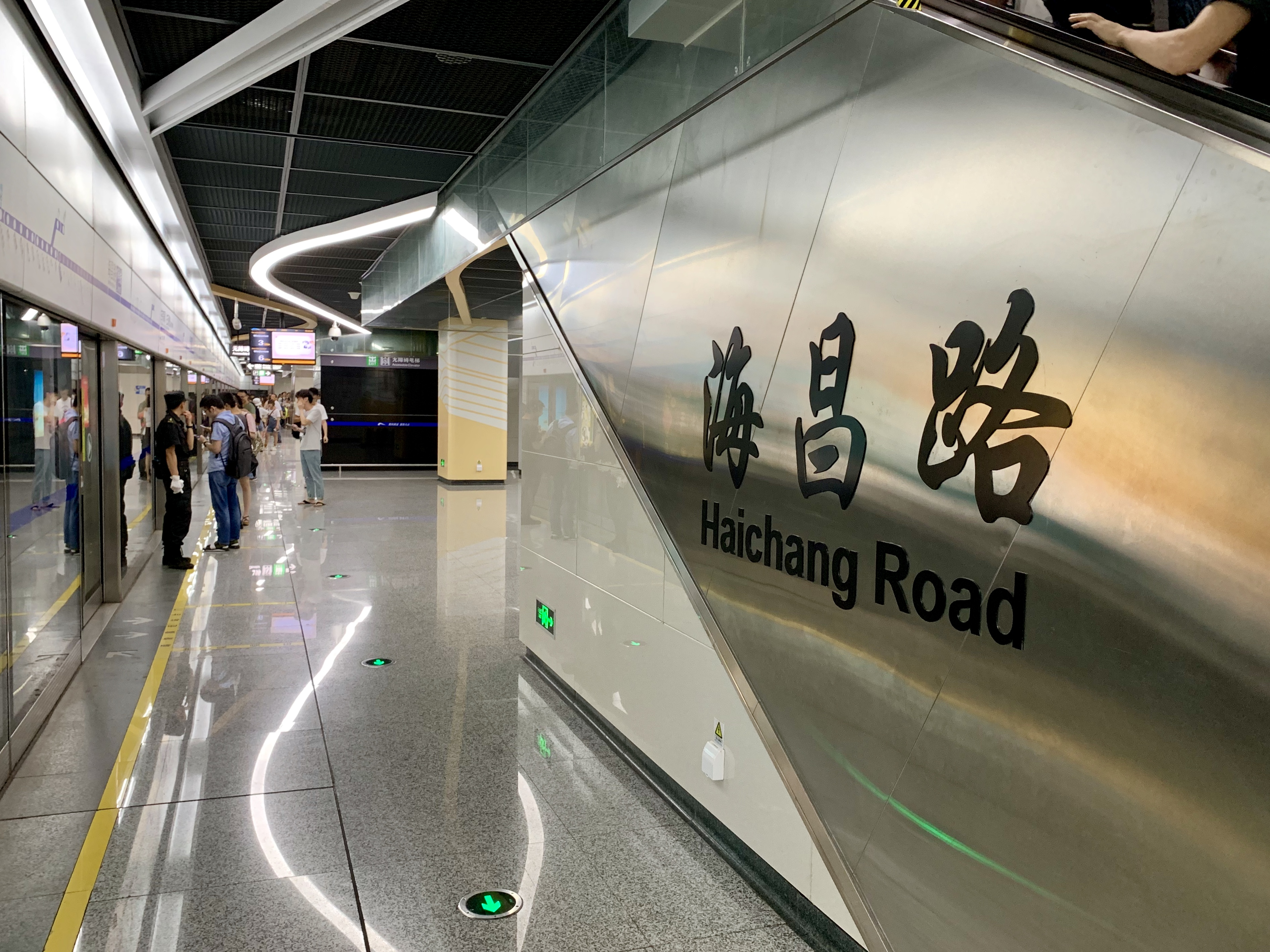
- Line 1 platform

General information
- Location: Shuangliu District, Chengdu, Sichuan; China
- Coordinates: 30.4973°N 104.0699°E
- Operated by: Chengdu Metro Limited
- Lines: Line 1 Line 18
- Platforms: 6 (3 island platforms)

Other information
- Station code: 0124 1809

History
- Opened: 18 March 2018

Services
Preceding station	Chengdu Metro	Following station
Huayang towards Weijianian	Line 1	Guangfu towards Science City
Century City towards South Railway Station	Line 18	Western China Int'l Expo City towards Tianfu International Airport North
Location

Haichang Road (Chinese: 海昌路) is a station on Line 1 and Line 18 of the Chengdu Metro in China.

== Station layout ==
G	Entrances and Exits	Exits A-F
B1	Concourse	Faregates, Station Agent
B2	Northbound	← Line 18 express trains towards South Railway Station (Incubation Park)
B2	Island platform
B2	Northbound	← Line 18 local trains towards South Railway Station (Century City)
B2	Southbound	Line 18 local trains towards Tianfu International Airport North (Western China Int'l Expo City) →
B2	Island platform
B2	Southbound	Line 18 express trains towards Tianfu International Airport North (Sancha) →
B2	Northbound	← Line 1 towards Weijianian (Huayang)
B2	Island platform, doors open on the left
B2	Southbound	Line 1 towards Science City (Guangfu) →

== Gallery ==
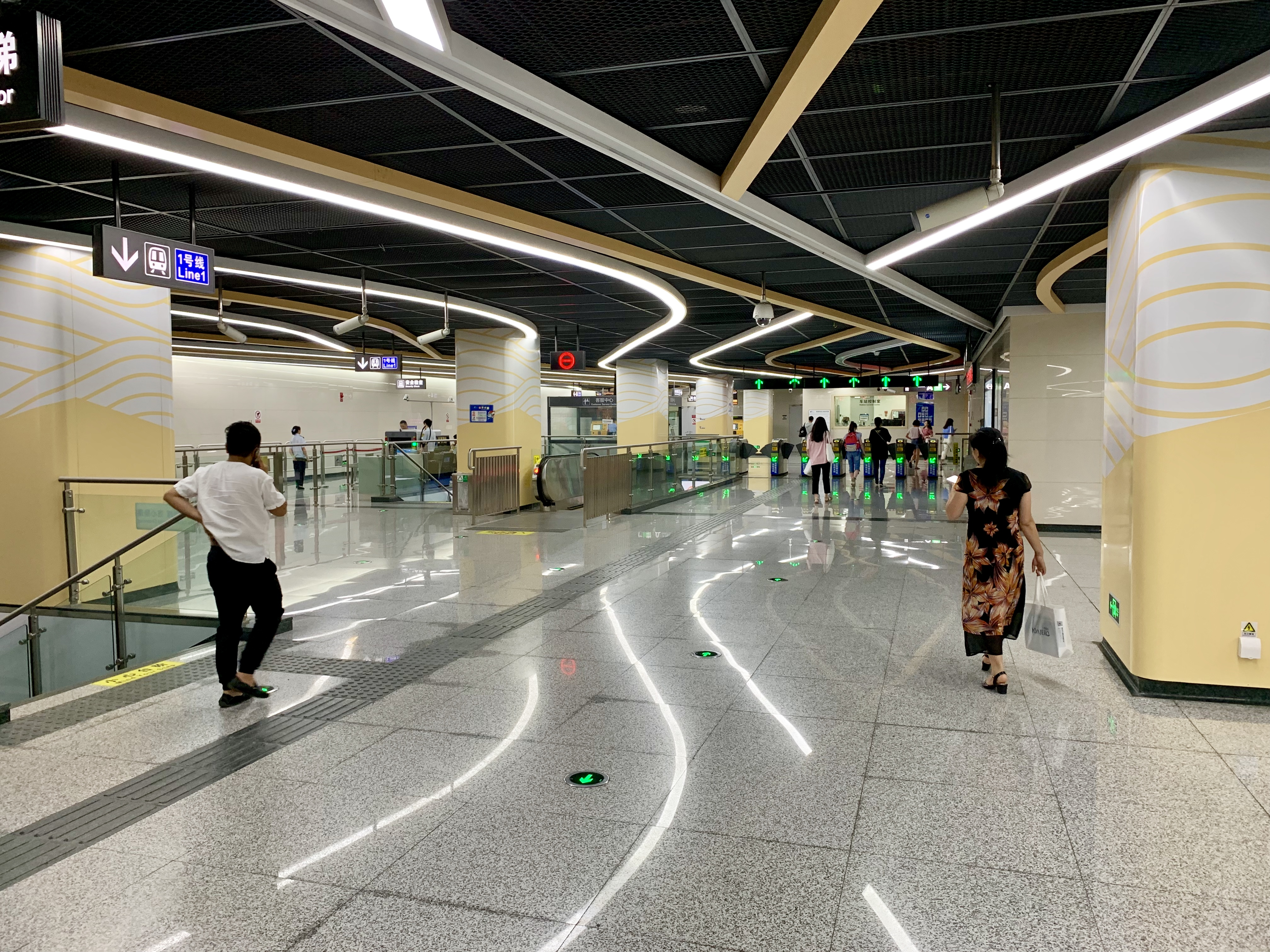
Line 1 Concourse

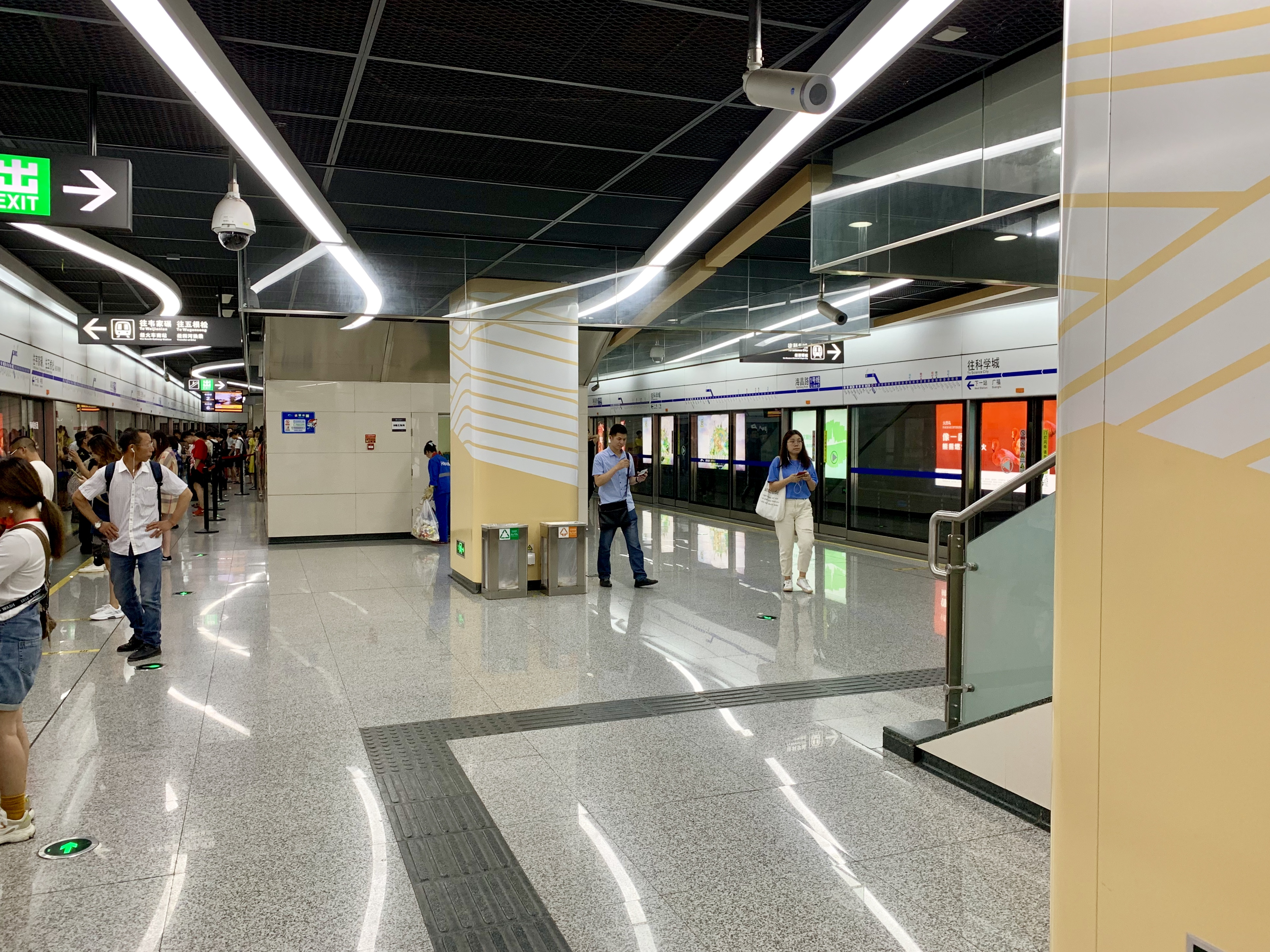
Line 1 Platform
