= Line S5 (Chengdu Metro) =

Rapid transit line under construction in Chengdu and Meishan, China

Line S5 of the Chengdu Metro (Chinese: 成都地铁S5线) also known as Chengdu-Meishan Line (成都至眉山线) and shortened as Chengmei Line (成眉线) or Meishan Line (眉山线), is a metro line in Chengdu, China. The line starts from Honglian station in Tianfu New Area, Chengdu, and ends at Meishan East Railway Station in Dongpo District, Meishan. The line is 59 km long, has 5 underground stations and 8 elevated stations. Construction started on September 26, 2022, and is expected to open in 2027.

== History ==
=== 2014 ===
- Line 1 Phase 3's Western China International Expo City station released a transit hub design, announcing Line S5's future station would be transferring to the Expo City station with Line 1, Line 6, and Line 18. Line S5 was to be located on the LG2 floor.

=== 2016 ===
- Western China International Expo City station had completed the Line S5's platform and structural construction with all 4 lines in the station. However, it was later announced Line S5 would not to go to Western China International Expo City station, and would instead pass through Line 6's Qinhuangsi Station, and Line 19's Honglian Station.

=== 2020 ===
- August 4: Chengdu and Meishan signed the "Chengmei Municipal Railway Line S5 Co-construction and Co-management Cooperation Agreement," detailing that Line S5 would have a branch line and a main line. The main line would be 50.4 km long (with the Chengdu section being 19.4 km and the Meishan section 31 km), costing 15.6 billion yuan, and the branch line would be 32.8 km, costing 9.7 billion yuan. The whole line was planned to be 83.2 km long and cost 25.3 billion yuan.

=== 2021 ===
- September 26: Sichuan Chengmei Rail Transit Co., Ltd, the operating company of Line S5, was officially established. The company's shares are jointly held by Meishan State-owned Capital Investment and Operation Group Co. Ltd., and Chengdu Metro, which hold 54.8% and 45.2% of shares respectively.
- December 12: By NDRC's publication, the Chengdu-Chongqing Multi-layer Transit Plan had been delivered to Chengdu and Chongqing, showing that the line starts at Honglian station, Line 19, Tianfu New Area, Chengdu, and ends at Meishan East Railway Station (Metro & National Railway), Dongpo, Meishan. It also showed the line would pass through Science City, Legoland Sichuan, Heilongtan, and Mindong New Area.
- December 29: Chengdu Metro published Chengdu-Meishan Line Field Assessment Bidding. The assessment shows the line is 58 km long (Chengdu: 19.22 km, Meishan: 8.78 km), underground: 8.65 km, elevated: 43.49 km, ground level: 5.86 km. It also details the line's 12 stations, with Jiancha Depot and Meishanbei Depot, and 2 power centres.

=== 2022 ===
- August 26: Line S5 started project bidding.
- September 26: Line S5 conducted a construction initiation ceremony at Qinhuangsi and Shigao Station.
- September 26: Line S5's bidding result is announced, with China Electric Power Construction Co., Ltd. as the winner.
- October 15: Fencing was finished for Shigao station, marking the start of the station's construction.
- November 18: Line S5's Min River Mega Bridge started construction.

=== 2023 ===
- July 7: Station names were posted for the Chengdu section, and the public was invited to give suggestions.
- August 15: Station names for the Chengdu section were officially announced.

== Train ==
Line S5 will use 4-car Type-A trains, with a standard capacity of 756 passengers. The power system uses 1,500 V DC via overhead lines. The trains operate at 160 km/h max. There are 23 trains and 92 cars.

== Stations ==
Line S5 Station Details
Express Services	Chinese	English	Opening	Distance (km)	Total Distance (km)	Types		Transfer	Location
Express Services	Chinese	English	Opening	Distance (km)	Total Distance (km)	Station	Platform	Transfer	Location
●	红莲	Honglian	2027	-	0	Underground	Side platform	19	Shuangliu, Chengdu
●	秦皇寺	Qinhuangsi	2027	0.924	0.924	Underground	Side platform	6	Shuangliu, Chengdu
｜	官塘	Guantang	2027			Underground	Side platform		Shuangliu, Chengdu
｜	煎茶	Jiancha	2027			Elevated	Double island		Shuangliu, Chengdu
●	红碑	Hongbei	2027			Elevated	Side platform		Shuangliu, Chengdu
｜	天府视高	Tianfushigao	2027	8.917		Elevated	Side platform		Renshou, Meishan
｜	南天府公园	Nantianfu Park	2027			Elevated	Double island		Renshou, Meishan
｜	南桥乐高	Nanqiao Lego	2027			Elevated	Side platform		Renshou, Meishan
｜	黑龙滩	Heilongtan	2027			Elevated	Double island		Renshou, Meishan
｜	川大眉山校区	Sichuan University Meishan Campus	2027			Elevated	Side platform		Dongpo, Meishan
●	省儿童医院	Sichuan Provincial Children's Hospital	2027			Elevated	Side platform		Dongpo, Meishan
●	东坡	Dongpo	2027			Underground	Island		Dongpo, Meishan
●	眉山东站	Meishan East Railway Station	2027			Underground	Island	Chengdu-Guizhou Passenger Dedicated Line	Dongpo, Meishan
