= Xinglong =

Xinglong may refer to the following locations in China:

- Xinglong County (兴隆县), Chengde, Hebei
- Xinglong Station (NAOC) (兴隆观测基地), an observatory situated in Xinglong County, Chengde, Hebei

== Townships (兴隆乡) ==
- Xinglong Township, Anhui, in Jingde County
- Xinglong Township, Baiyin, in Jingyuan County, Gansu
- Xinglong Township, Xihe County, Gansu
- Xinglong Township, Dafang County, Guizhou
- Xinglong Township, Fuquan, Guizhou
- Xinglong Township, Tongren, in Sinan County, Guizhou
- Xinglong Township, Harbin, in Wuchang City
- Xinglong Township, Wudalianchi, Heilongjiang
- Xinglong Township, Gannan County, Heilongjiang
- Xinglong Township, Henan, in Kaifeng County
- Xinglong Township, Jiangsu, in Xuyi County
- Xinglong Township, Jilin, in Fusong County
- Xinglong Township, Ningxia, in Tongxin County
- Xinglong Township, Shandong, in Jinxiang County
- Xinglong Township, Tongjiang County, Sichuan
- Xinglong Township, Xuyong County, Sichuan
- Xinglong Township, Yunnan, in Yanjin County

== Subdistricts ==
- Xinglong Subdistrict, Wuzhou (兴龙街道), in Changzhou District, Wuzhou, Guangxi

Written as "兴隆街道":

- Xinglong Subdistrict, Mudanjiang, in Dong'an District, Mudanjiang, Heilongjiang
- Xinglong, Shaoyang, in Shuangqing District, Shaoyang, Hunan
- Xinglong, Longshan (兴隆街道), a subdistrict in Longshan County, Hunan.
- Xinglong Subdistrict, Jungar Banner, Inner Mongolia
- Xinglong Subdistrict, Nanjing, in Jianye District, Nanjing, Jiangsu
- Xinglong Subdistrict, Linjiang, Jilin
- Xinglong Subdistrict, Taonan, Jilin
- Xinglong Subdistrict, Fuxin, in Xinqiu District, Fuxin, Liaoning
- Xinglong Subdistrict, Jinzhou, in Taihe District, Jinzhou, Liaoning
- Xinglong Subdistrict, Panjin, in Xinglongtai District, Panjin, Liaoning
- Xinglong Subdistrict, Xi'an, in Chang'an District, Xi'an, Shaanxi
- Xinglong Subdistrict, Jinan, in Shizhong District, Jinan, Shandong
- Xinglong Subdistrict, Kenli County, Shandong
- Xinglong Subdistrict, Duodao, in Duodao District, Jingmen, Hubei

== See also ==
- Xinglong Station (disambiguation)
- Xinglong Town (disambiguation) (兴隆镇)
