= Xinglong Station =

Xinglong Station may refer to:

- Xinglong station (Chengdu Metro), a station on Line 18 of the Chengdu Metro in Chengdu, Sichuan Province, China
- Xinglong Lake station, a station on Line 1 of Chengdu Metro in Chengdu, Sichuan Province, China
- Xinglong Station (NAOC), an observatory in Xinglong County, Hebei Province, China

== See also ==
- Xinglongxian West railway station (Xinglong County West railway station), high-speed rail station in Xinglong County, Hebei Province, China
