= Luhu Lake station =

Metro station in Chengdu, China

Luhu Lake 麓湖
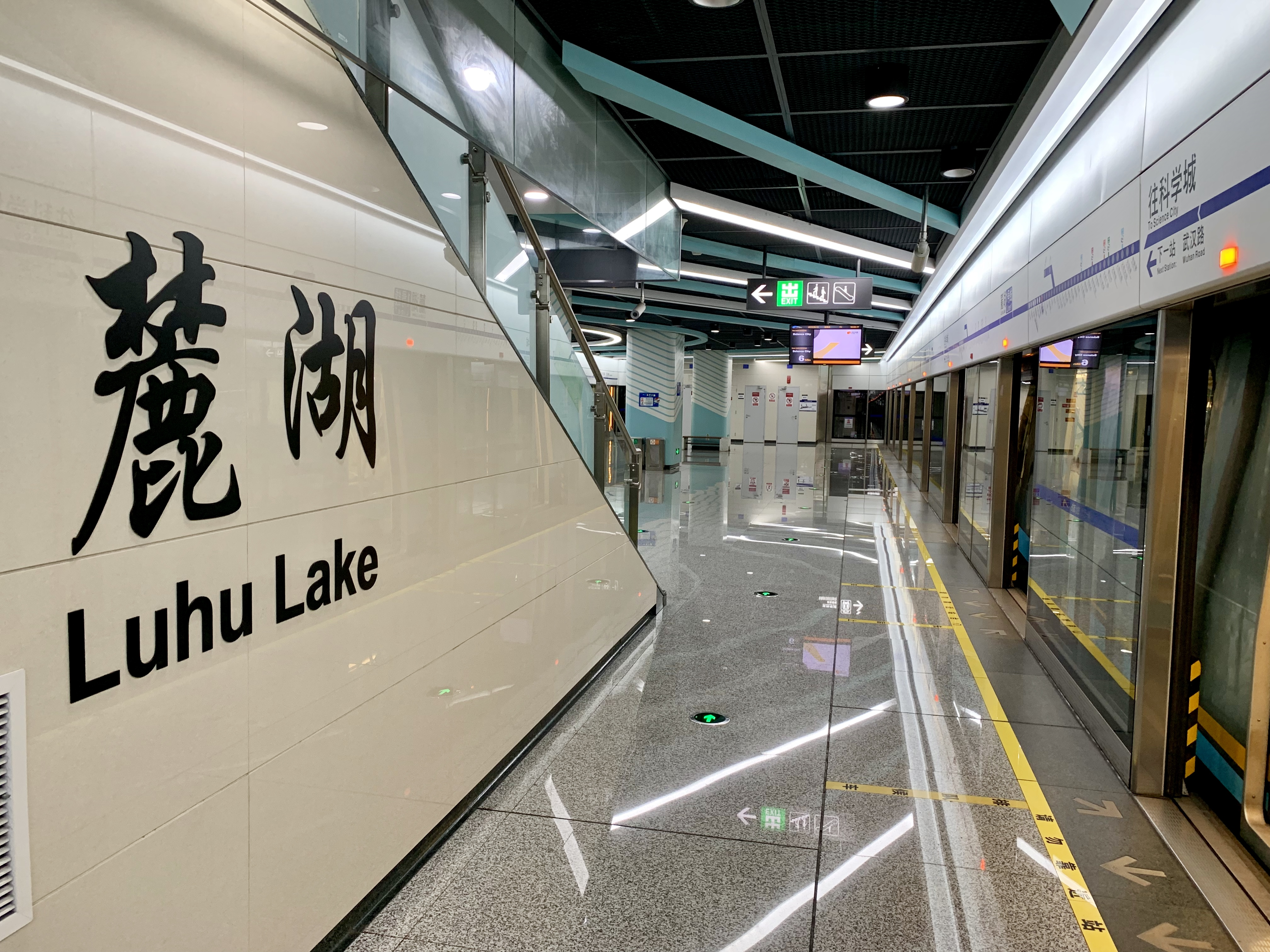

General information
- Location: Shuangliu District, Chengdu, Sichuan; China
- Coordinates: 30.4702°N 104.0699°E
- Operated by: Chengdu Metro Limited
- Line: Line 1
- Platforms: 2 (1 island platform)

Other information
- Station code: 0127

History
- Opened: 18 March 2018

Services
Preceding station	Chengdu Metro	Following station
Hongshi Park towards Weijianian	Line 1	Wuhan Road towards Science City
Location

Luhu Lake (Chinese: 麓湖) is a station on Line 1 of the Chengdu Metro in China.

== Station layout ==
G	Entrances and Exits	Exits A-D
B1	Concourse	Faregates, Station Agent
B2	Northbound	← Line 1 towards Weijianian (Hongshi Park)
B2	Island platform, doors open on the left
B2	Southbound	Line 1 towards Science City (Wuhan Road) →

== Gallery ==
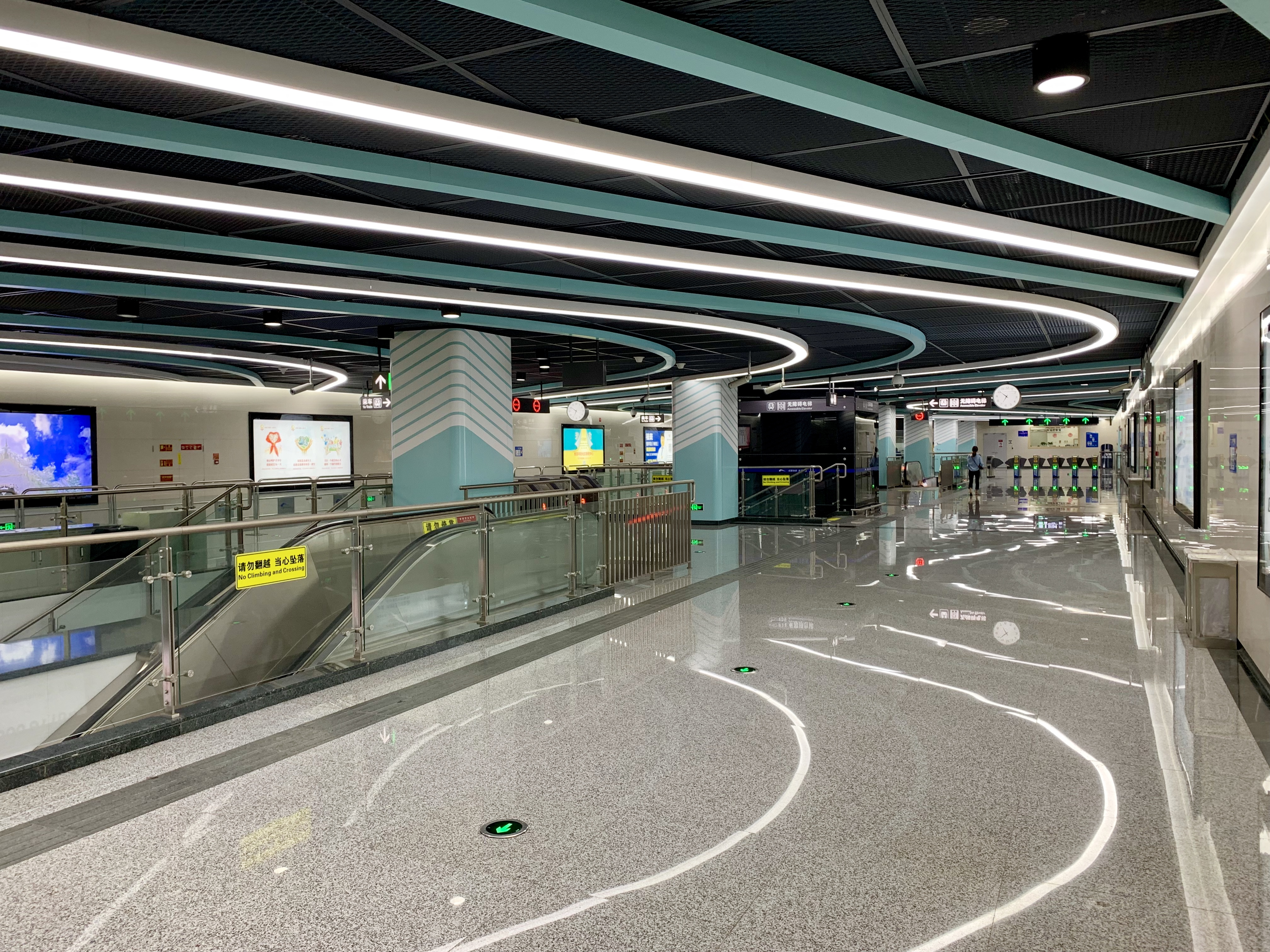
Concourse

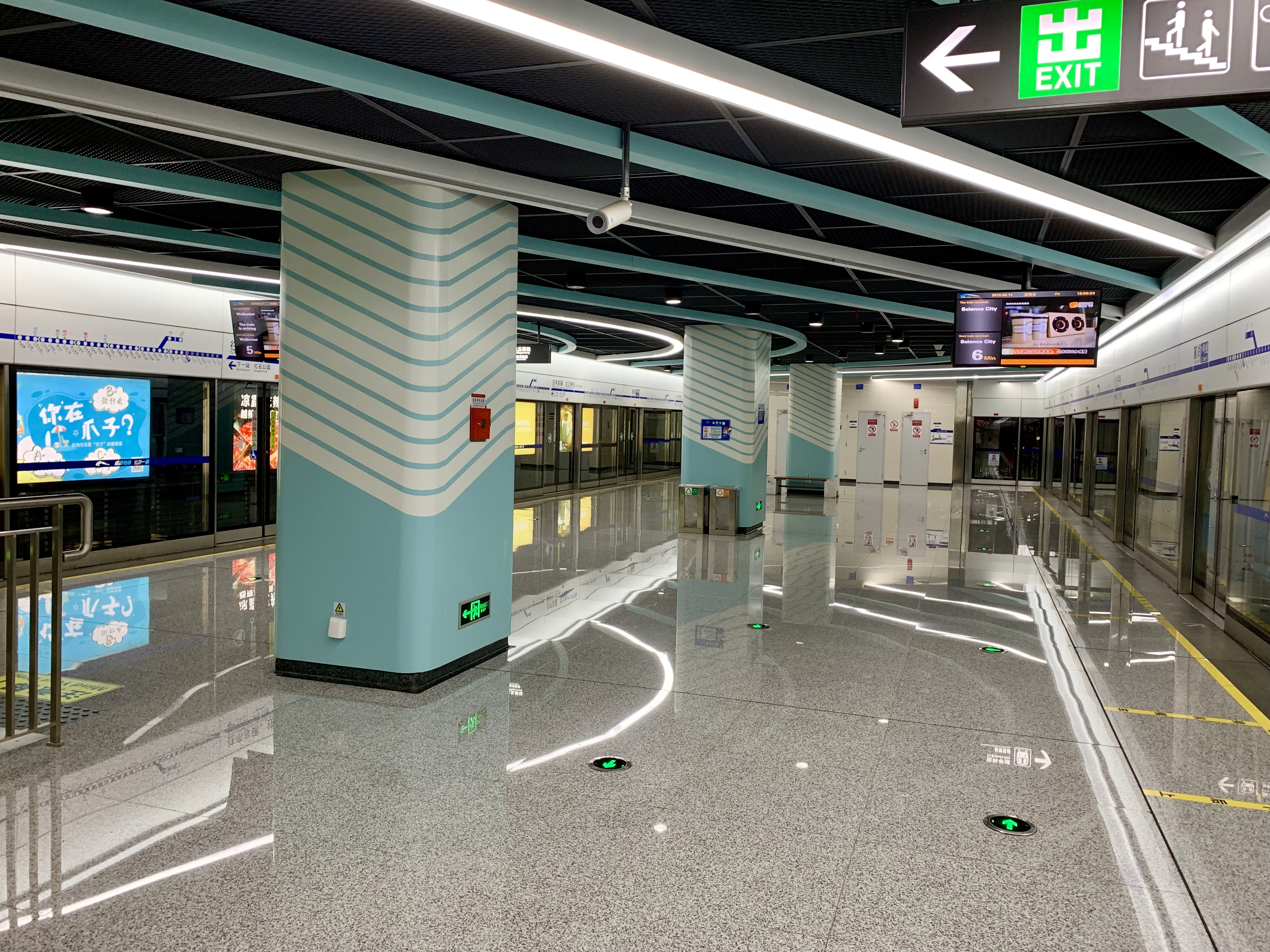
Platform
