= Guangzhou Road station =

Metro station in Chengdu, China

Guangzhou Road 广州路
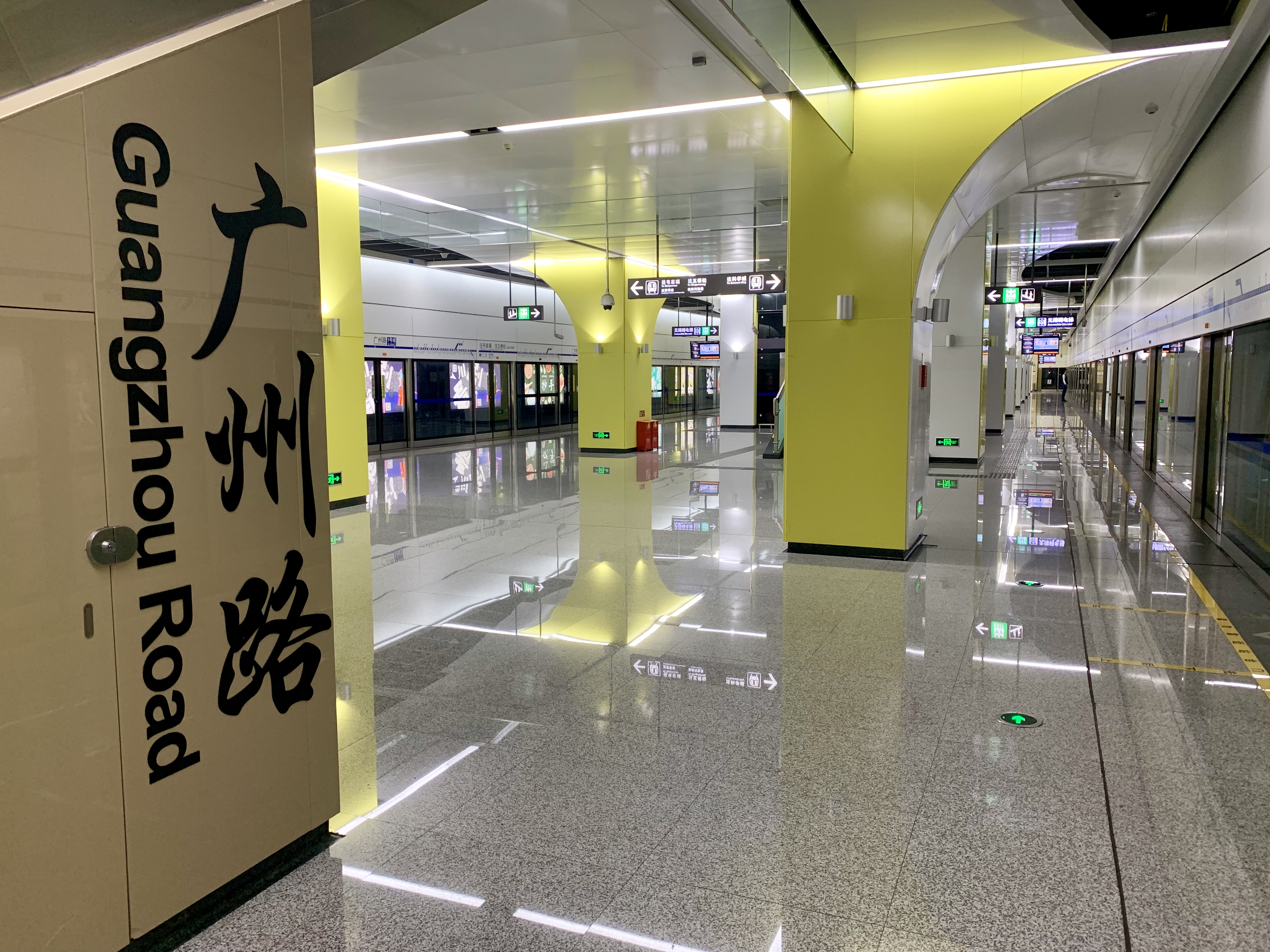

General information
- Location: Shuangliu District, Chengdu, Sichuan; China
- Coordinates: 30.4204°N 104.0749°E
- Operated by: Chengdu Metro Limited
- Line(s): Line 1
- Platforms: 2 (1 island platform)

Other information
- Station code: 0131

History
- Opened: 18 March 2018

Services
Preceding station	Chengdu Metro	Following station
Western China Int'l Expo City towards Weijianian	Line 1	Xinglong Lake towards Science City

Guangzhou Road (Chinese: 广州路) is a station on Line 1 of the Chengdu Metro in China.

== Station layout ==
G	Entrances and Exits	Exits B-F
B1	Concourse	Faregates, Station Agent
B2	Northbound	← Line 1 towards Weijianian (Western China Int'l Expo City)
B2	Island platform, doors open on the left
B2	Southbound	Line 1 towards Science City (Xinglong Lake) →

== Gallery ==
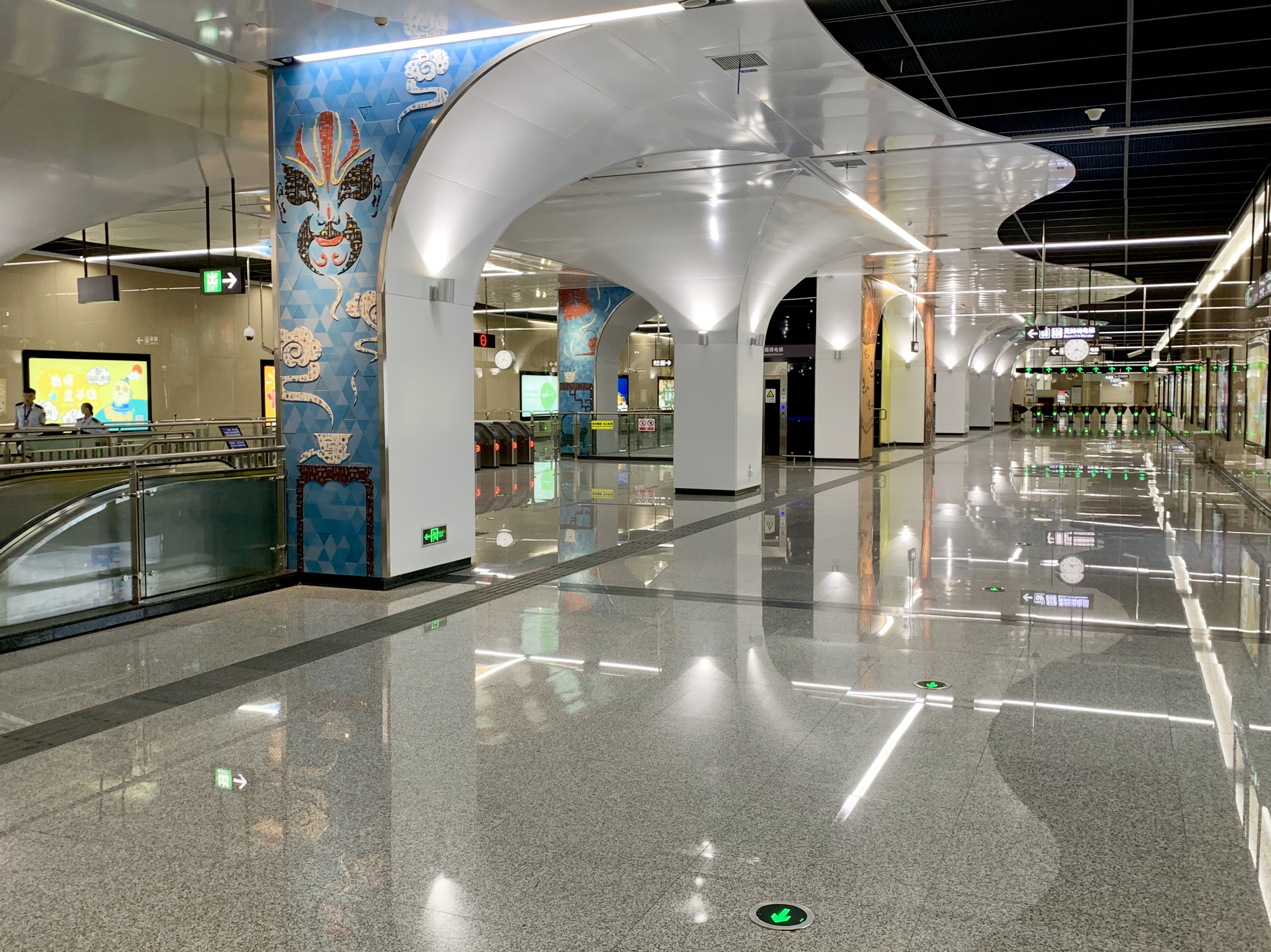
Concourse

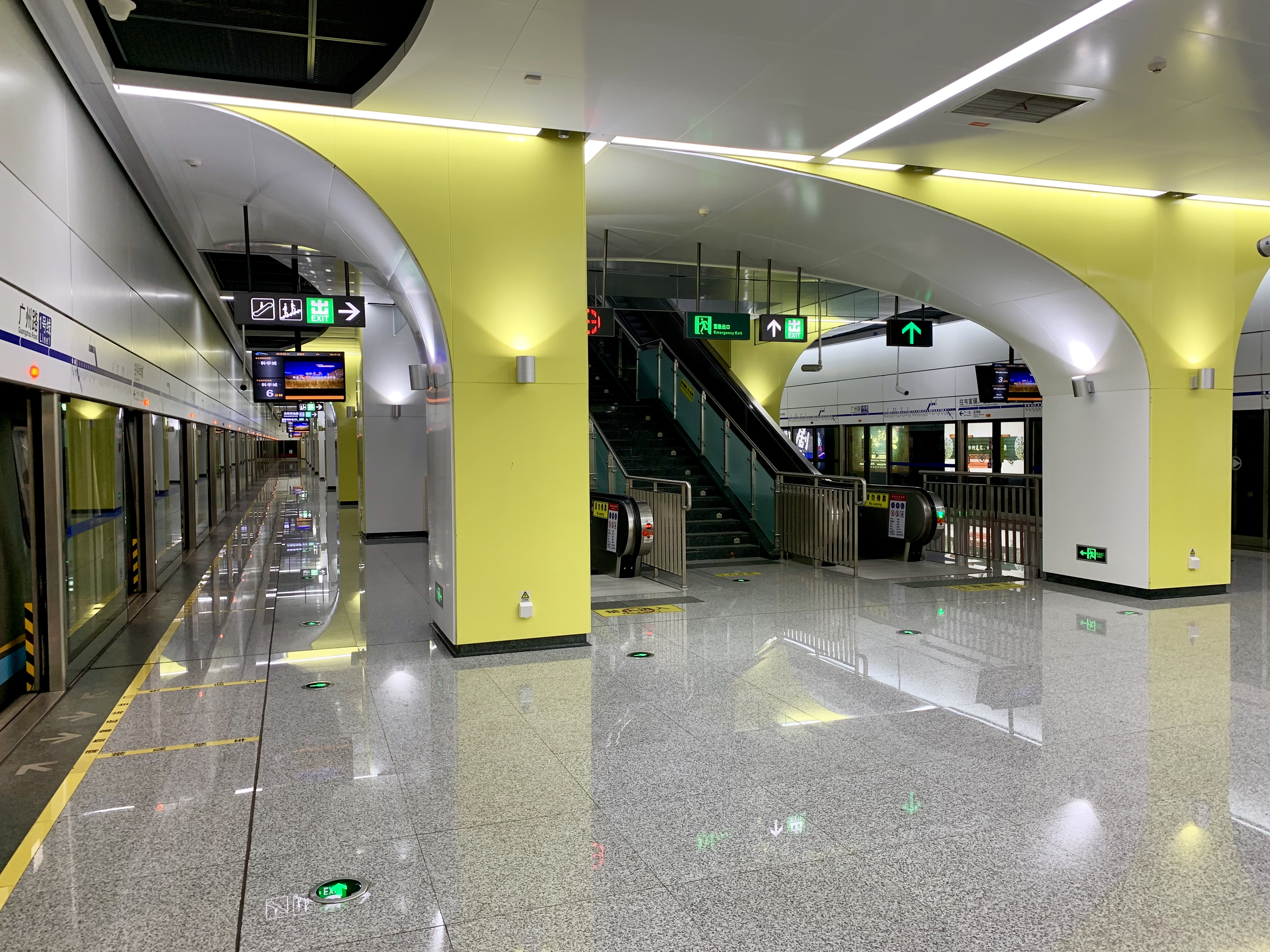
Platform
