= Wuhan Road station =

Wuhan Road station may refer to the following stations:

- Wuhan Road station (Chengdu Metro), on Line 1 of the Chengdu Metro
- Wuhan Road station (Luoyang Subway) on Line 1 of the Luoyang Subway
