= Western China International Expo City station =

Metro station in Chengdu, China

Western China Int'l Expo City 西博城
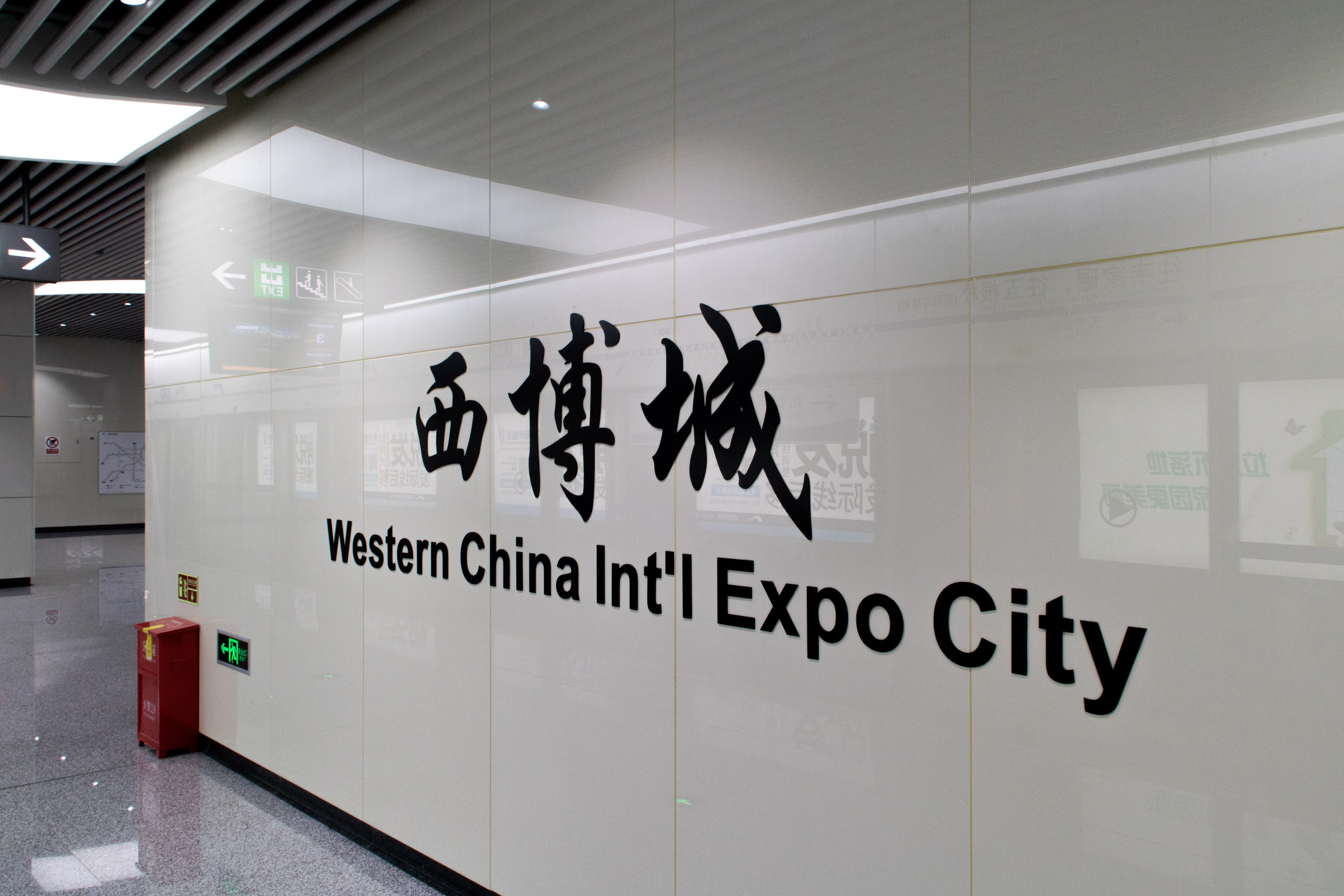

General information
- Location: Shuangliu District, Chengdu, Sichuan; China
- Coordinates: 30.4272°N 104.0732°E
- Operated by: Chengdu Metro Limited
- Lines: Line 1 Line 6 Line 18
- Platforms: 6 (3 island platforms)

Other information
- Station code: 0130 0650 1810

History
- Opened: 18 March 2018 (Line 1); 18 December 2020 (Line 6); 27 September 2020 (Line 18)

Services
Preceding station	Chengdu Metro	Following station
Tianfu Park towards Weijianian	Line 1	Guangzhou Road towards Science City
Tianfu Commercial District towards Wangcong Temple	Line 6	Qinhuangsi towards Lanjiagou
Haichang Road towards South Railway Station	Line 18	Xinglong towards Tianfu International Airport North
Location

Western China International Expo City (Chinese: 西博城) is a station on Line 1, Line 6 and Line 18 of the Chengdu Metro in China.

== Station layout ==
G	Entrances and Exits	Exits C-E
B1	Concourse	Faregates, Station Agent
B2	Northbound	← Line 1 towards Weijianian (Tianfu Park)
B2	Island platform, doors open on the left
B2	Southbound	Line 1 towards Science City (Guangzhou Road) →
B2	Northbound	← Line 18 towards South Railway Station (Haichang Road)
B2	Island platform, doors open on the left
B2	Southbound	Line 18 towards Sancha (Xinglong) →
B3	Transfer Hall
B4	Northbound	← Line 6 towards Wangcong Temple (Tianfu Commercial District)
B4	Island platform, doors open on the left
B4	Southbound	Line 6 to Lanjiagou (Qinhuangsi) →

== Gallery ==
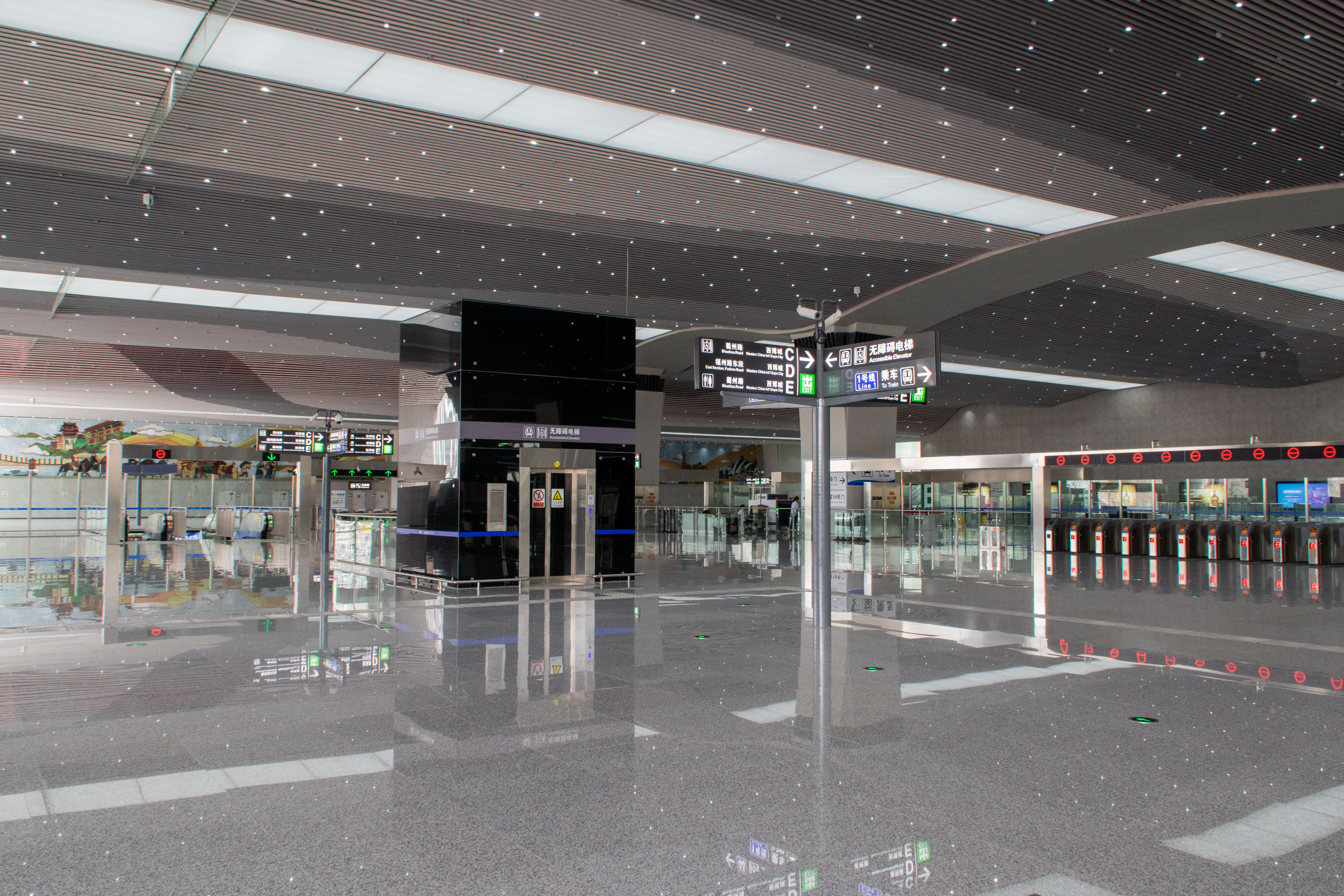
Concourse

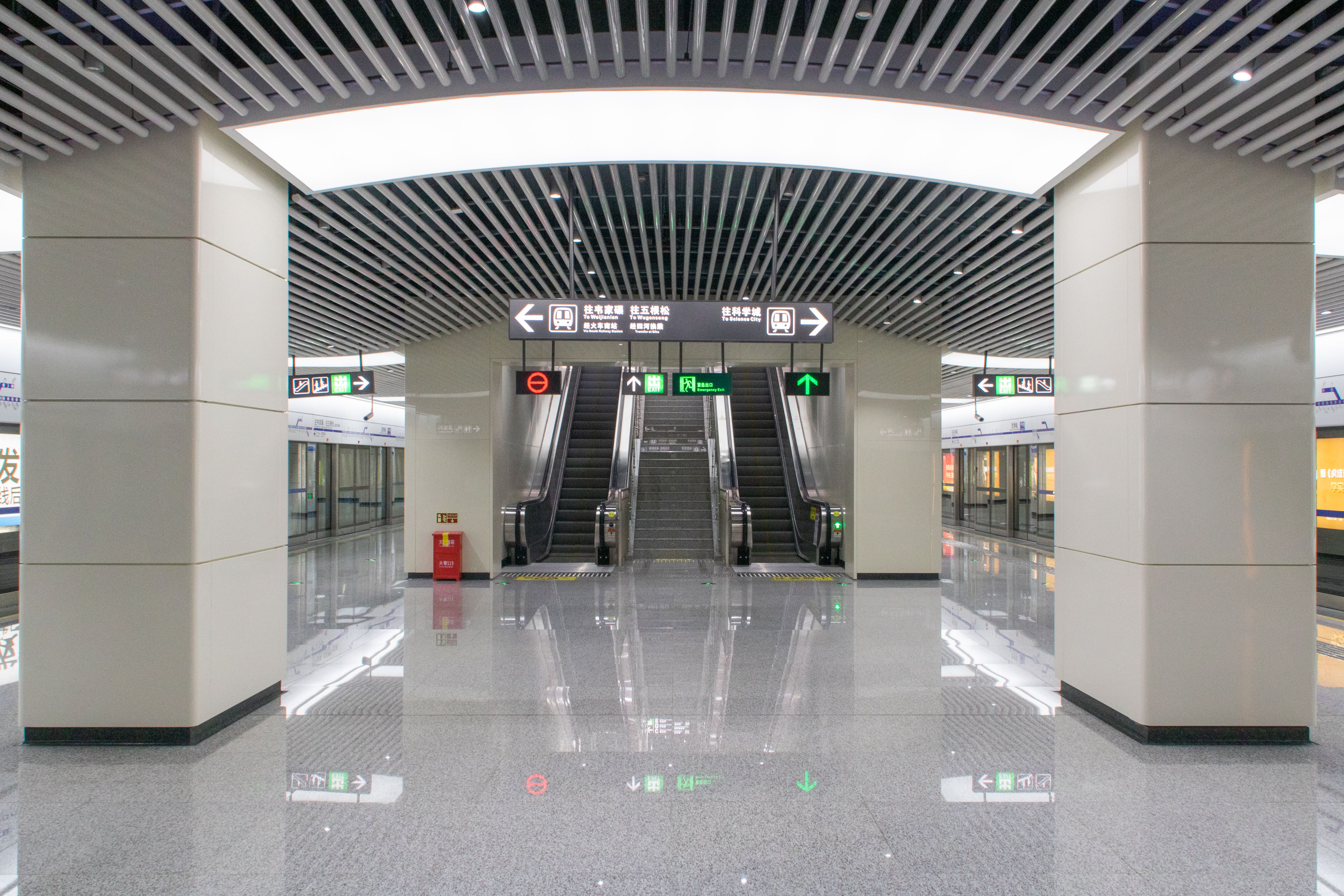
Line 1 platform

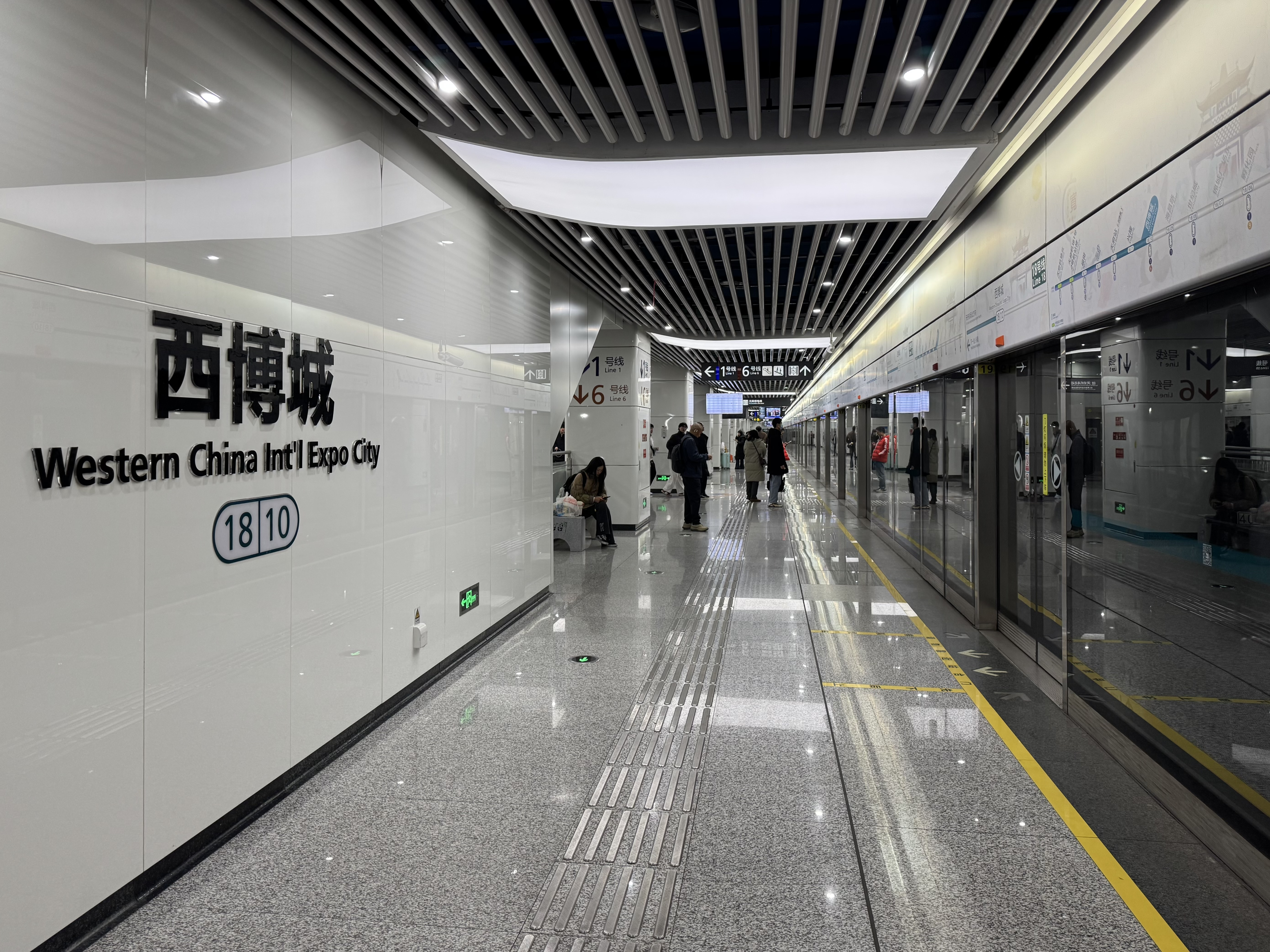
Line 18 platform
