= Guangfu station =

Metro station in Chengdu, China

Guangfu 广福
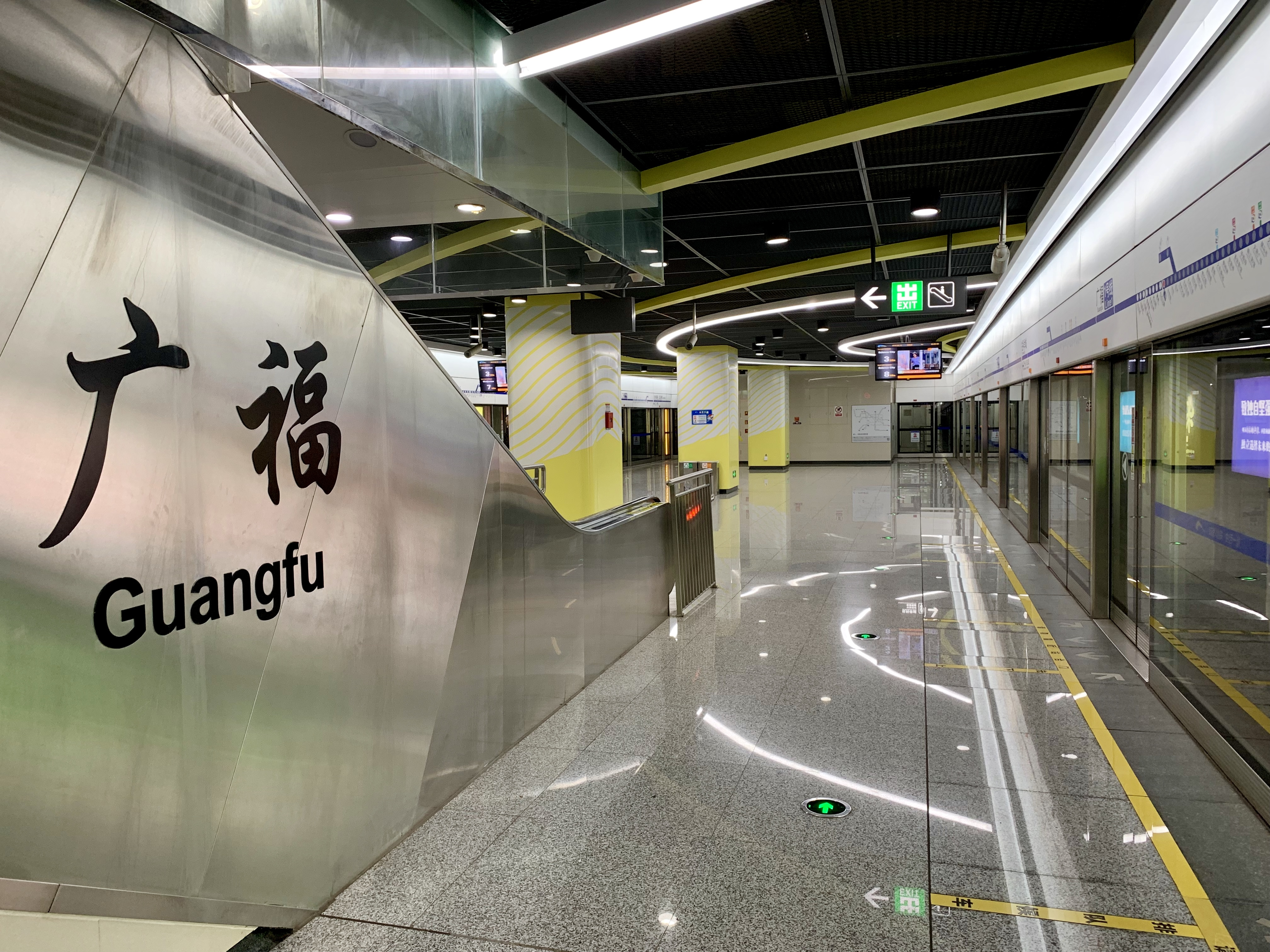

General information
- Location: Shuangliu District, Chengdu, Sichuan; China
- Coordinates: 30.4797°N 104.0676°E
- Operated by: Chengdu Metro Limited
- Line(s): Line 1
- Platforms: 2 (1 island platform)

Other information
- Station code: 0125

History
- Opened: 18 March 2018

Services
Preceding station	Chengdu Metro	Following station
Haichang Road towards Weijianian	Line 1	Hongshi Park towards Science City

Guangfu (Chinese: 广福) is a station on Line 1 of the Chengdu Metro in China.

== Station layout ==
G	Entrances and Exits	Exit A-C
B1	Concourse	Faregates, Station Agent
B2	Northbound	← Line 1 towards Weijianian (Haichang Road)
B2	Island platform, doors open on the left
B2	Southbound	Line 1 towards Science City (Hongshi Park) →

== Gallery ==
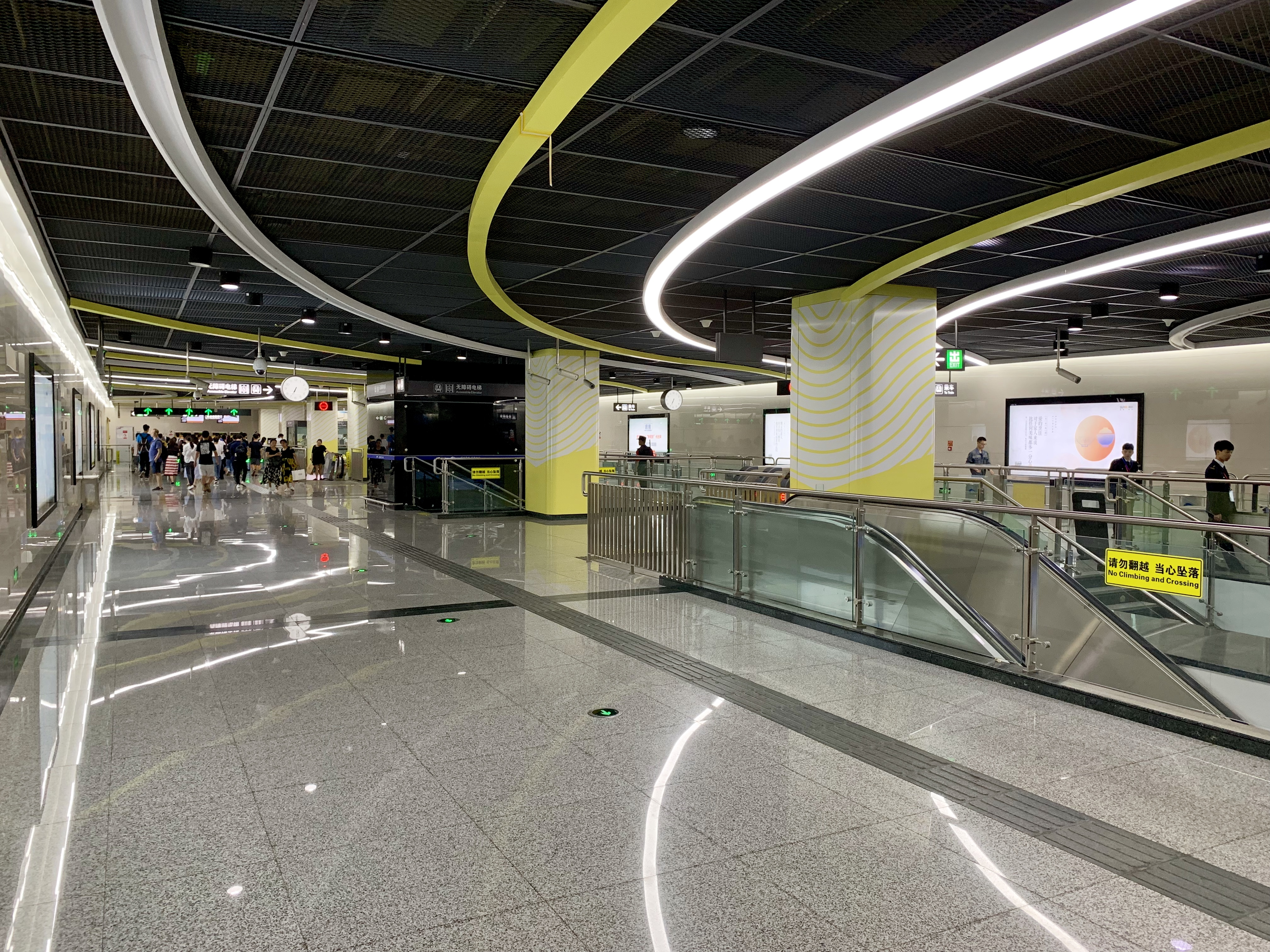
Concourse

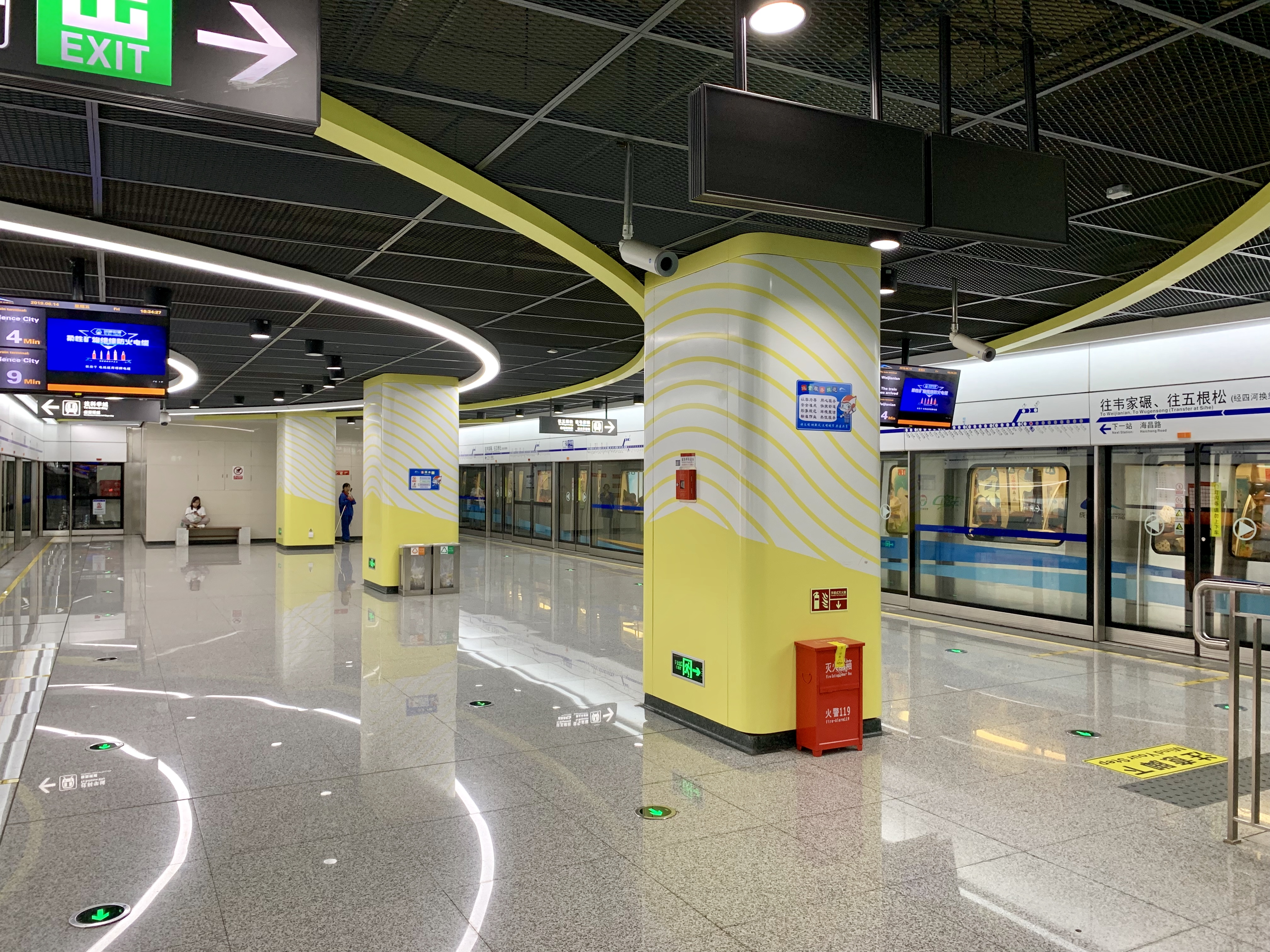
Platform
