= Hongshi Park station =

Metro station in Chengdu, China

Hongshi Park 红石公园
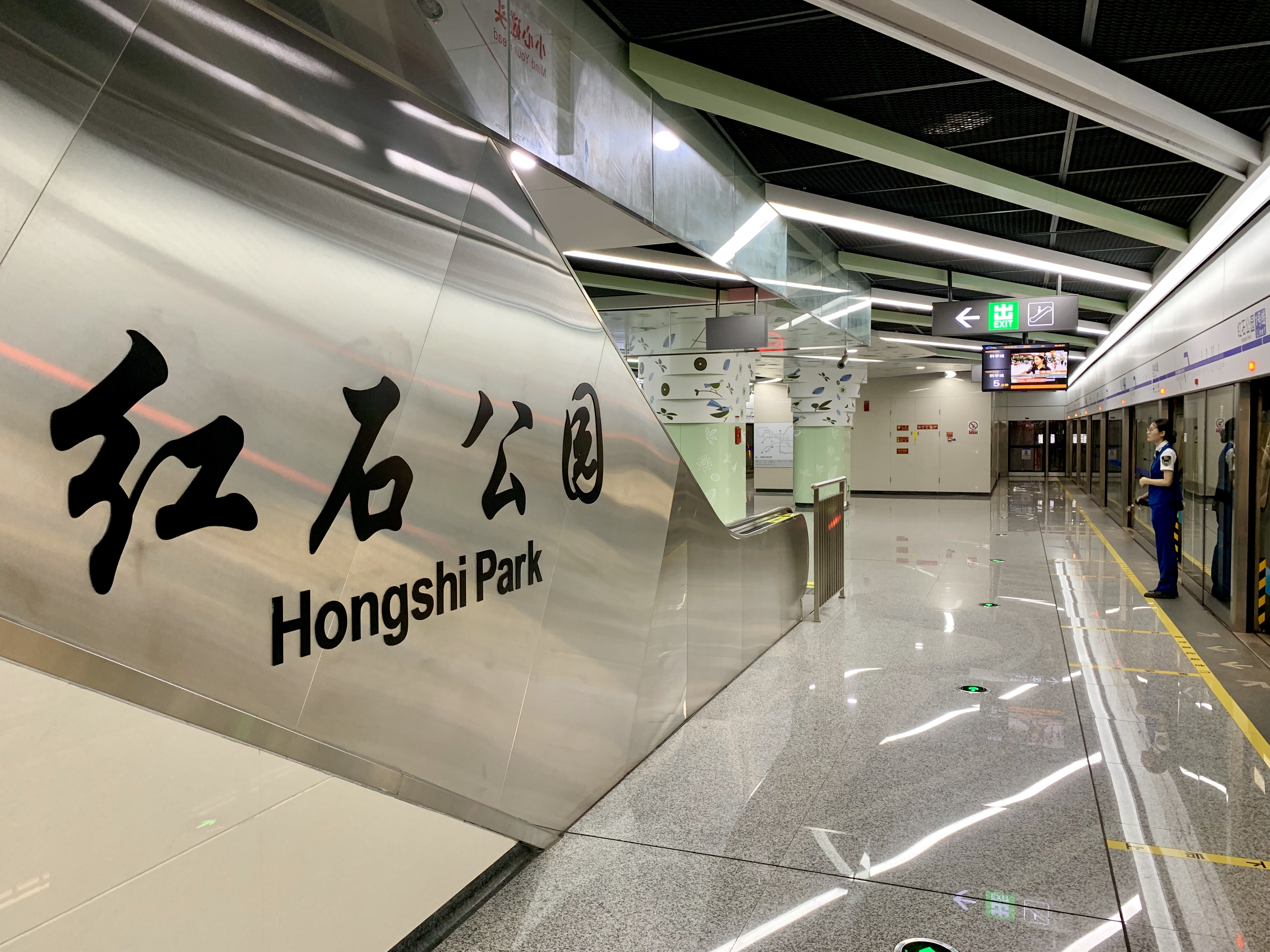

General information
- Location: Shuangliu District, Chengdu, Sichuan; China
- Coordinates: 30.4790°N 104.0707°E
- Operated by: Chengdu Metro Limited
- Line(s): Line 1
- Platforms: 2 (1 island platform)

Other information
- Station code: 0126

History
- Opened: 18 March 2018

Services
| Preceding station | Chengdu Metro | Following station |
|---|---|---|
| Guangfu towards Weijianian | Line 1 | Luhu Lake towards Science City |

Hongshi Park (Chinese: 红石公园) is a station on Line 1 of the Chengdu Metro in China.

== Station layout ==
| G | Entrances and Exits | Exits A-D |
| B1 | Concourse | Faregates, Station Agent |
| B2 | Northbound | ← Line 1 towards Weijianian (Guangfu) |
| B2 | Island platform, doors open on the left |
| B2 | Southbound | Line 1 towards Science City (Luhu Lake) → |

== Gallery ==
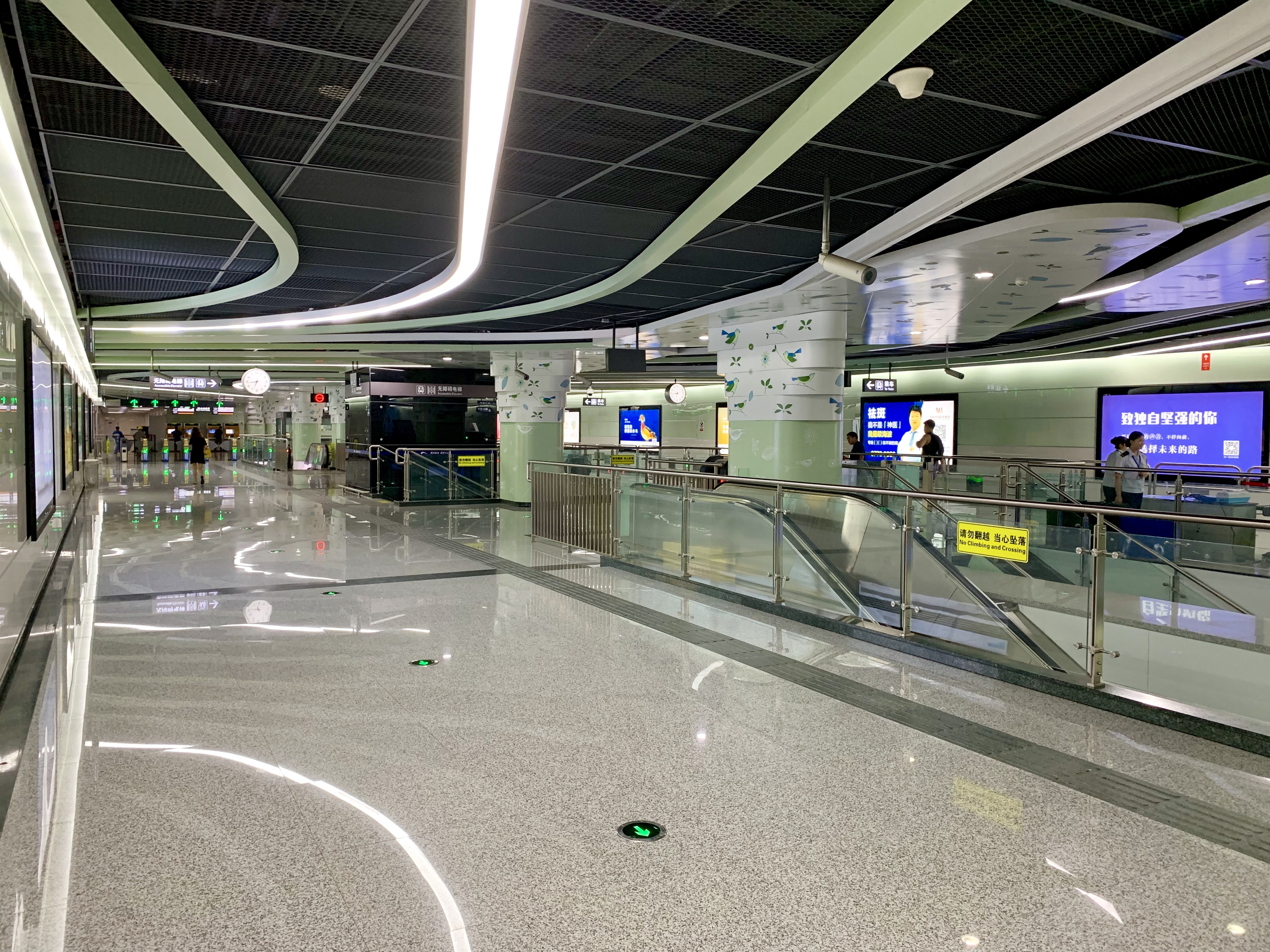
Concourse

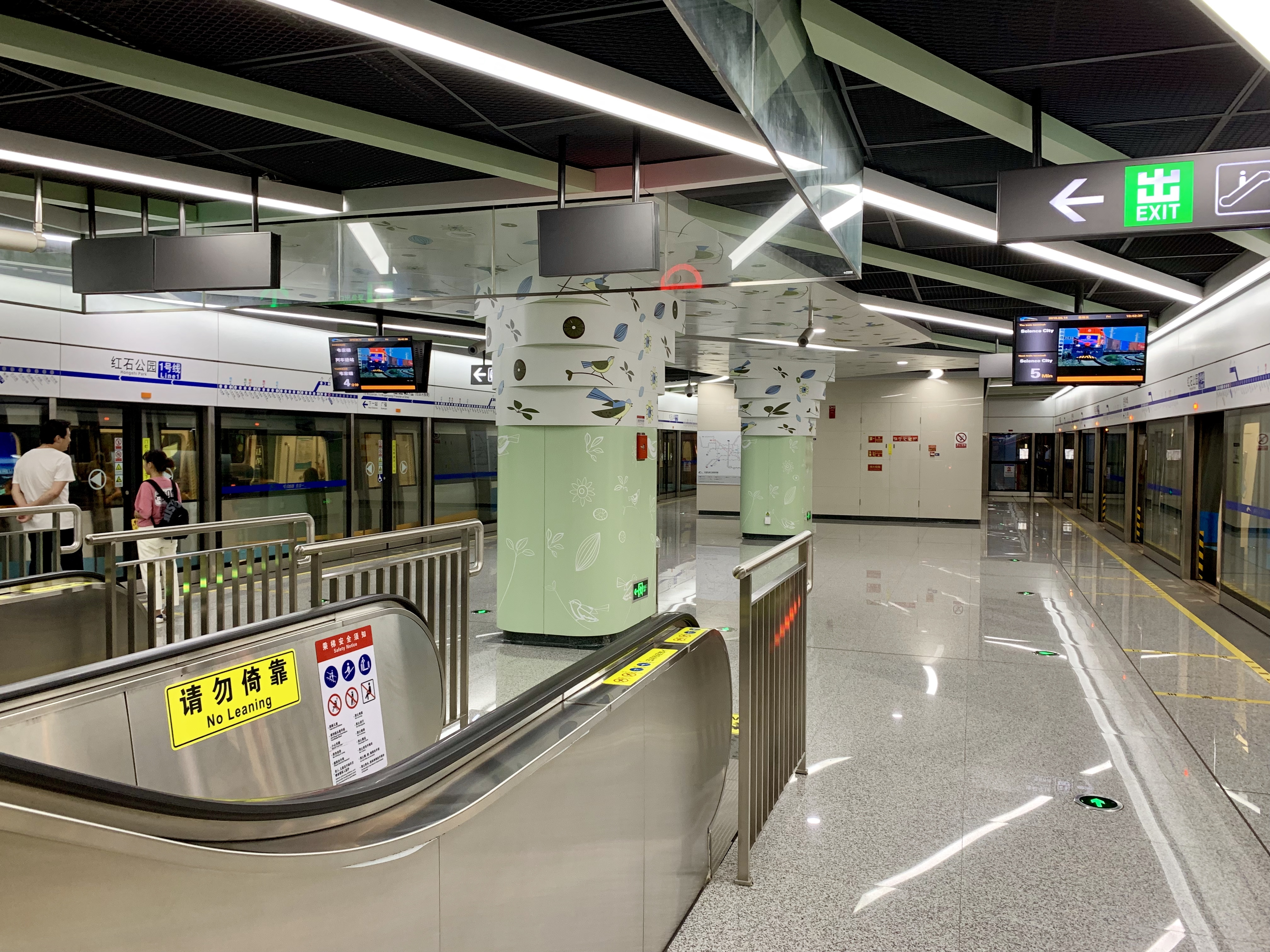
Platform
