= Xinglong Lake station =

Metro station in Chengdu, China

Xinglong Lake 兴隆湖
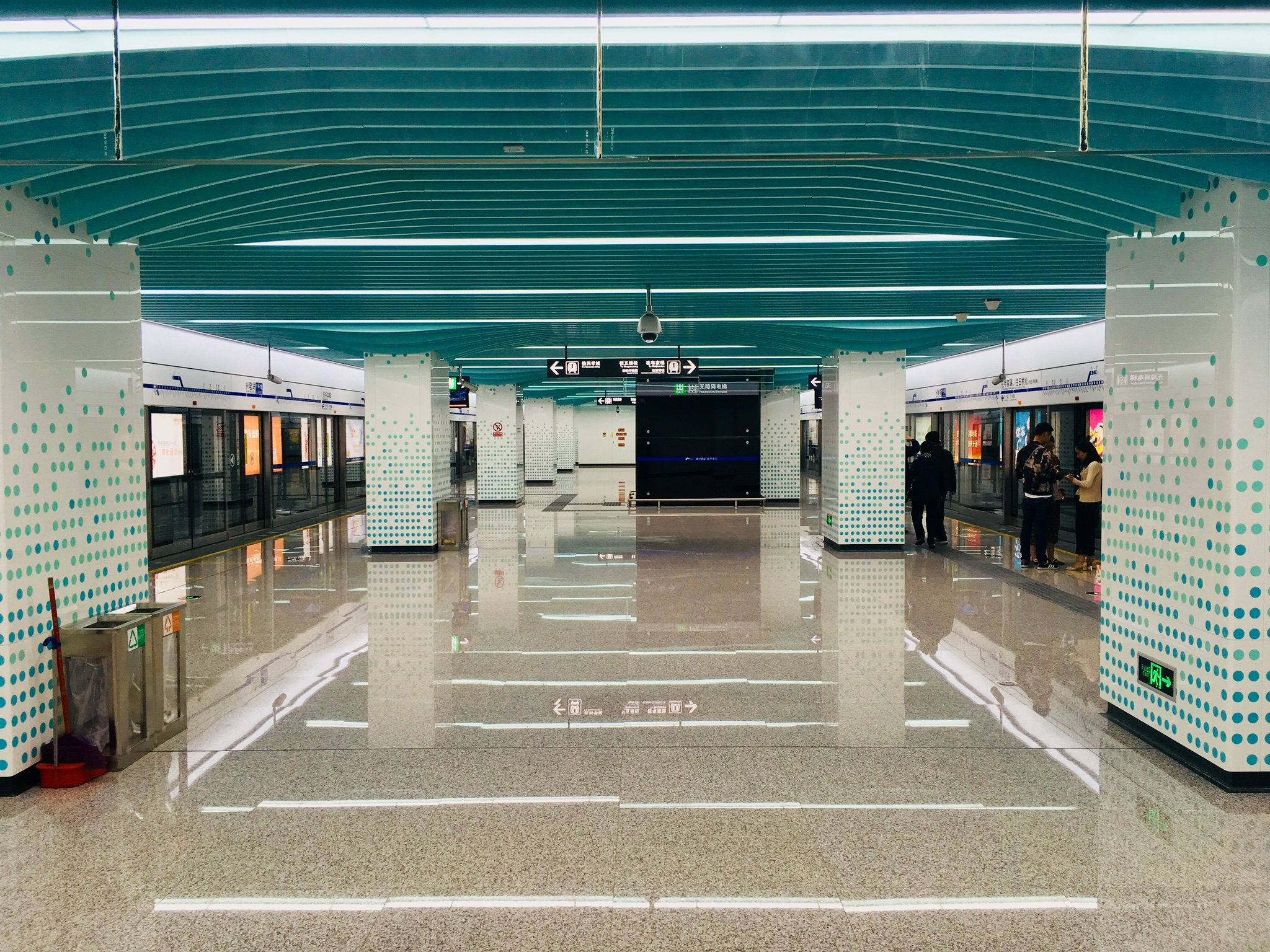

General information
- Location: Shuangliu District / Tianfu New Area, Chengdu, Sichuan; China
- Coordinates: 30.4043°N 104.0718°E
- Operated by: Chengdu Metro Limited
- Line(s): Line 1
- Platforms: 2 (1 island platform)

Other information
- Station code: 0132

History
- Opened: 18 March 2018

Services
Preceding station	Chengdu Metro	Following station
Guangzhou Road towards Weijianian	Line 1	Science City Terminus

Xinglong Lake (Chinese: 兴隆湖) is a station on Line 1 of the Chengdu Metro in China.

== Station layout ==
G	Entrances and Exits	Exits A-D
B1	Concourse	Faregates, Station Agent
B2	Northbound	← Line 1 towards Weijianian (Guangzhou Road)
B2	Island platform, doors open on the left
B2	Southbound	Line 1 towards Science City (Terminus) →

== Gallery ==
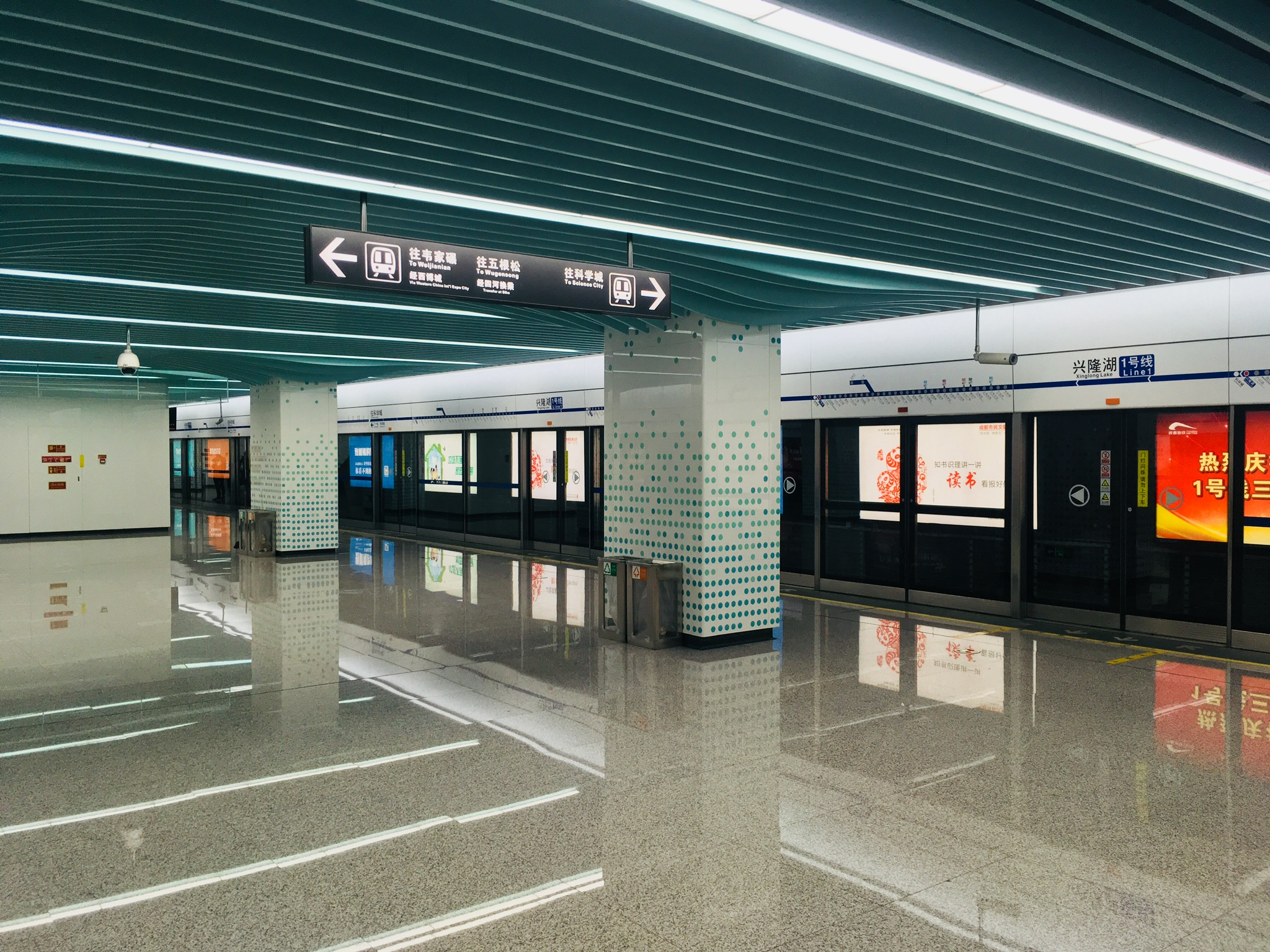
Platform
