= Qinhuangsi station =

Metro station in Chengdu, China

Qinhuangsi 秦皇寺
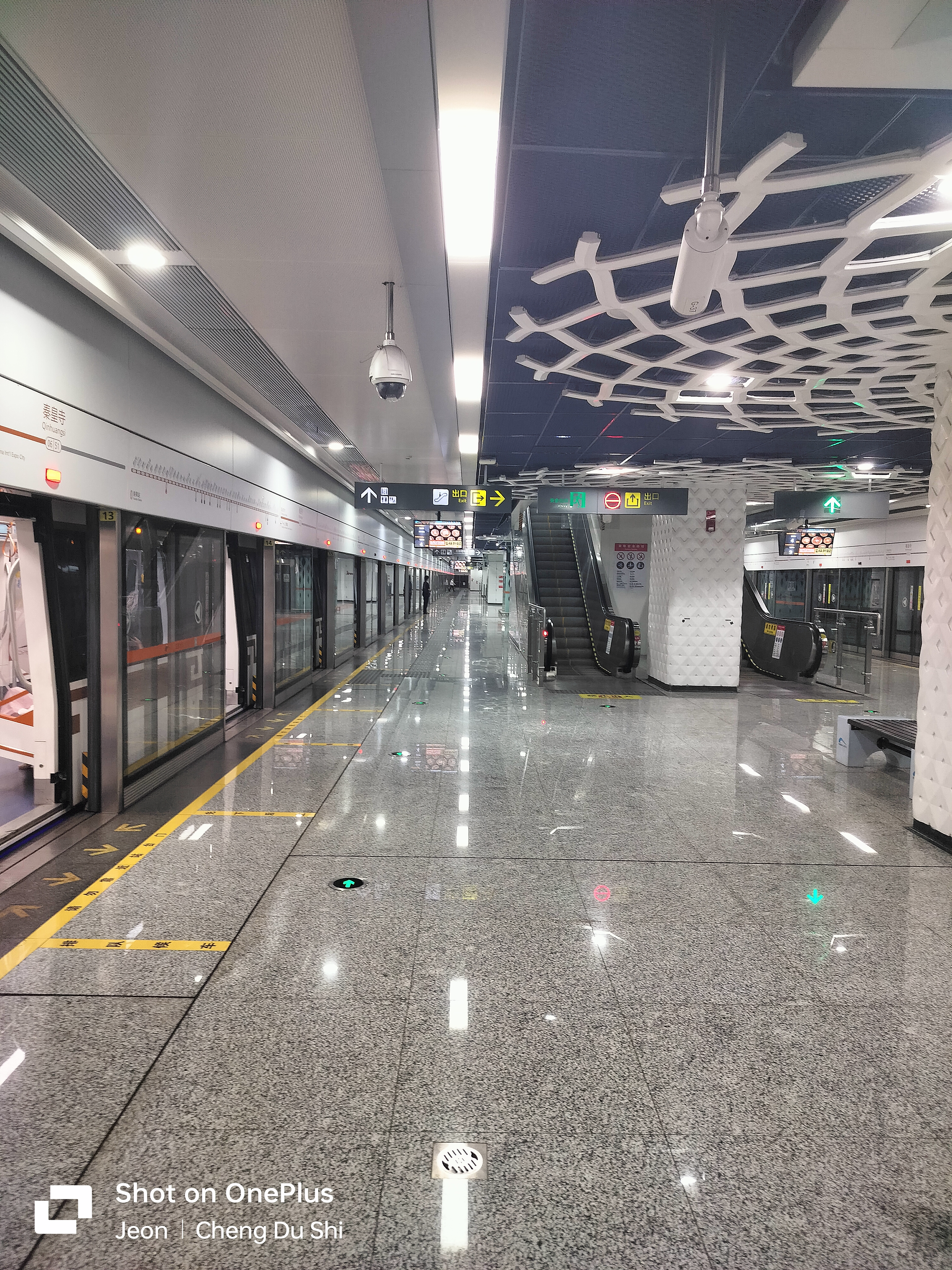

General information
- Location: Shuangliu District, Chengdu, Sichuan; China
- Coordinates: 30.4269°N 104.0594°E
- Operated by: Chengdu Metro Limited
- Line: Line 6
- Platforms: 2 (1 island platform)

Other information
- Station code: 0651

History
- Opened: 18 December 2020

Services
Preceding station	Chengdu Metro	Following station
Western China Int'l Expo City towards Wangcong Temple	Line 6	Songlin towards Lanjiagou
Location

Qinhuangsi Station is a metro station at Chengdu, Sichuan, China. It opened on December 18, 2020 with the opening of Chengdu Metro Line 6.
