= Xinglong station (Chengdu Metro) =

Metro station in Chengdu, China

Xinglong 兴隆
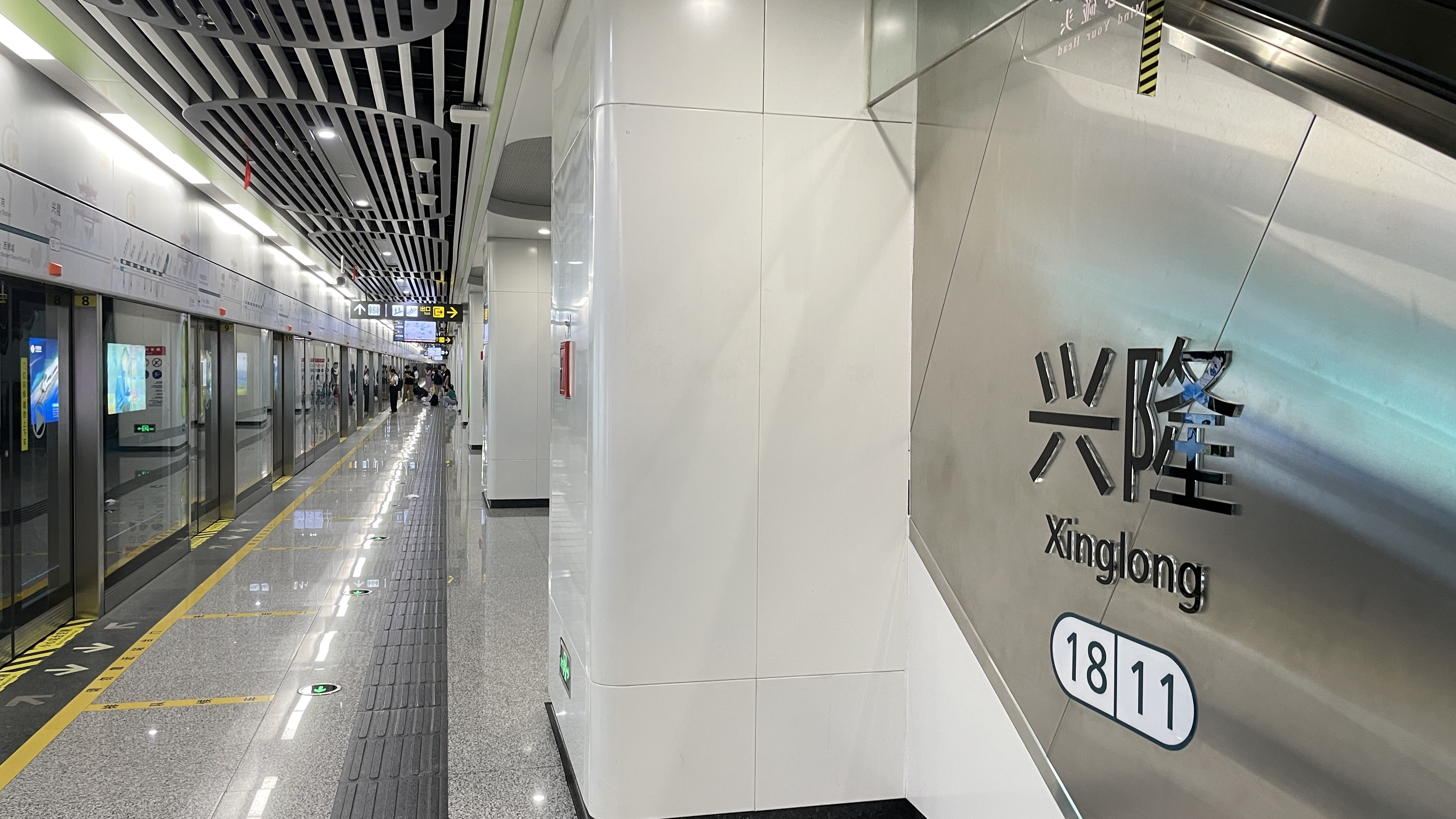

General information
- Location: Tianfu New Area, Chengdu, Sichuan; China
- Coordinates: 30.41201°N 104.09915°E
- Operated by: Chengdu Metro Limited
- Line(s): Line 18
- Platforms: 2 (1 island platform)

Other information
- Station code: 1811

History
- Opened: 27 September 2020

Services
Preceding station	Chengdu Metro	Following station
Western China Int'l Expo City towards South Railway Station	Line 18	Sancha towards Tianfu International Airport North

Xinglong (Chinese: 兴隆) is a station on Line 18 of the Chengdu Metro in China.
