= Xinglong Town =

Xinglong Town (兴隆镇) could refer to a number of towns in China:

== Chongqing ==
- Xinglong, Nanchuan District, Chongqing
- Xinglong, Yubei District, Chongqing
- Xinglong, Fengjie County
- Xinglong, Youyang County

== Guizhou ==
- Xinglong, Anlong County
- Xinglong, Meitan County

== Hebei ==
- Xinglong Town, Hebei

== Heilongjiang ==
- Xinglong, Bayan County
- Xinglong, Youyi County

== Henan ==
- Xinglong, Sheqi County

== Hubei ==
- Xinglong, Hubei, in Zaoyang

== Hunan ==
- Xinglong, Xinhuang County, in Xinhuang Dong Autonomous County

== Jilin ==
- Xinglong, Jiutai
- Xinglong, Shuangliao

== Liaoning ==
- Xinglong, Liaoyang County
- Xinglong, Xinmin

== Ningxia ==
- Xinglong, Xiji County

== Shaanxi ==
- Xinglong, Jingyang County
- Xinglong, Pingli County
- Xinglong, Zhenba County

== Shandong ==
- Xinglong, Linyi County

== Sichuan ==
- Xinglong, Zigong, in Yantan District
- Xinglong, Guanghan
- Xinglong, Mianzhu
- Xinglong, Anyue County
- Xinglong, Luding County
- Xinglong, Shuangliu County
- Xinglong, Yuechi County
- Xinglong, Zhongjiang County
