= Sancha station =

Metro station in Chengdu, China

Sancha 三岔
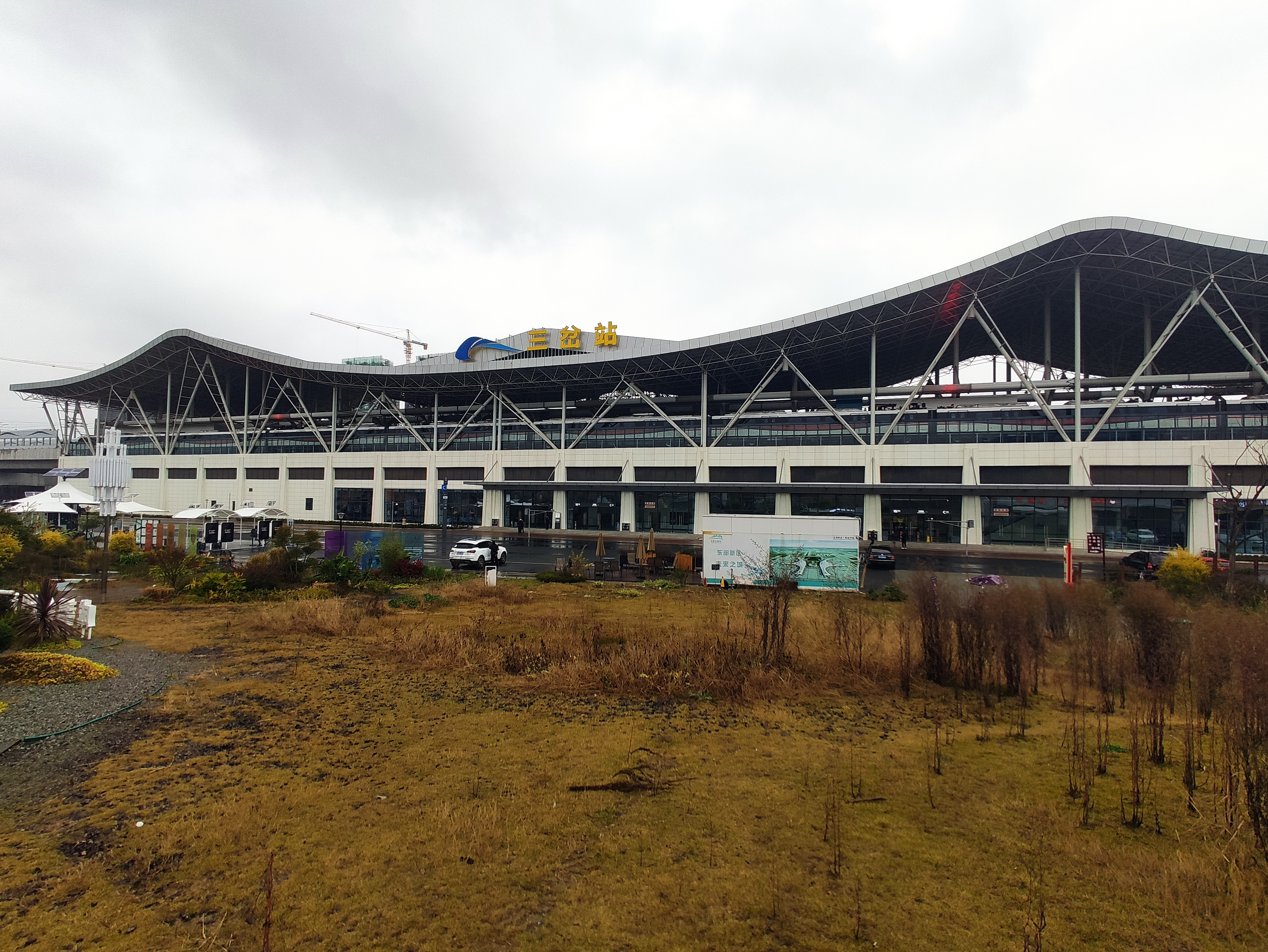

General information
- Location: Jianyang, Chengdu, Sichuan; China
- Coordinates: 30.3139°N 104.3148°E
- Operated by: Chengdu Metro Limited
- Line: Line 18
- Platforms: 4 (2 island platforms)

Other information
- Station code: 1813

History
- Opened: 27 September 2020

Services
Preceding station	Chengdu Metro	Following station
Xinglong towards South Railway Station	Line 18	Futian towards Tianfu International Airport North
Location

Sancha (Chinese: 三岔) is a station on Line 18 of the Chengdu Metro in China.
