= Science City station (Chengdu Metro) =

Metro station in Chengdu, China

Science City 科学城
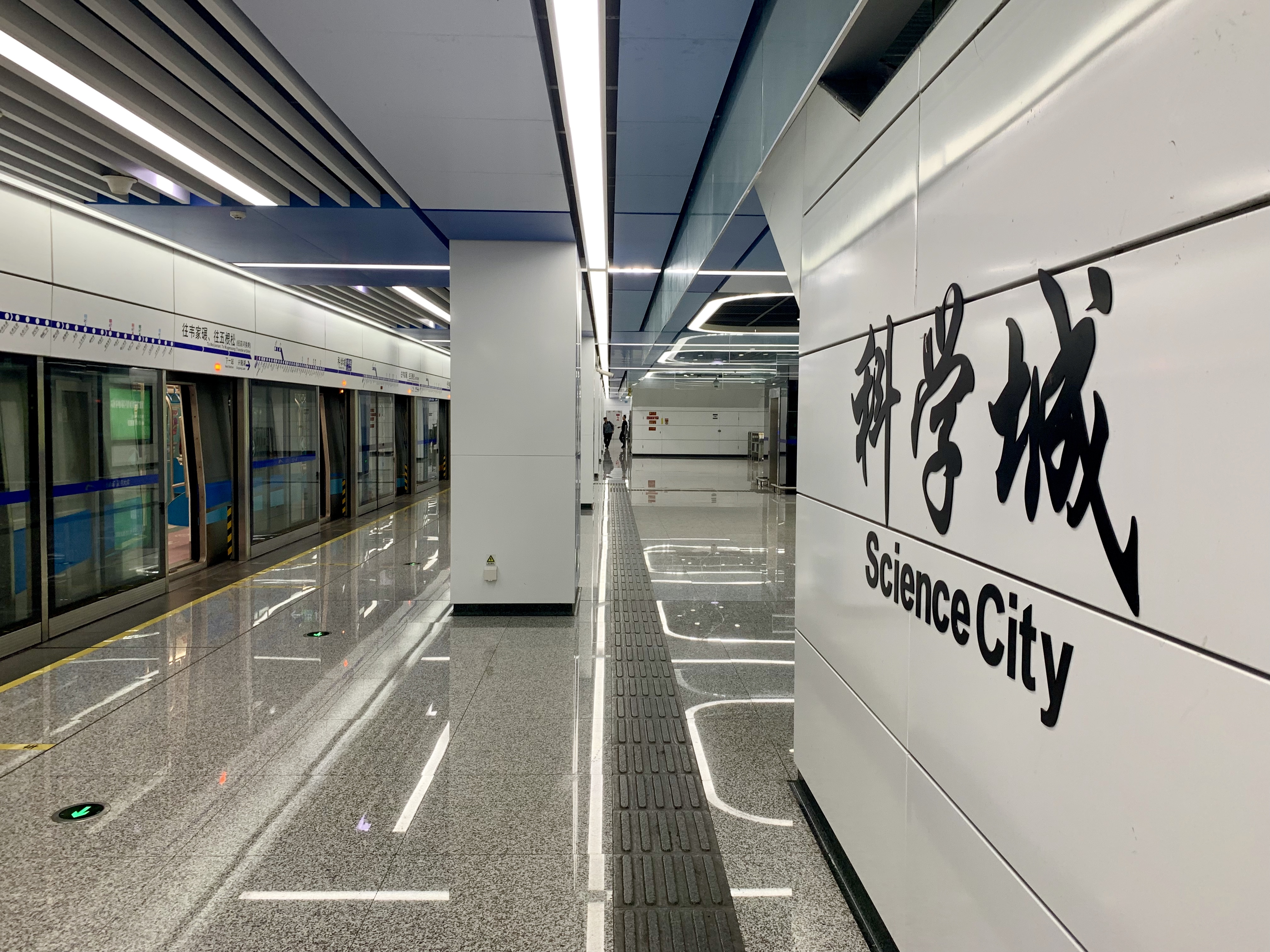

General information
- Location: Shuangliu District, Chengdu, Sichuan; China
- Coordinates: 30.3934°N 104.0705°E
- Operated by: Chengdu Metro Limited
- Line: Line 1
- Platforms: 2 (2 side platforms)

Other information
- Station code: 0133

History
- Opened: 18 March 2018

Services
Preceding station	Chengdu Metro	Following station
Xinglong Lake towards Weijianian	Line 1	Terminus
Location

Science City (Chinese: 科学城) is a station on Line 1 of the Chengdu Metro in China. It is the southern terminus of Line 1.

== Station layout ==
G	Entrances and Exits	Exits A, C, D
B1	Concourse	Faregates, Station Agent
B2	Side platform, doors open on the right
B2	Northbound	← Line 1 towards Weijianian (Xinglong Lake)
B2	Southbound	Line 1 termination track →
B2	Side platform, doors open on the right

== Gallery ==
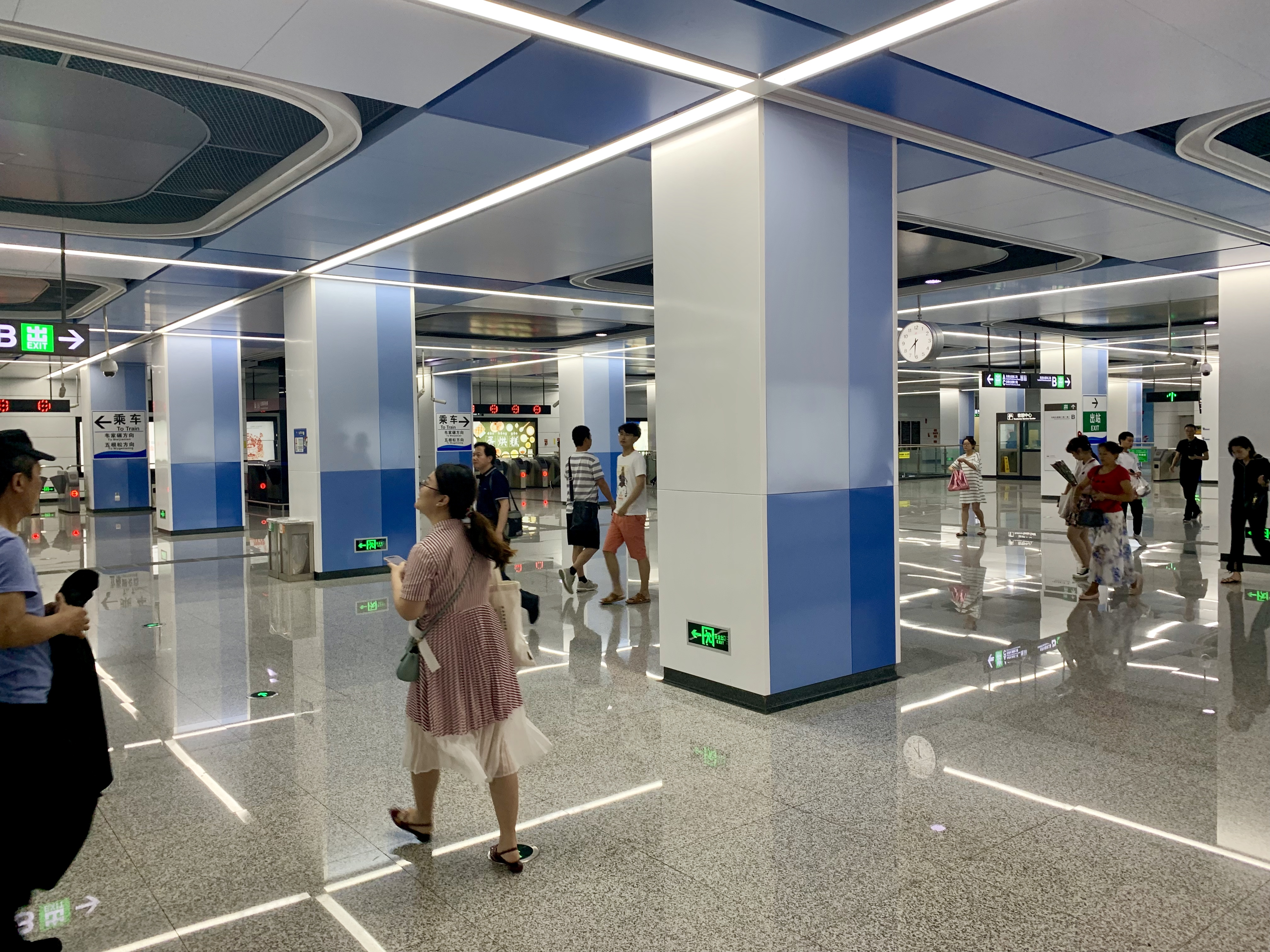
Concourse

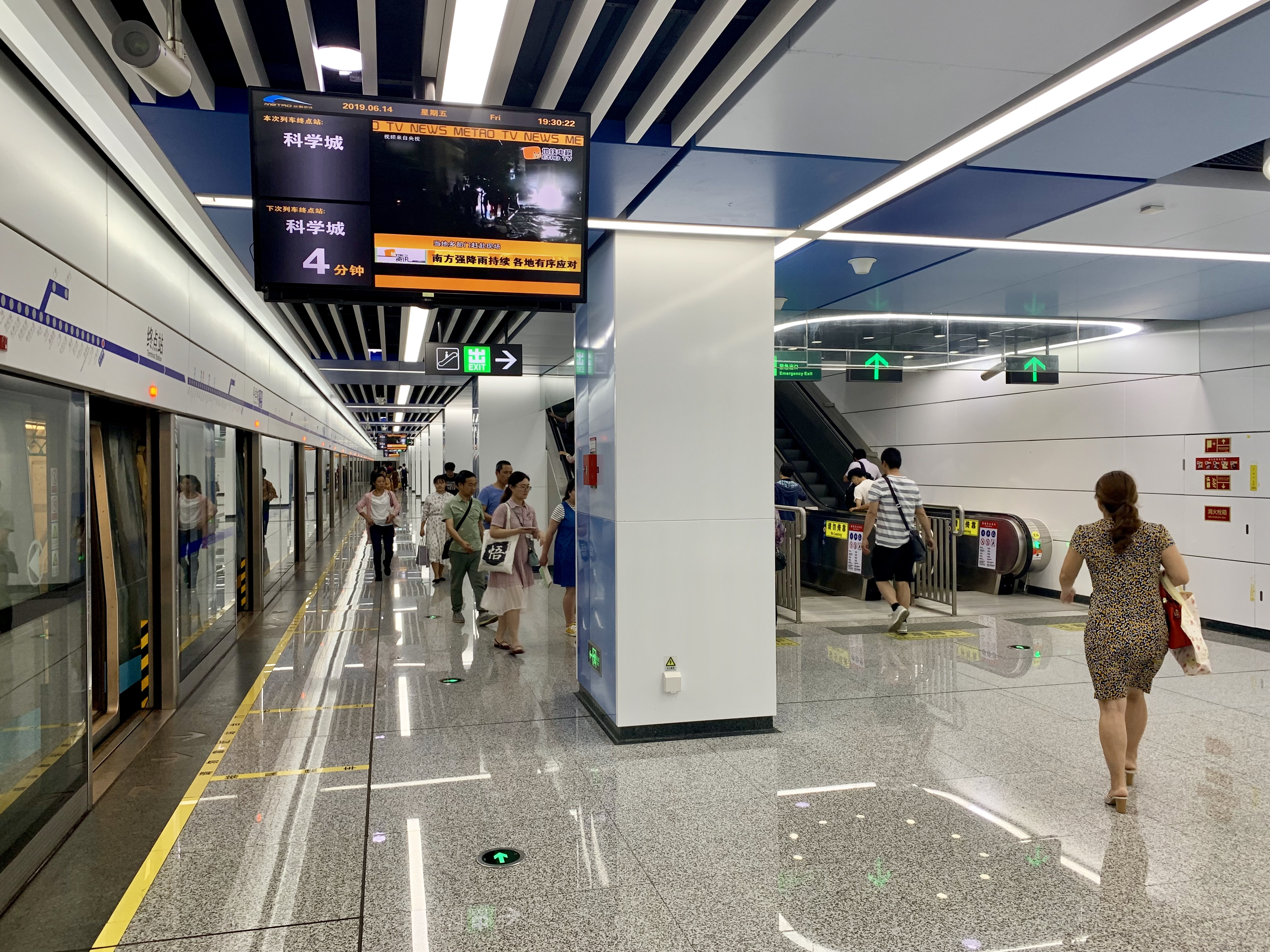
Platform
