= Sihe station =

Metro station in Chengdu, China

Sihe 四河
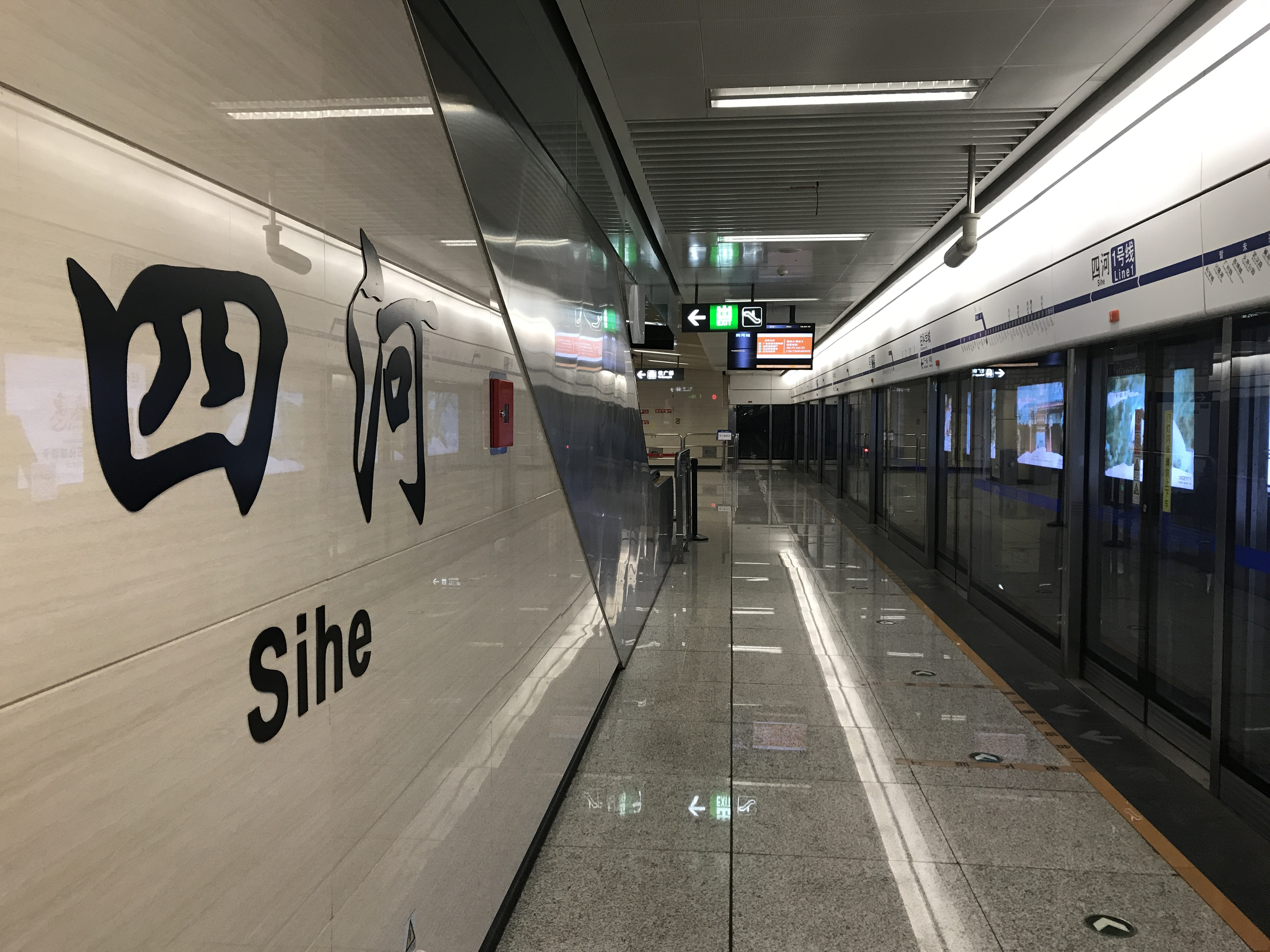

General information
- Location: Shuangliu District, Chengdu, Sichuan; China
- Coordinates: 30.5192°N 104.0699°E
- Operated by: Chengdu Metro Limited
- Line(s): Line 1
- Platforms: 4 (2 island platforms)

Other information
- Station code: 0122

History
- Opened: 25 July 2015

Services
Preceding station	Chengdu Metro	Following station
Huafu Avenue towards Weijianian	Line 1	Huayang towards Science City
Huafu Avenue towards Weijianian	Line 1	Guangdu towards Wugensong

Sihe (Chinese: 四河) is a station on Line 1 of the Chengdu Metro in China.

== Station layout ==
G	Entrances and Exits	Exits A-D
B1	Concourse	Faregates, Station Agent
B2	Northbound	← Line 1 towards Weijianian (Huafu Avenue)
B2	Island platform, doors open on the left/right
B2	Northbound	← Line 1 towards Weijianian (Huafu Avenue)
B2	Southbound	Line 1 towards Wugensong (Guangdu) →
B2	Island platform, doors open on the left/right
B2	Southbound	Line 1 towards Science City (Huayang) →

== Gallery ==
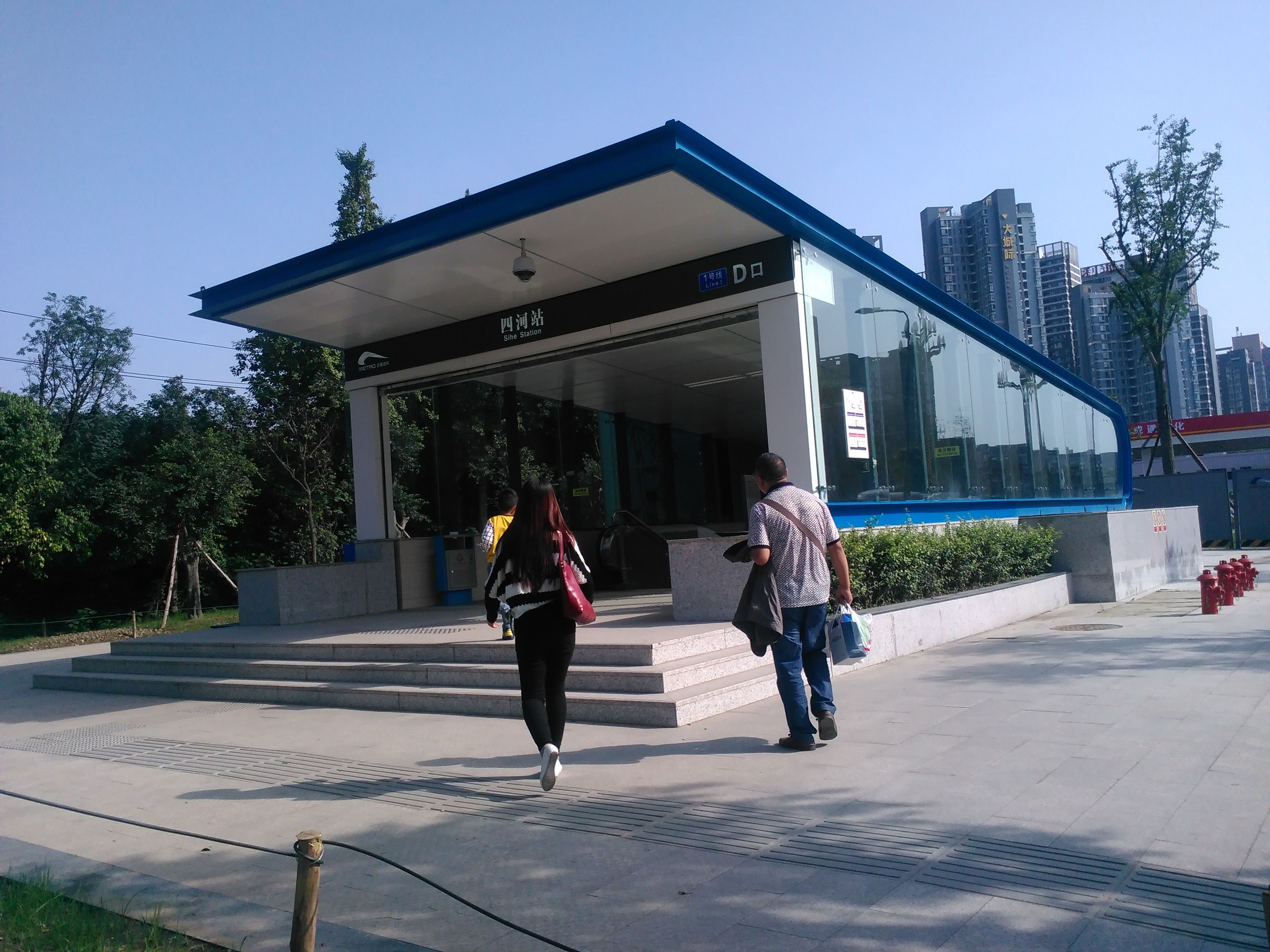
Entrance D

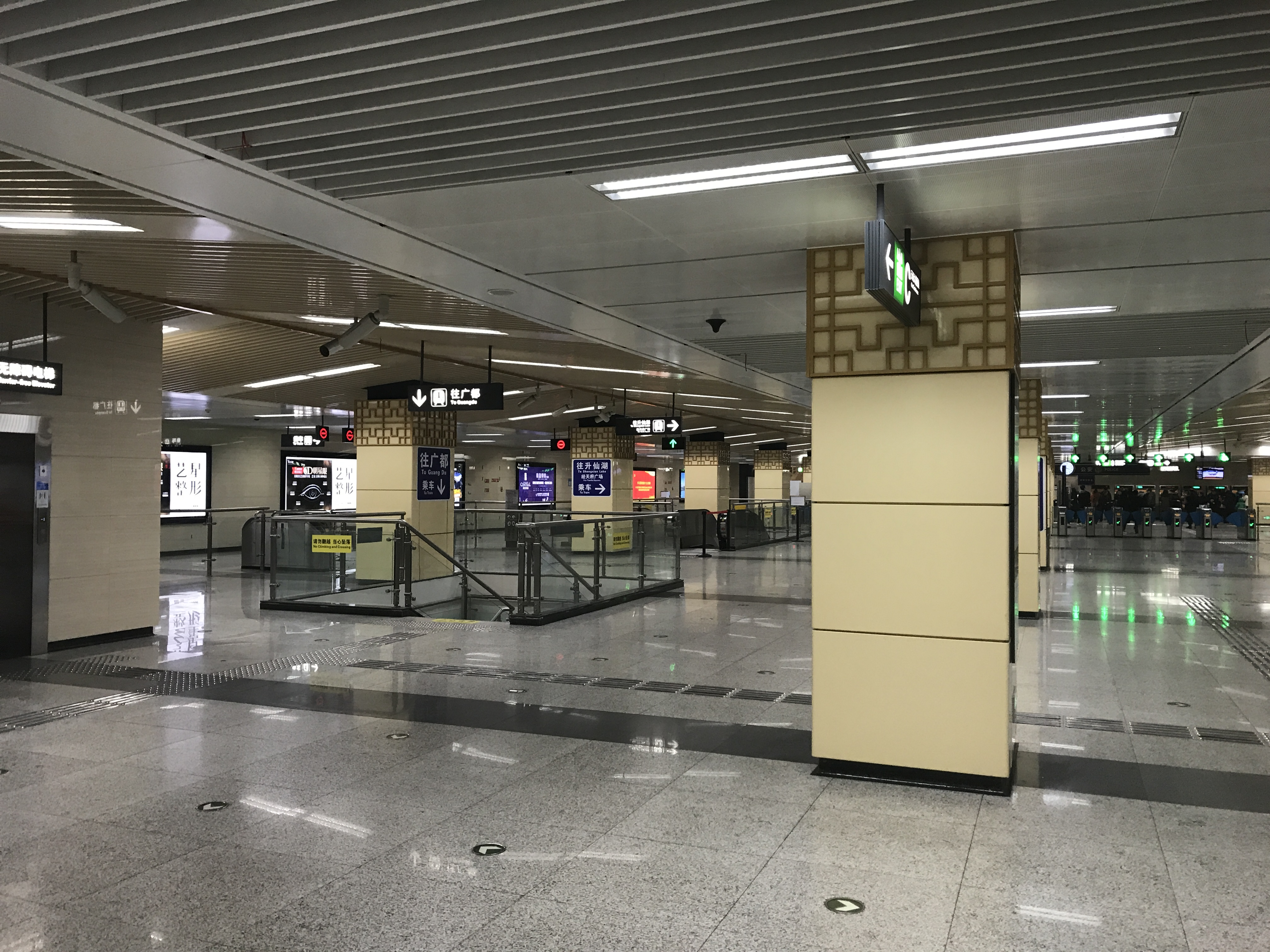
Concourse

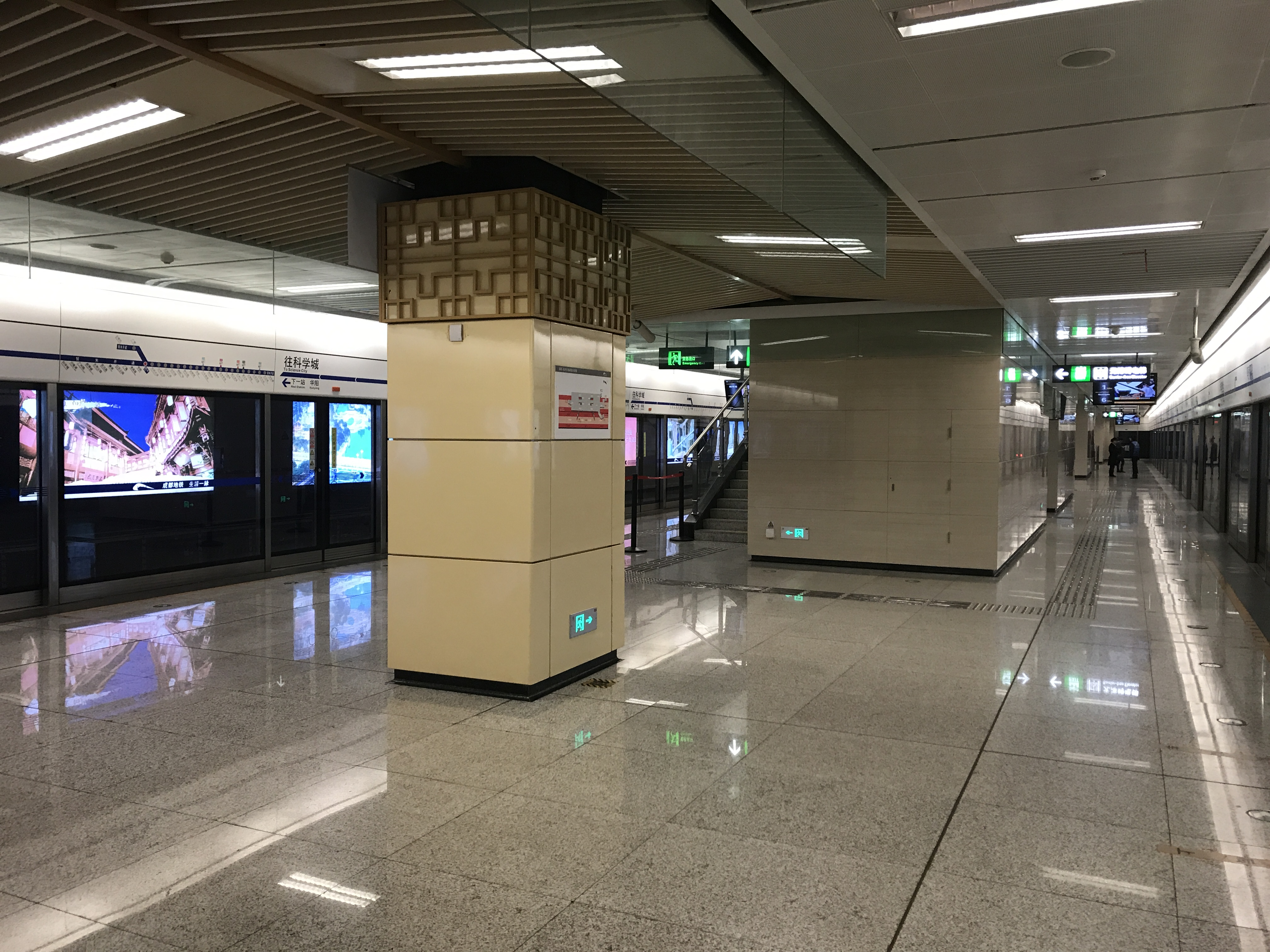
Platform
