= 5th Tianfu Street station =

Metro station in Chengdu, China

5th Tianfu Street 天府五街
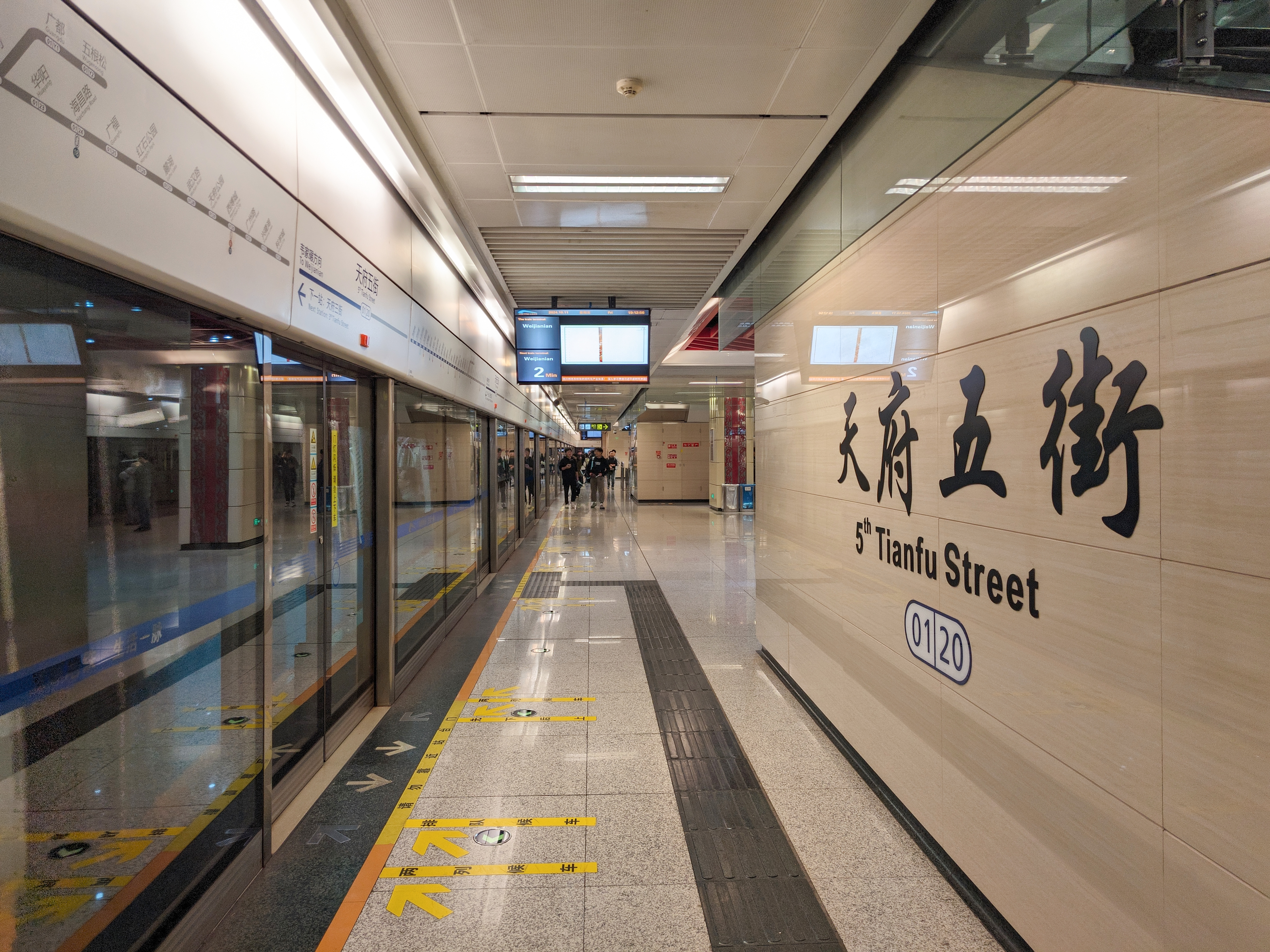

General information
- Location: Wuhou District, Chengdu, Sichuan; China
- Coordinates: 30.5422°N 104.0698°E
- Operated by: Chengdu Metro Limited
- Line(s): Line 1
- Platforms: 2 (1 island platform)

Other information
- Station code: 0120

History
- Opened: 25 July 2015

Services
Preceding station	Chengdu Metro	Following station
3rd Tianfu Street towards Weijianian	Line 1	Huafu Avenue towards Science City or Wugensong

5th Tianfu Street (Chinese: 天府五街) is a station on Line 1 of the Chengdu Metro in China.

== Station layout ==
G	Entrances and Exits	Exits A-C
B1	Concourse	Faregates, Station Agent
B2	Northbound	← Line 1 towards Weijianian (3rd Tianfu Street)
B2	Island platform, doors open on the left
B2	Southbound	Line 1 towards Science City (Huafu Avenue) →

== Gallery ==
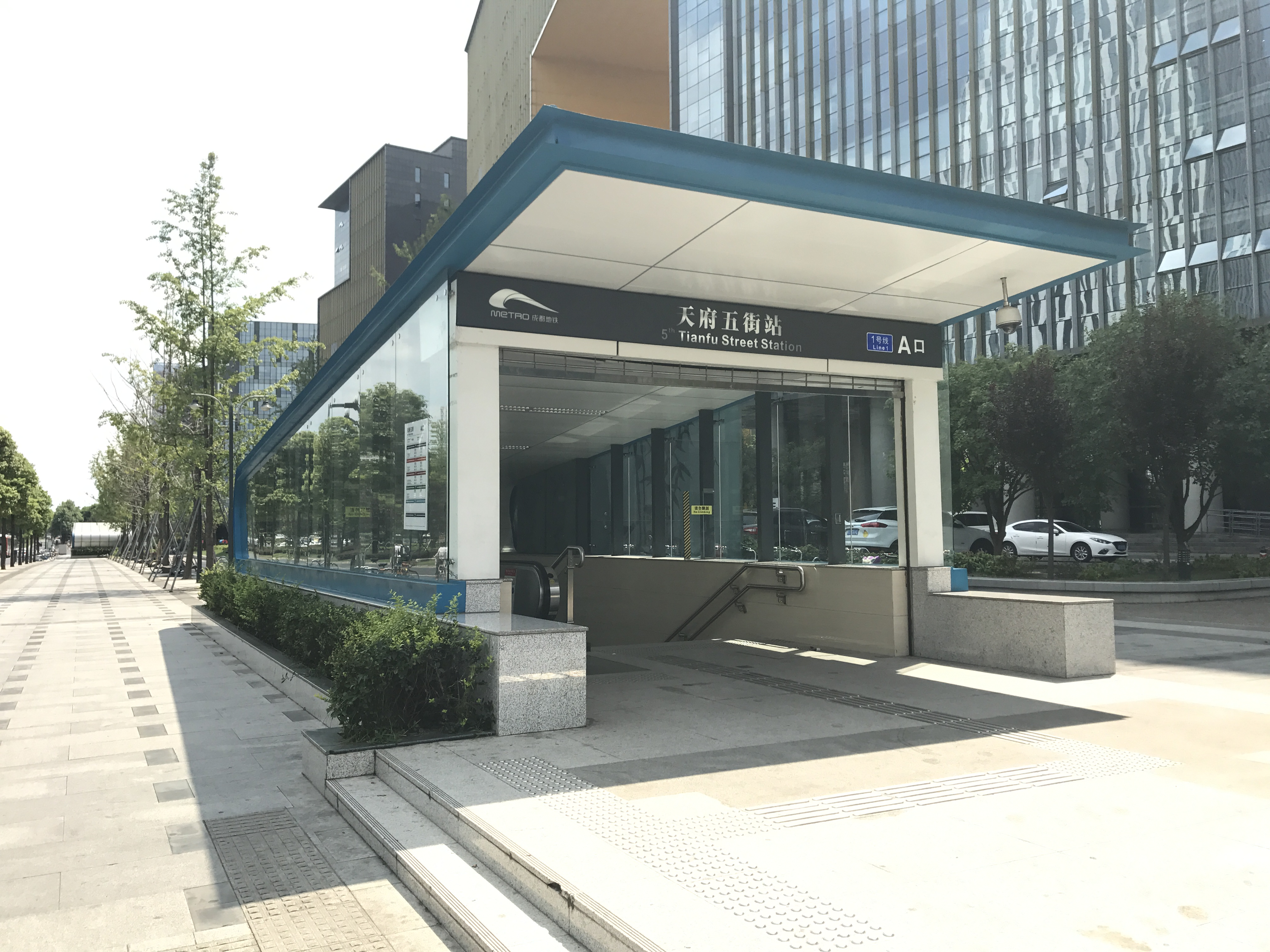
Entrance A

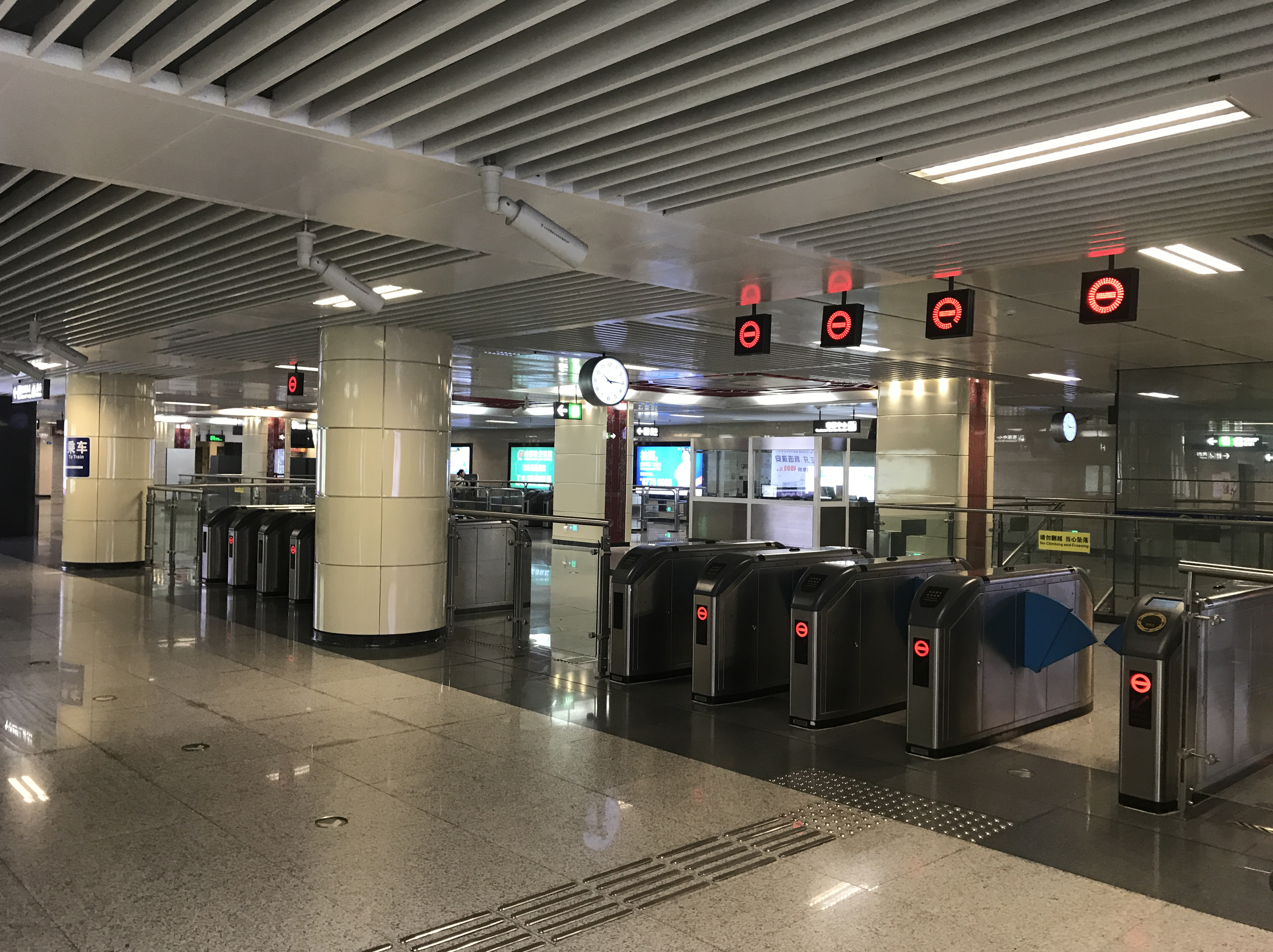
Concourse

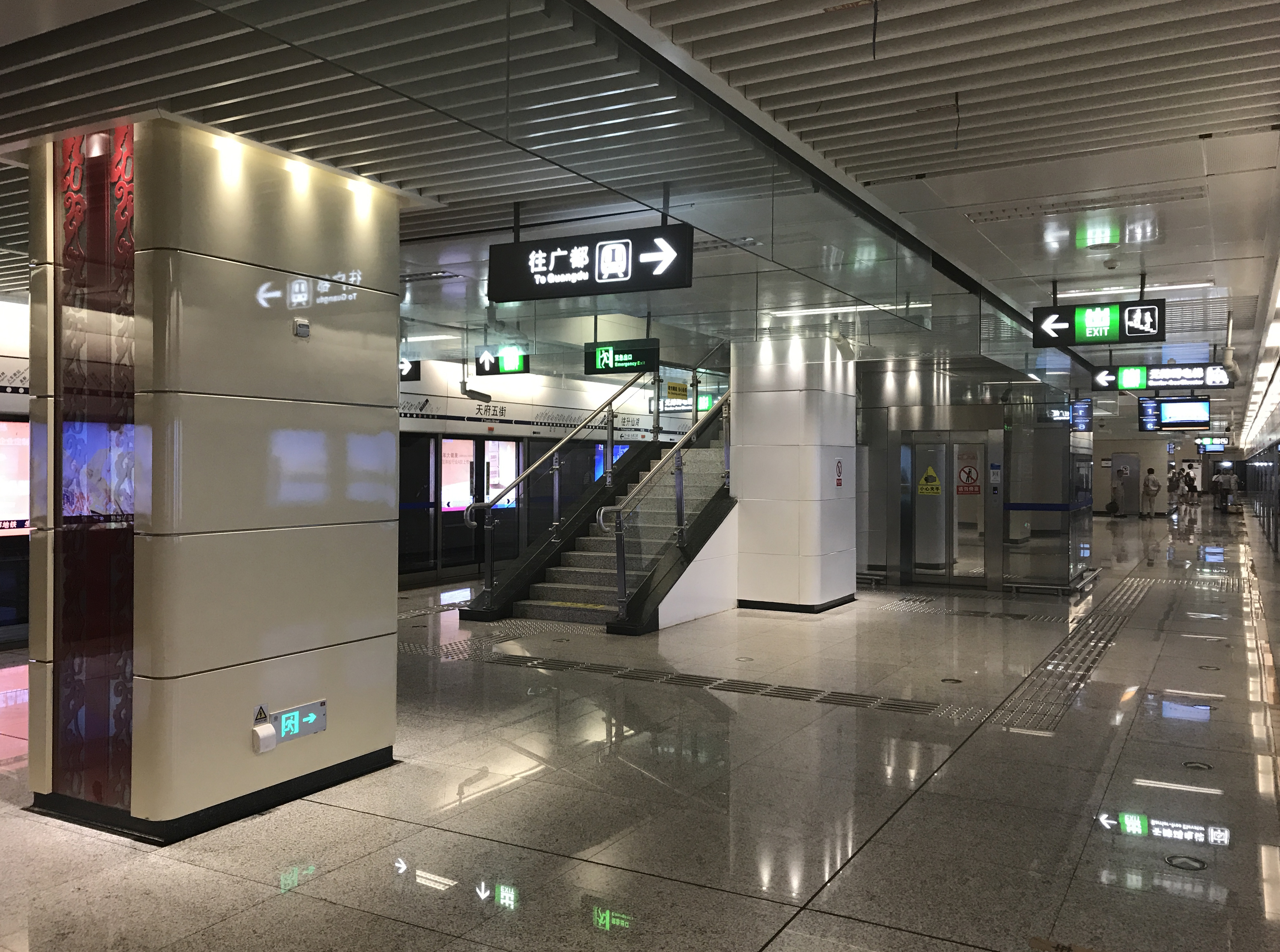
Platform
