= Shengxian Lake station =

Metro station in Chengdu, China

Shengxian Lake 升仙湖
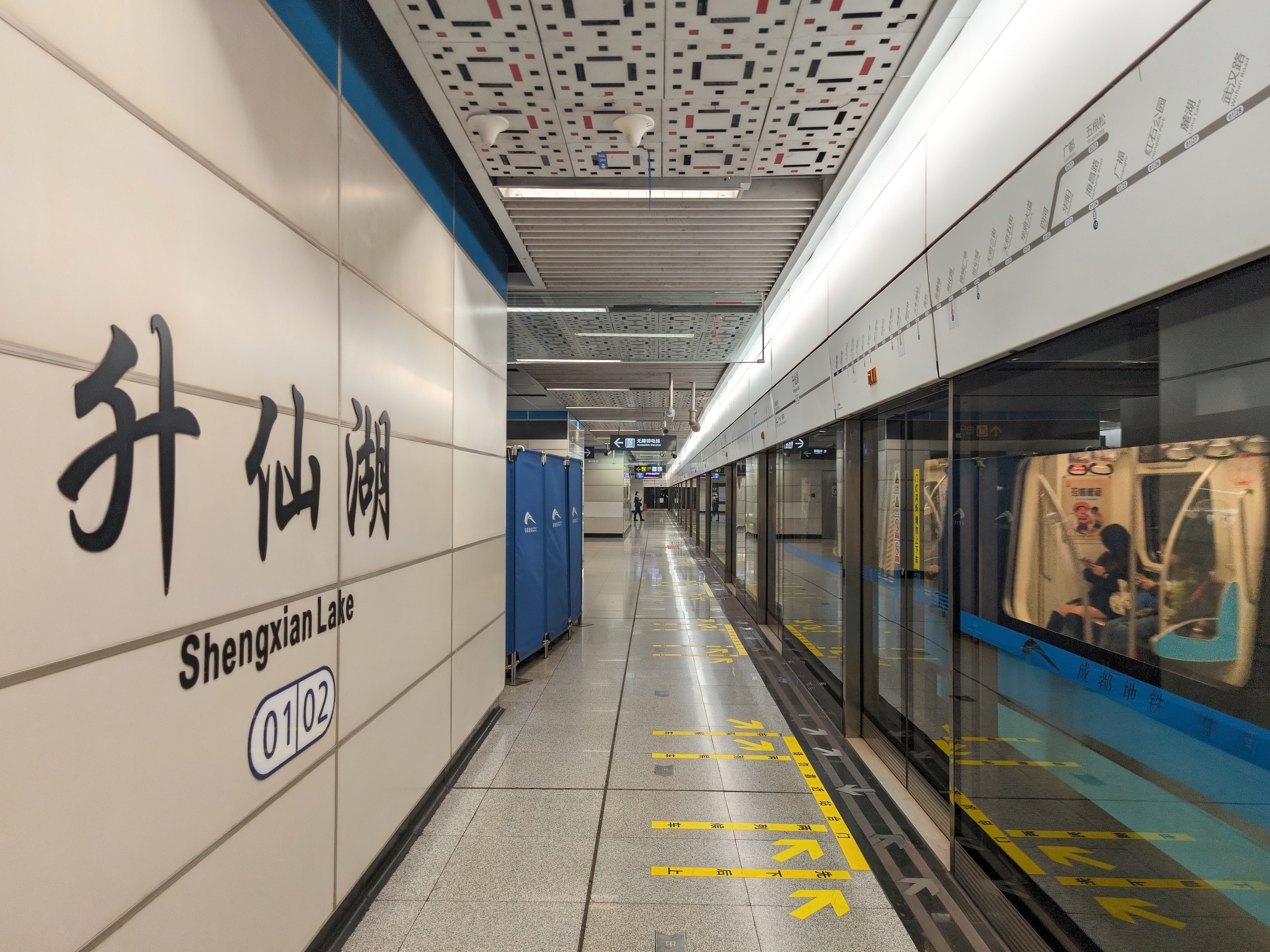

General information
- Location: Chenghua District, Chengdu, Sichuan; China
- Coordinates: 30.7071°N 104.0809°E
- Operator: Chengdu Metro Limited
- Line: Line 1
- Platforms: 2 (1 island platform)

Other information
- Station code: 0102

History
- Opened: 27 September 2010

Services
| Preceding station | Chengdu Metro | Following station |
|---|---|---|
| Weijianian Terminus | Line 1 | North Railway Station towards Science City or Wugensong |
Location

Shengxian Lake (Chinese: 升仙湖) is a metro station on Line 1 of the Chengdu Metro in China.

== Station layout ==
| G | Entrances and Exits | Exits A, B |
| B1 | Concourse | Faregates, Station Agent |
| B2 | Northbound | ← Line 1 towards Weijianian (Terminus) |
| B2 | Island platform, doors open on the left |
| B2 | Southbound | Line 1 towards Science City (North Railway Station) → |

== Gallery ==
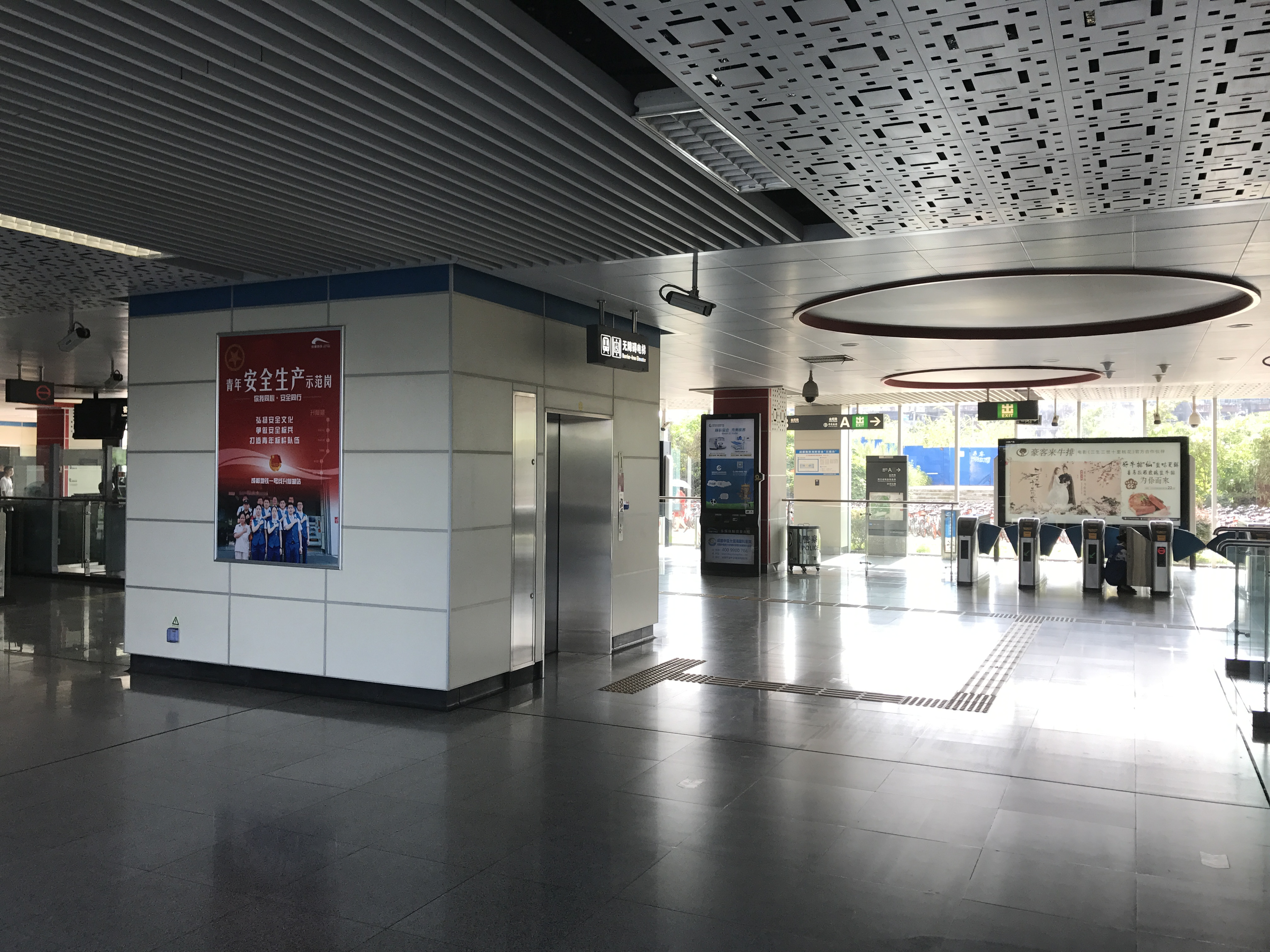
Concourse

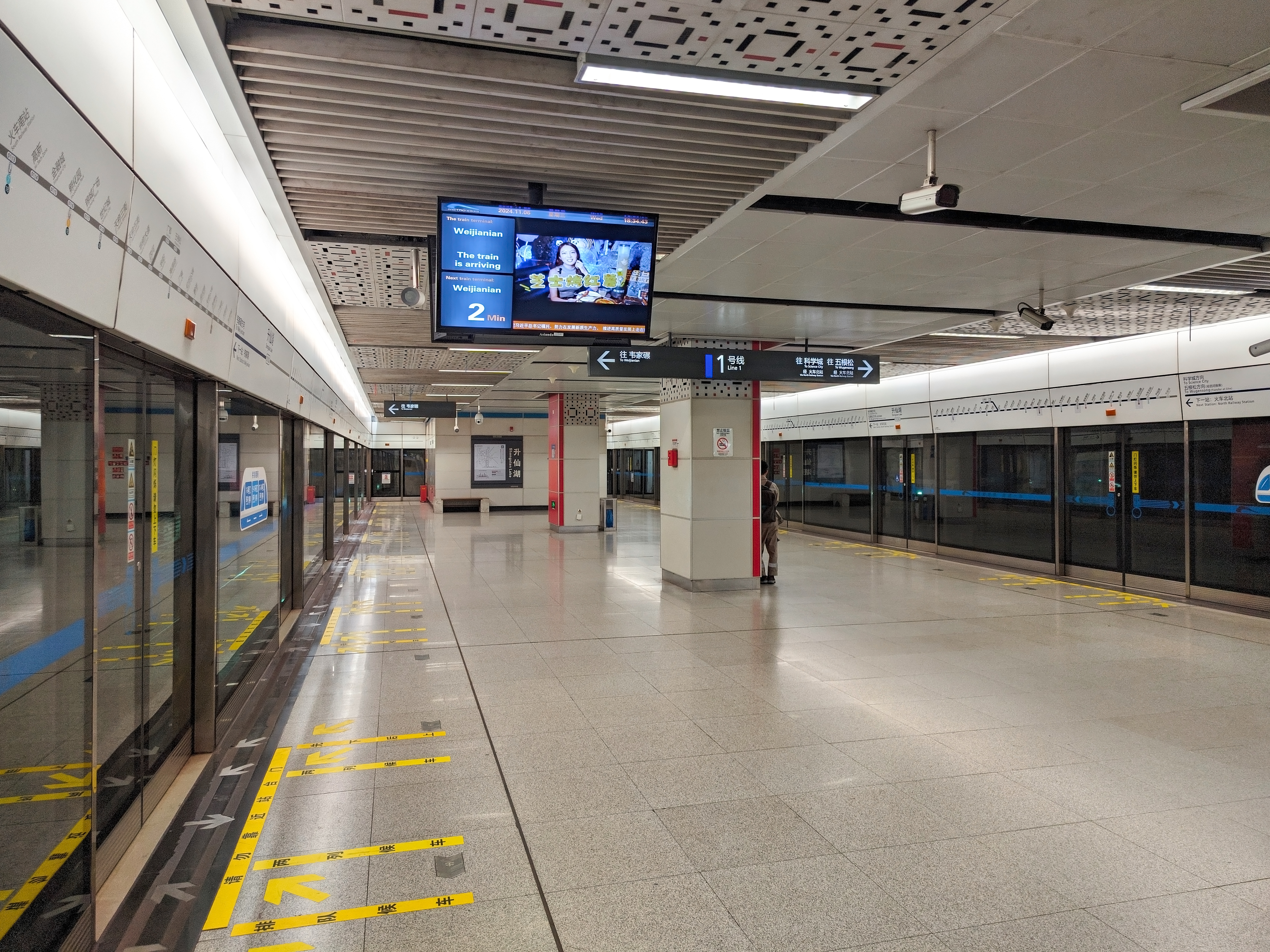
Platform
