= Guangdu station =

Metro station in Chengdu, China

Guangdu 广都
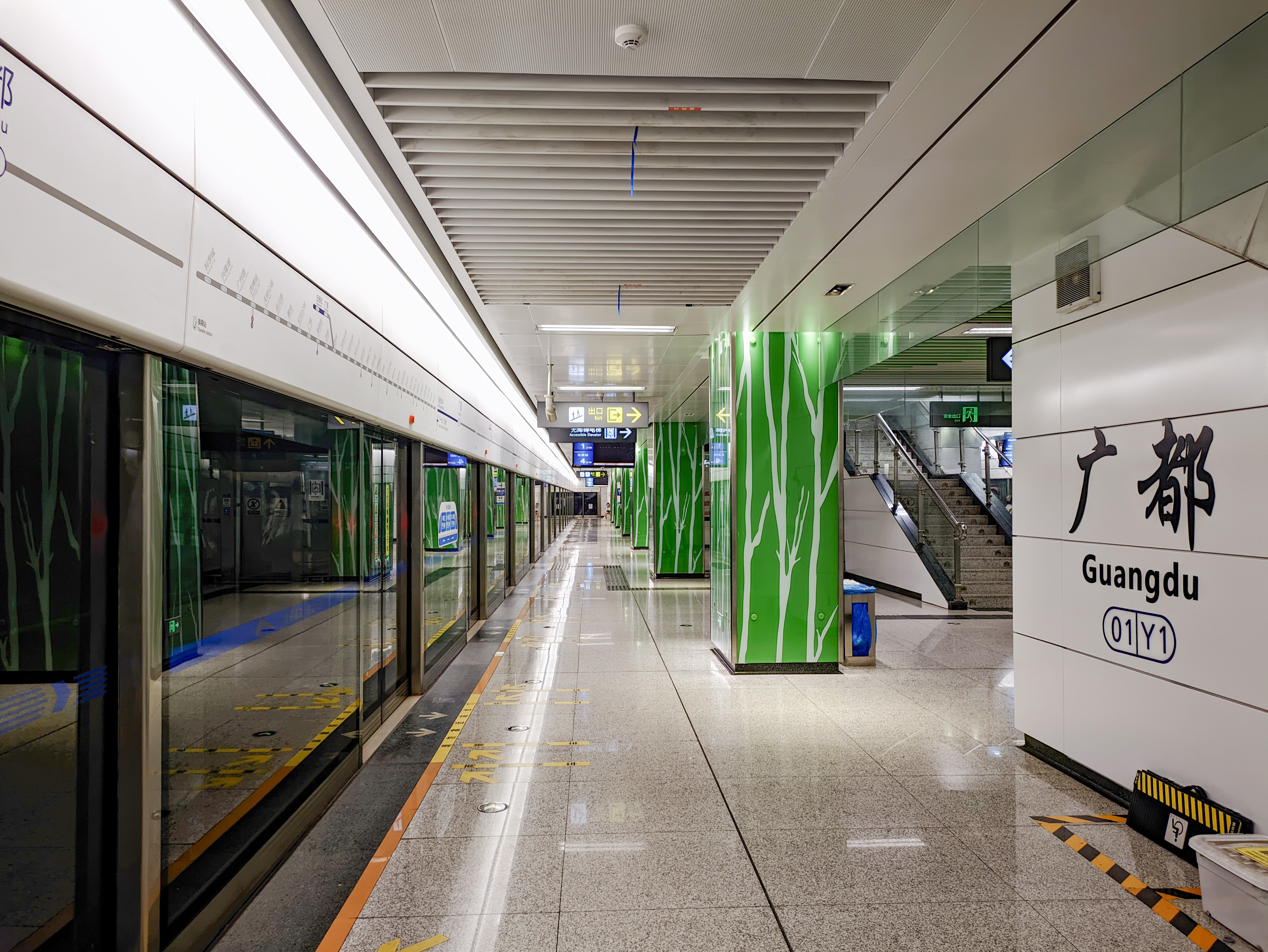
- Platform of Guangdu station

General information
- Location: Shuangliu District, Chengdu, Sichuan; China
- Operated by: Chengdu Metro Limited
- Line: Line 1
- Platforms: 2 (1 island platform)

Other information
- Station code: 01Y1

History
- Opened: 25 July 2015

Services
Preceding station	Chengdu Metro	Following station
Sihe towards Weijianian	Line 1	Wugensong Terminus
Location

Guangdu (Chinese: 广都) is a station on Line 1 of the Chengdu Metro in China.

== Station layout ==
G	Entrances and Exits	Exits A-C
B1	Concourse	Faregates, Station Agent
B2	Northbound	← Line 1 towards Weijianian (Sihe)
B2	Island platform, doors open on the left
B2	Southbound	Line 1 towards Wugensong (Terminus) →

== Gallery ==
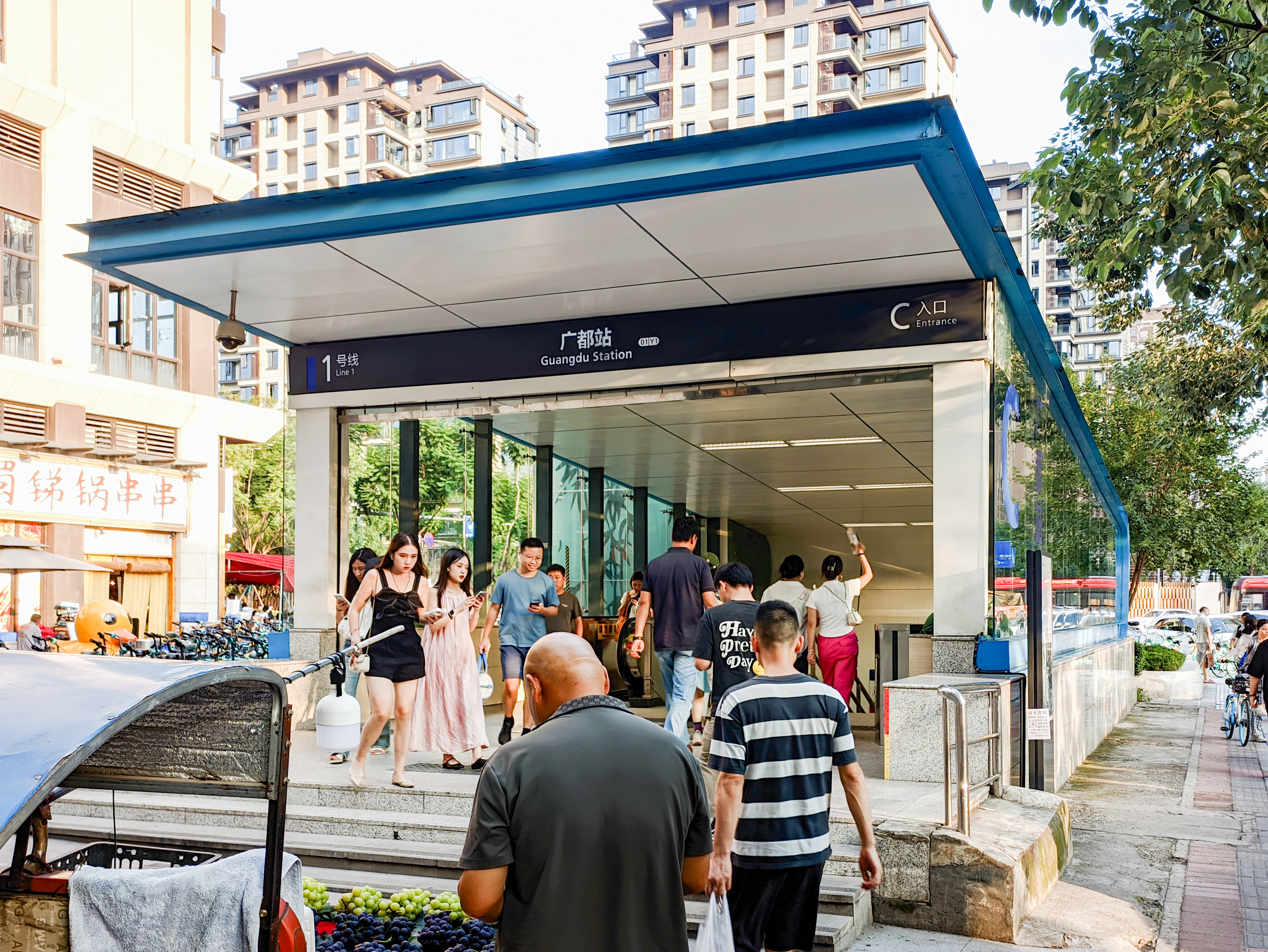
Entrance C

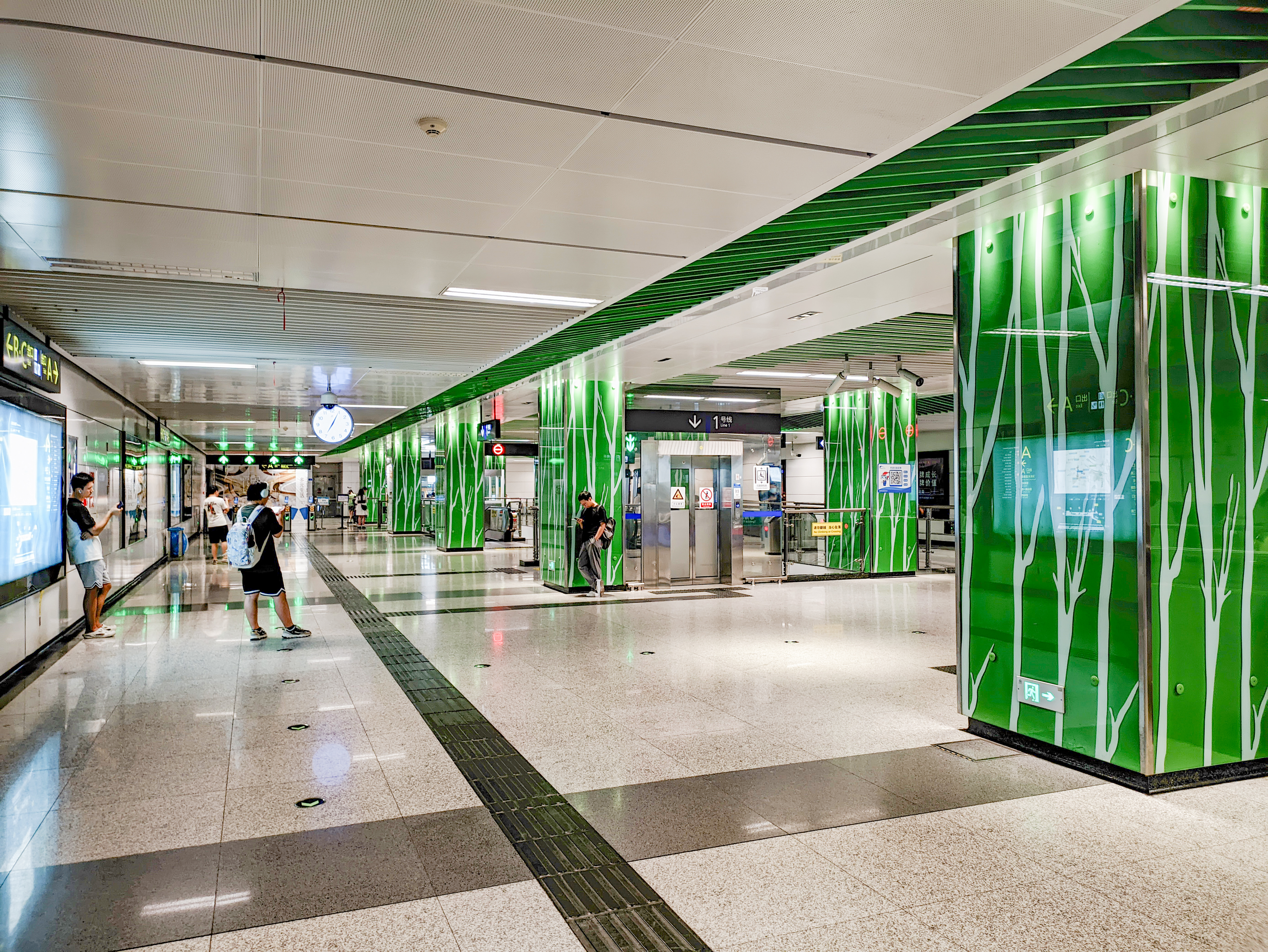
Concourse

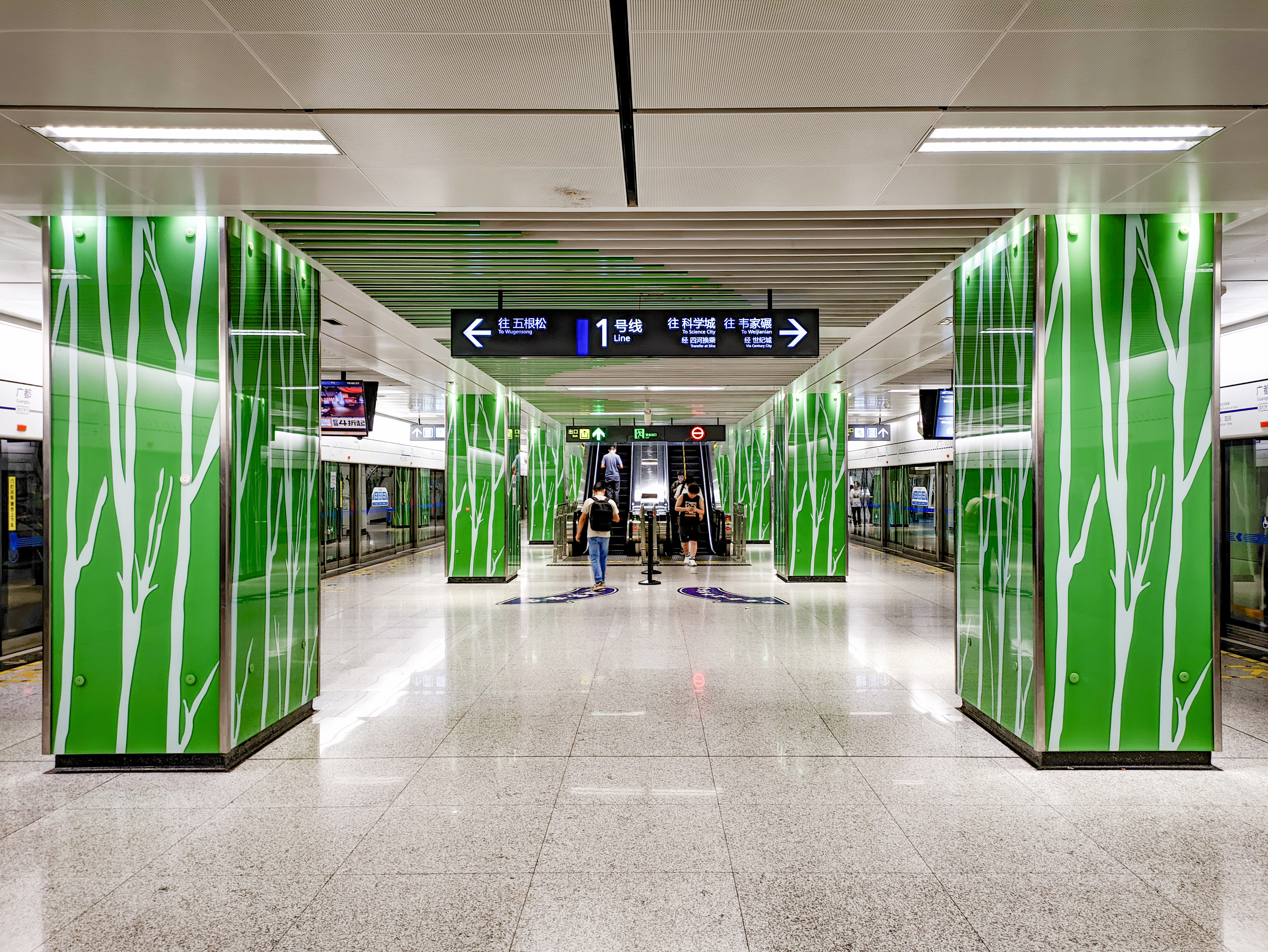
Platform
