= Huayang station =

Metro station in Chengdu, China

Huayang 华阳
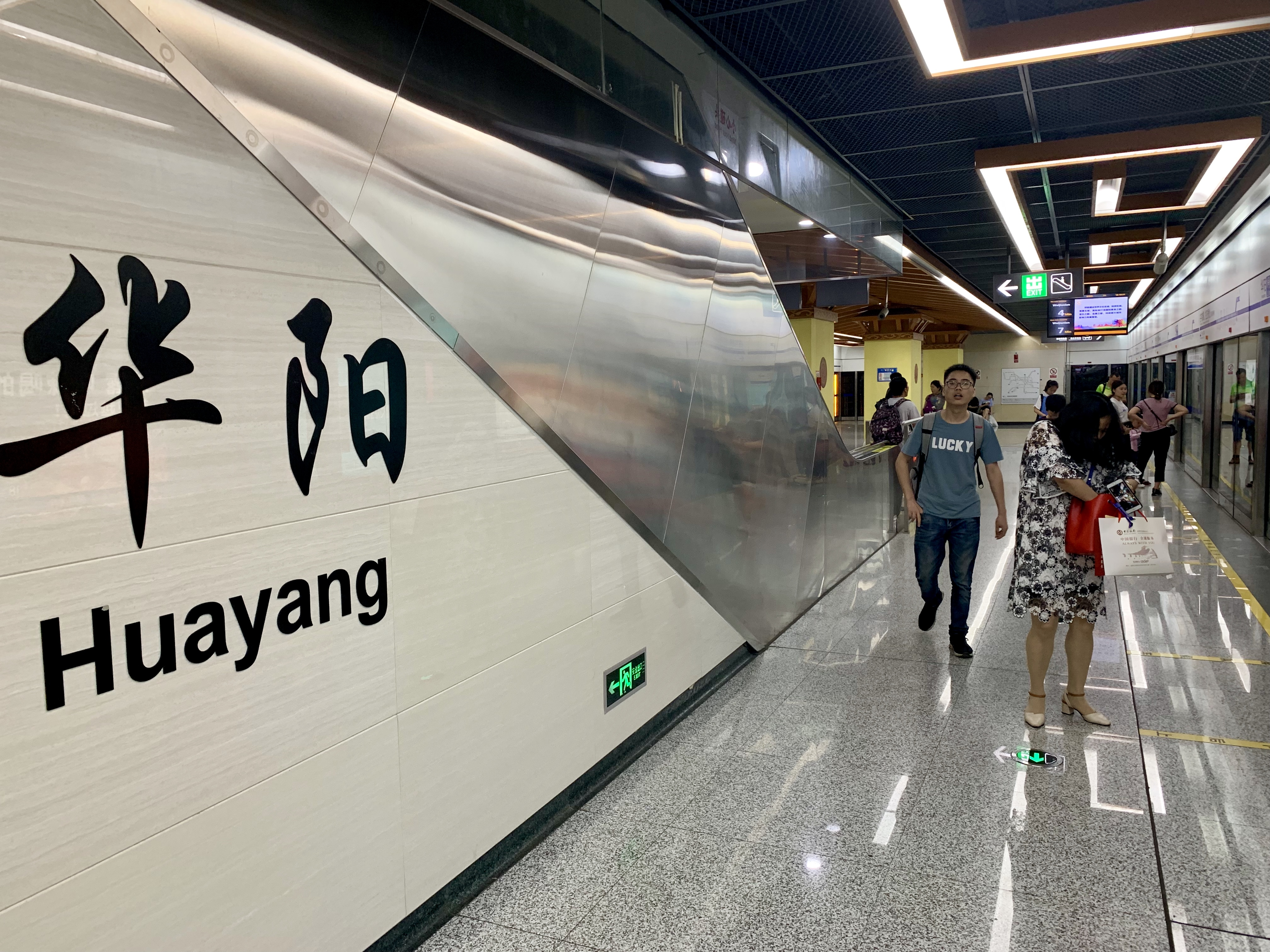

General information
- Location: Shuangliu District, Chengdu, Sichuan; China
- Coordinates: 30.5060°N 104.0694°E
- Operated by: Chengdu Metro Limited
- Line(s): Line 1
- Platforms: 2 (1 island platform)

Other information
- Station code: 0123

History
- Opened: 18 March 2018

Services
Preceding station	Chengdu Metro	Following station
Sihe towards Weijianian	Line 1	Haichang Road towards Science City

Huayang (Chinese: 华阳) is a station on Line 1 of the Chengdu Metro in China.

== Station layout ==
G	Entrances and Exits	Exits A-C
B1	Concourse	Faregates, Station Agent
B2	Northbound	← Line 1 towards Weijianian (Sihe)
B2	Island platform, doors open on the left
B2	Southbound	Line 1 towards Science City (Haichang Road) →

== Gallery ==
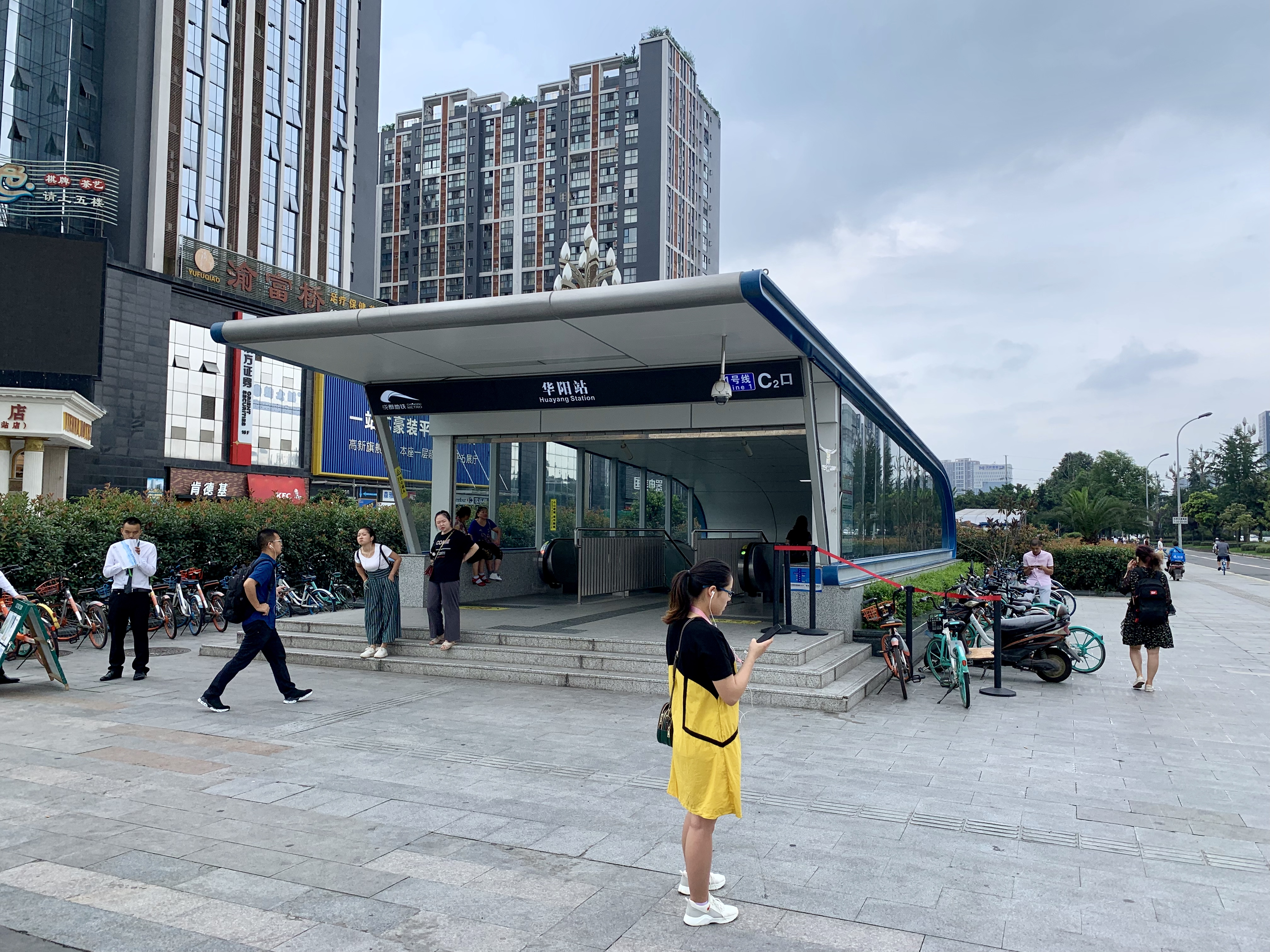
Entrance C2

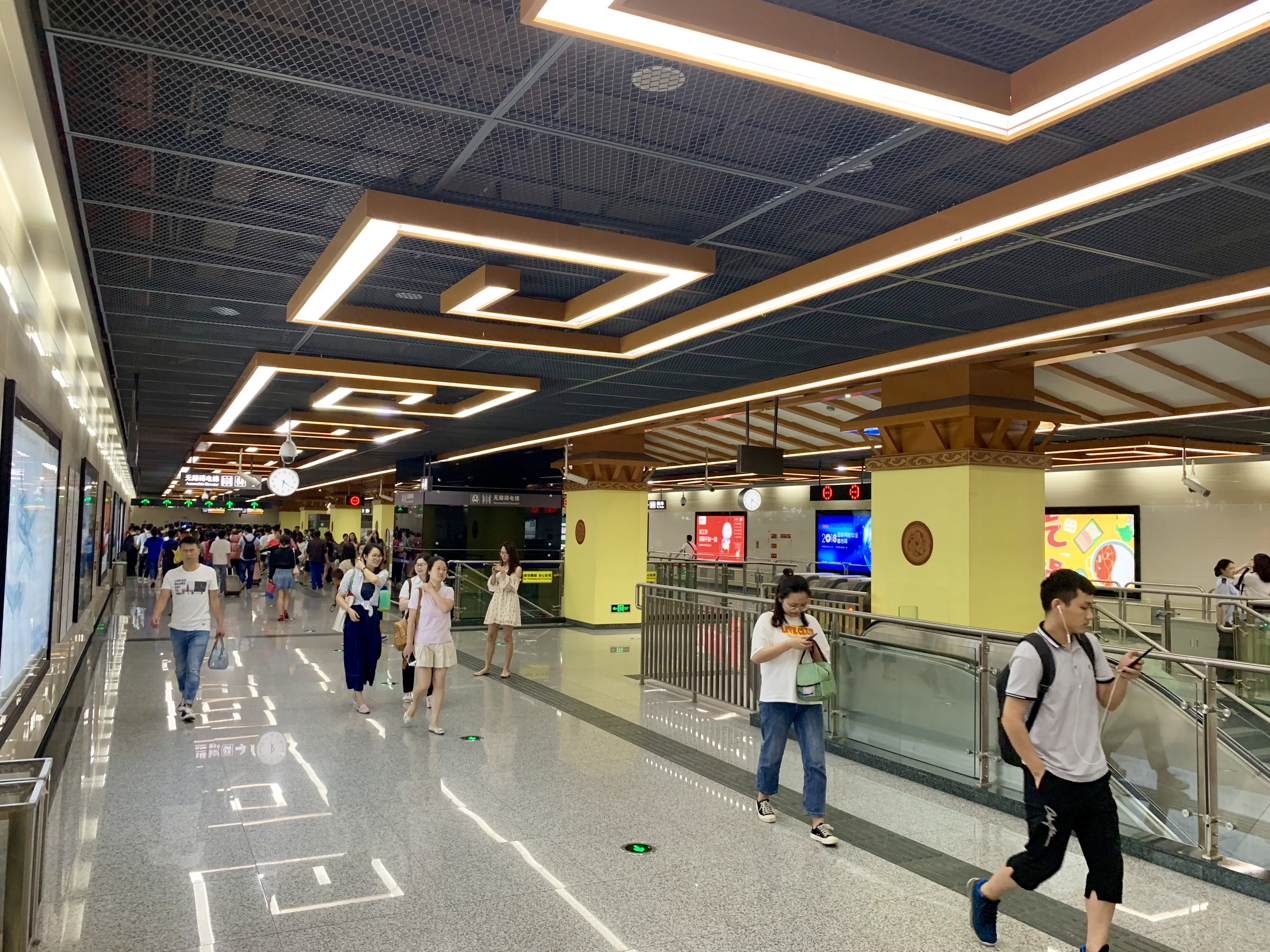
Concourse

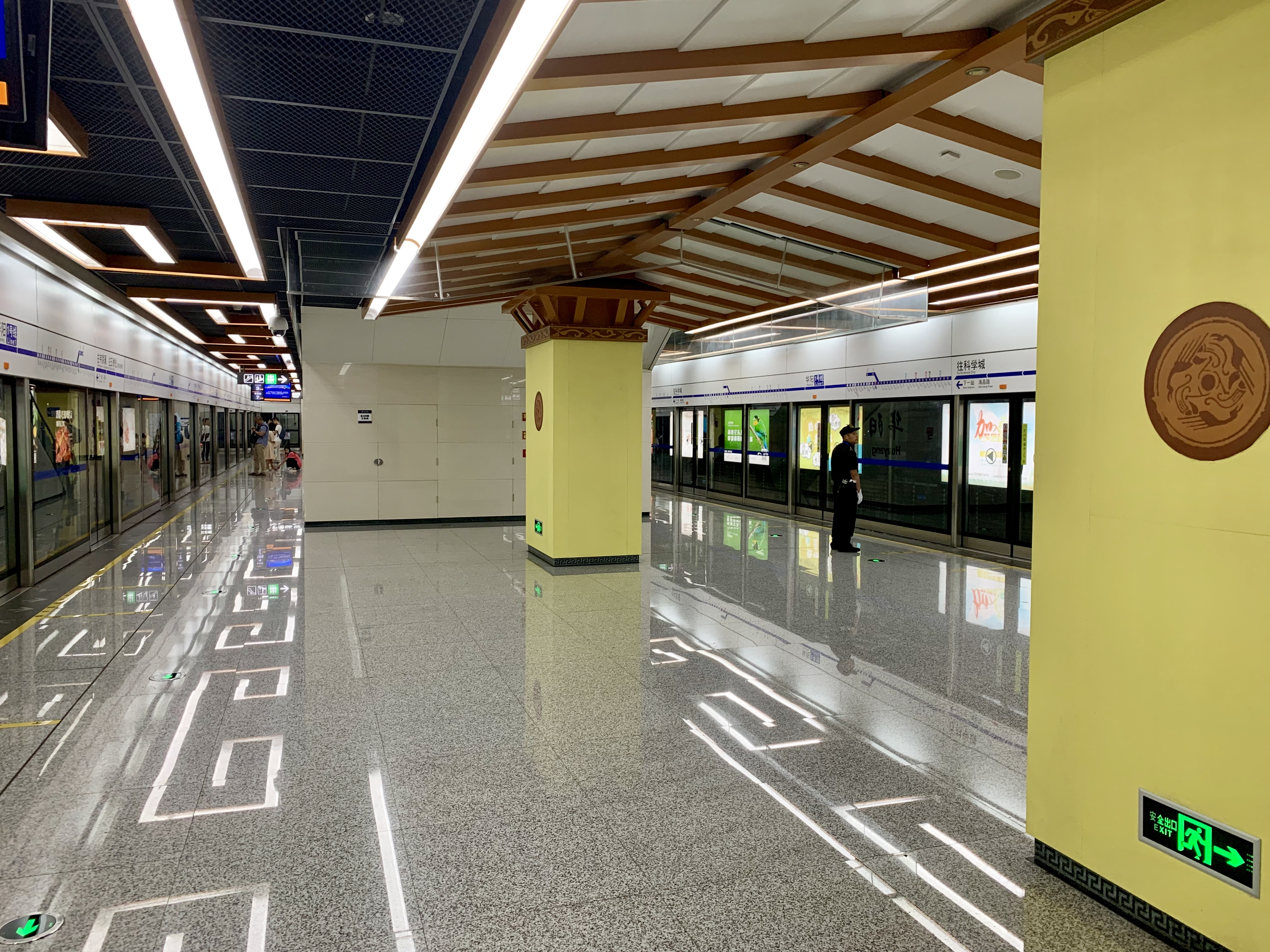
Platform
