= Line 1 (Chengdu Metro) =

Metro line in Chengdu, China

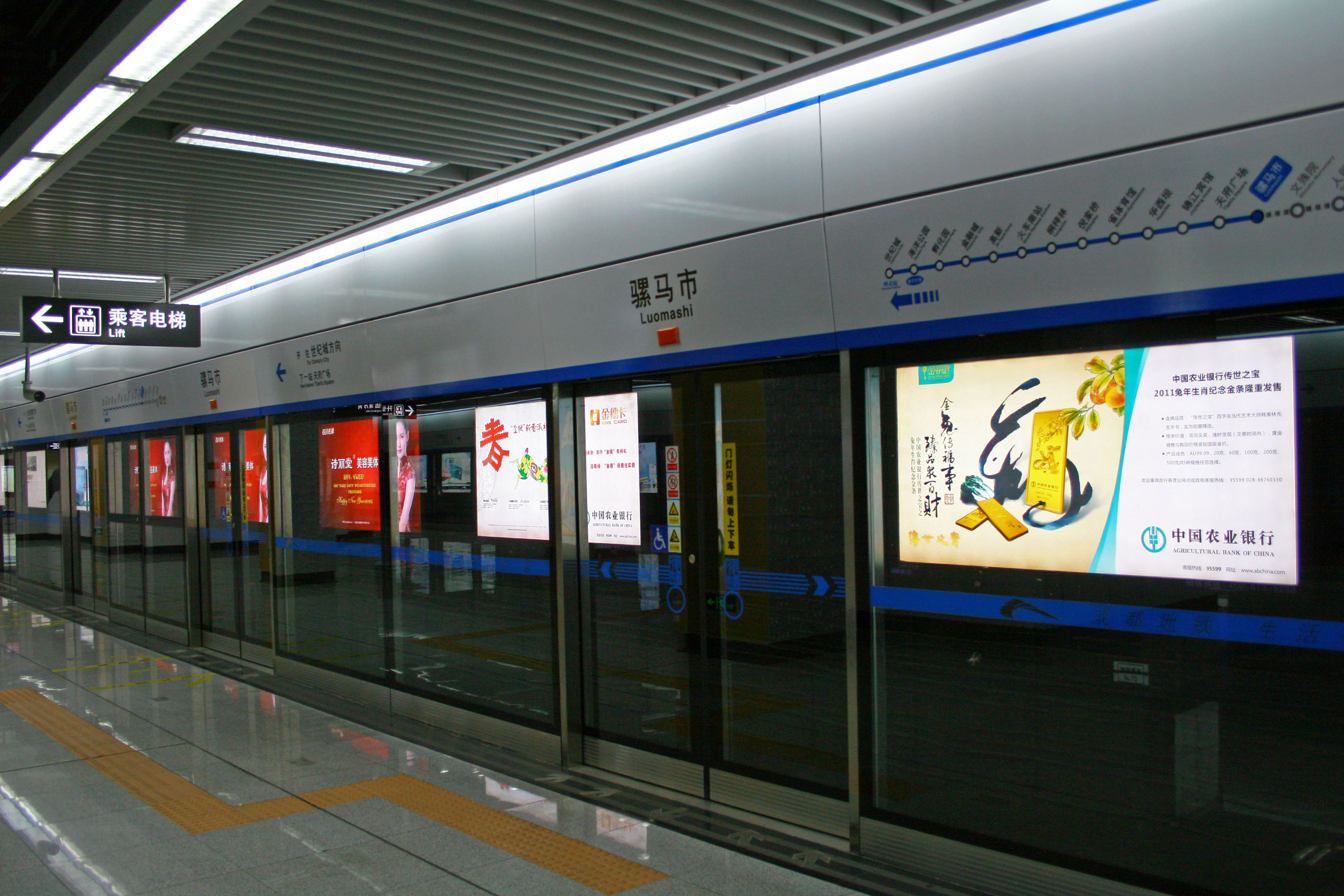
- Platform of Luomashi station

Overview
- Status: Operational
- Owner: Chengdu
- Locale: Chengdu, China
- Termini: Weijianian; Science City Wugensong
- Stations: 35
- Colour on map: Dark blue (#452E5B)

Service
- Type: Rapid transit
- System: Chengdu Metro
- Services: 1
- Operator(s): Chengdu Metro Limited
- Daily ridership: 1.0781 million (2018 Peak)

History
- Opened: 27 September 2010; 15 years ago

Technical
- Line length: 41.0 km (25.48 mi)
- Number of tracks: 2
- Character: Underground
- Track gauge: 1,435 mm (4 ft 8 1/2 in)
- Electrification: Overhead lines, 1500 V DC
- Operating speed: 80 km/h (50 mph)

Line 1 of the Chengdu Metro (Chinese: 成都地铁1号线; pinyin: Chéngdū Dìtiě Yī Hào Xiàn) is the first line to enter revenue service on the metro network in Chengdu, Sichuan, China. The line started construction in 2005, and entered service on September 27, 2010. On July 25, 2015, an extension towards Guangdu was opened for service.

Line 1 is a crosstown north-south trunk route, stretching from Weijianian in the north of town to Science City in southern Chengdu. This line serves both the northern and the southern railway stations.

Between Chengdu South Railway Station and Western China International Expo City Station, the line runs adjacent to Line 18 essentially forming a four track subway. Line 1 operates as the local service between the two stations while Line 18 serves as the express, skipping a number of stops that Line 1 makes. The four track alignment with Line 18 will be extended to North Railway Station once Phase 3 of Line 18's construction is completed.

== Opening timeline ==
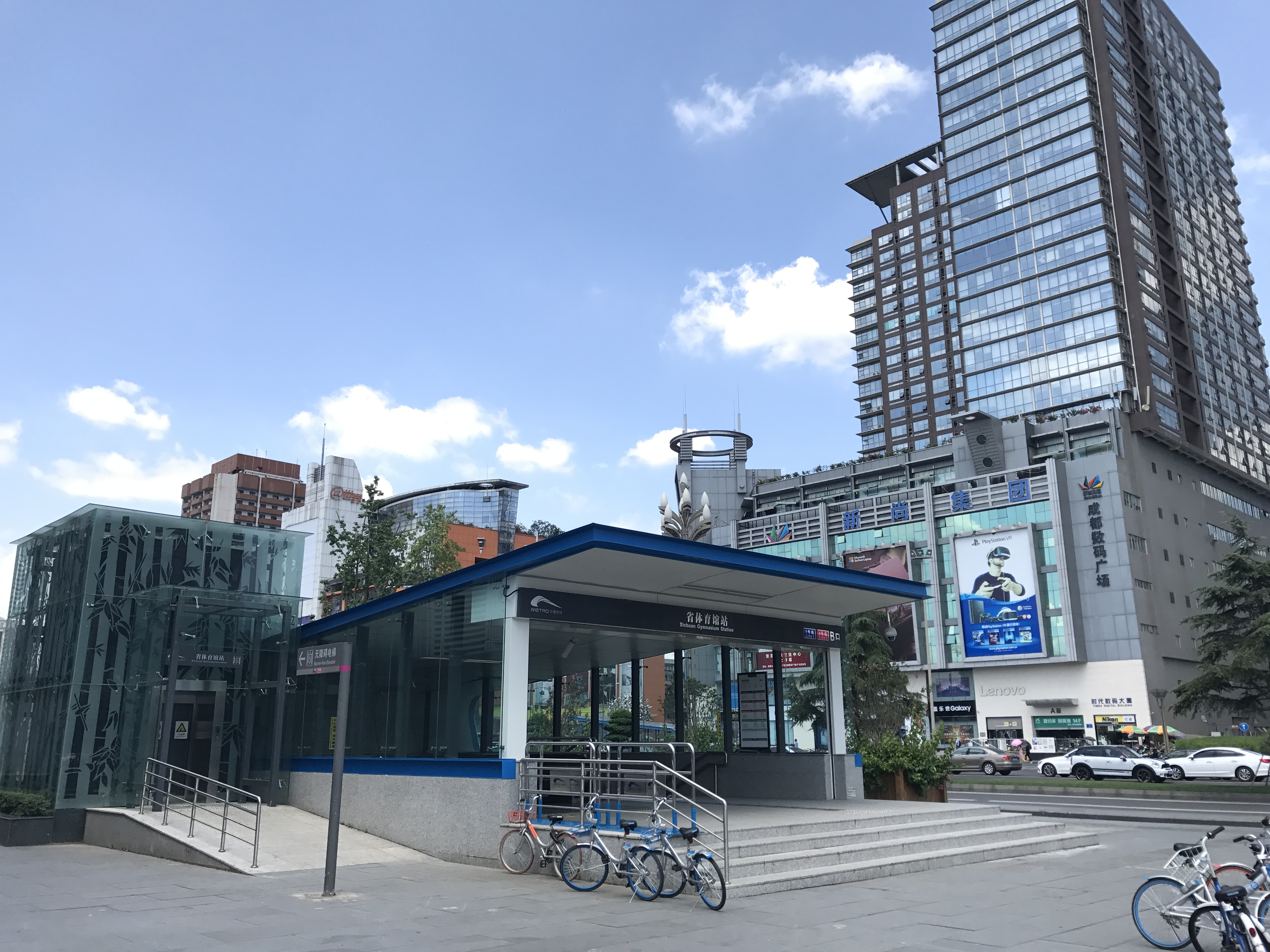
Entrance B of Sichuan Gymnasium station

| Segment | Commencement | Length | Station(s) | Name |
|---|---|---|---|---|
| Shengxian Lake — Century City | 27 September 2010 | 18.5 km (11.50 mi) | 16 | Phase 1 |
| Jincheng Plaza | 8 June 2013 | Infill station | 1 | |
| Century City — Guangdu | 25 July 2015 | 5.4 km (3.36 mi) | 5 | Phase 2 |
| Shengxian Lake — Weijianian | 18 March 2018 | 1.5 km (0.93 mi) | 1 | Phase 3 |
| Sihe — Science City | 18 March 2018 | 14.0 km (8.70 mi) | 11 | Phase 3 |
| Guangdu — Wugensong | 18 March 2018 | 1.4 km (0.87 mi) | 1 | Phase 3 |

== Stations ==
| Service routes | | Station № | Station name | | Connections | Distance km | | Location |
| Service routes | | Station № | English | Chinese | Connections | Distance km | | Location |
|---|---|---|---|---|---|---|---|---|
| ● | ● | 0101 | Weijianian | 韦家碾 | 27 S11 | | 0 | Jinniu |
| ● | ● | 0102 | Shengxian Lake | 升仙湖 | | 1.514 | 1.514 | Chenghua |
| ● | ● | 0103 | North Railway Station | 火车北站 | 7 18 CG CDW Chengdu BRT | 1.593 | 3.107 | Jinniu |
| ● | ● | 0104 | Renmin North Road | 人民北路 | 6 | 1.180 | 4.287 | Jinniu |
| ● | ● | 0105 | Wenshu Monastery | 文殊院 | | 1.351 | 5.638 | Qingyang |
| ● | ● | 0106 | Luomashi | 骡马市 | 4 10 18 | 0.884 | 6.522 | Qingyang |
| ● | ● | 0107 | Tianfu Square | 天府广场 | 2 | 1.018 | 7.540 | Qingyang |
| ● | ● | 0108 | Jinjiang Hotel | 锦江宾馆 | | 0.833 | 8.373 | Jinjiang |
| ● | ● | 0109 | Huaxiba | 华西坝 | 13 | 0.779 | 9.152 | Wuhou |
| ● | ● | 0110 | Sichuan Gymnasium | 省体育馆 | 3 18 | 1.058 | 10.210 | Wuhou |
| ● | ● | 0111 | Nijiaqiao | 倪家桥 | 8 18 | 0.961 | 11.171 | Wuhou |
| ● | ● | 0112 | Tongzilin | 桐梓林 | | 1.052 | 12.223 | Wuhou |
| ● | ● | 0113 | South Railway Station | 火车南站 | 7 18 CNW | 1.113 | 13.336 | Wuhou |
| ● | ● | 0114 | Hi-Tech Zone | 高新 | | 1.307 | 14.643 | Wuhou |
| ● | ● | 0115 | Financial City | 金融城 | | 1.296 | 15.939 | Wuhou |
| ● | ● | 0116 | Incubation Park | 孵化园 | 9 18 | 0.826 | 16.765 | Wuhou |
| ● | ● | 0117 | Jincheng Plaza | 锦城广场 | | 0.85 | 17.615 | Wuhou |
| ● | ● | 0118 | Century City | 世纪城 | 18 | 1.452 | 19.067 | Wuhou |
| ● | ● | 0119 | 3rd Tianfu Street | 天府三街 | | 0.965 | 20.032 | Wuhou |
| ● | ● | 0120 | 5th Tianfu Street | 天府五街 | | 1.011 | 21.043 | Wuhou |
| ● | ● | 0121 | Huafu Avenue | 华府大道 | | 1.261 | 22.304 | Shuangliu |
| ● | ● | 0122 | Sihe | 四河 | | 1.099 | 23.403 | Shuangliu |
| ● | ｜ | 0123 | Huayang | 华阳 | | 1.413 | 24.816 | Shuangliu |
| ● | ｜ | 0124 | Haichang Road | 海昌路 | 18 | 1.178 | 25.994 | Shuangliu |
| ● | ｜ | 0125 | Guangfu | 广福 | | 1.565 | 27.559 | Shuangliu |
| ● | ｜ | 0126 | Hongshi Park | 红石公园 | | 1.611 | 29.170 | Shuangliu |
| ● | ｜ | 0127 | Luhu Lake | 麓湖 | | 1.090 | 30.260 | Shuangliu |
| ● | ｜ | 0128 | Wuhan Road | 武汉路 | | 1.347 | 31.607 | Shuangliu |
| ● | ｜ | 0129 | Tianfu Park | 天府公园 | | 1.169 | 32.776 | Shuangliu |
| ● | ｜ | 0130 | Western China Int'l Expo City | 西博城 | 6 18 | 0.915 | 33.691 | Shuangliu |
| ● | ｜ | 0131 | Guangzhou Road | 广州路 | | 0.696 | 34.387 | Shuangliu |
| ● | ｜ | 0132 | Xinglong Lake | 兴隆湖 | | 1.475 | 35.862 | Shuangliu |
| ● | ｜ | 0133 | Science City | 科学城 | | 1.612 | 37.474 | Shuangliu |
| | ● | 01Y1 | Guangdu | 广都 | | 1.033 | 24.436 | Shuangliu |
| | ● | 01Y2 | Wugensong | 五根松 | | 1.396 | 25.832 | Shuangliu |

== Future extension ==
It was proposed in Phase 3 that line 1 should be extended to Laijiadian, or even Dafeng. However this plan is stalled due to military zone in the affected area.

== See also ==
- Urbanrail.net page on Chengdu Metro
- Photo of Jinjiang Hotel station
- Photo of Tianfu Square station
