= Wugensong station =

Station on Line 1 of the Chengdu Metro in China

Wugensong 五根松
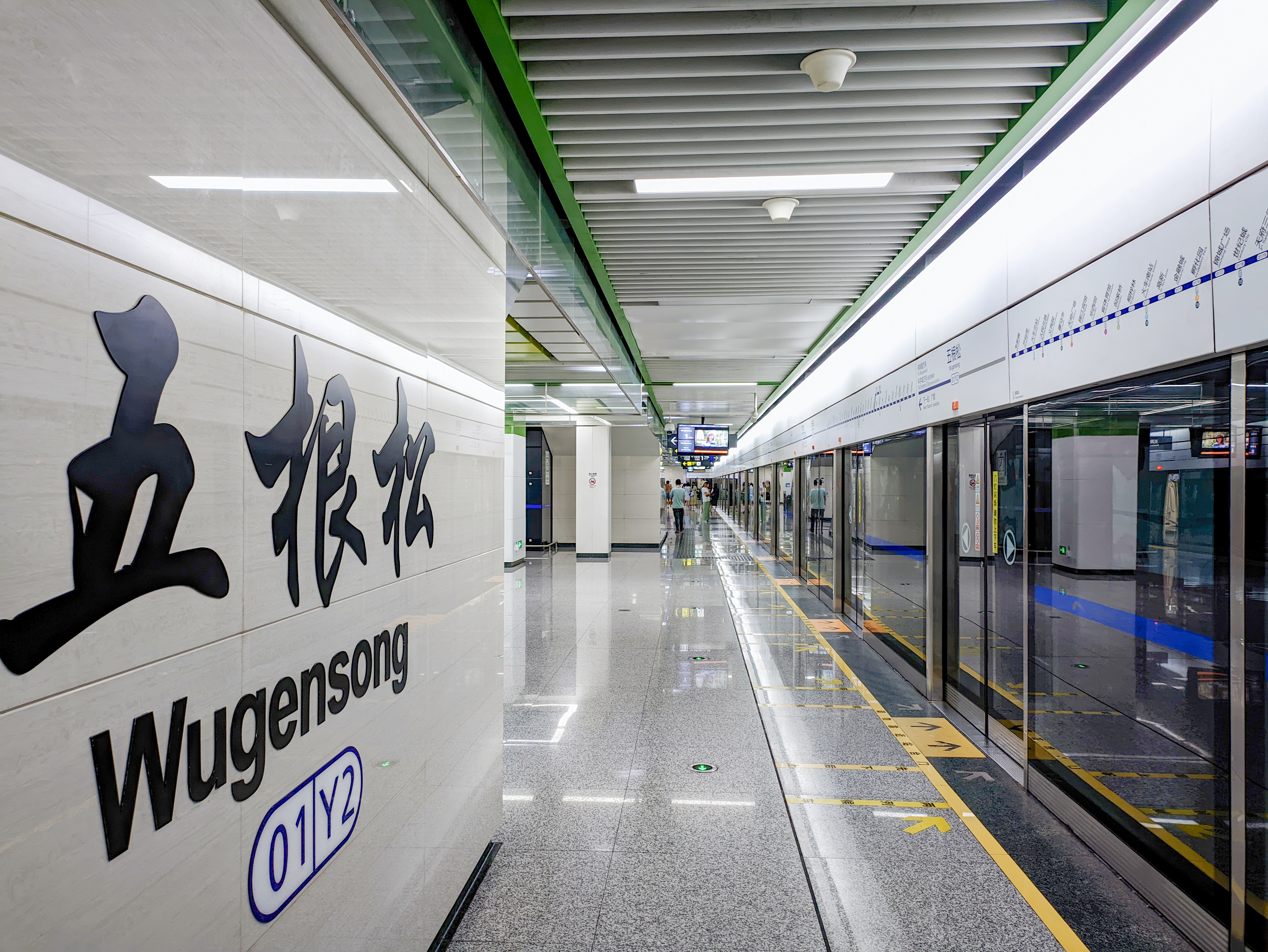
- Platform of Wugensong station

General information
- Location: Shuangliu District, Chengdu, Sichuan; China
- Operated by: Chengdu Metro Limited
- Line: Line 1
- Platforms: 2 (1 island platform)

Other information
- Station code: 01Y2

History
- Opened: 18 March 2018

Services
Preceding station	Chengdu Metro	Following station
Guangdu towards Weijianian	Line 1	Terminus
Location

Wugensong (Chinese: 五根松) is a station on Line 1 of the Chengdu Metro in China.

== Station layout ==
G	Entrances and Exits	Exits A-D
B1	Concourse	Faregates, Station Agent
B2	Northbound	← Line 1 towards Weijianian (Guangdu)
B2	Island platform, doors open on the left
B2	Southbound	Line 1 termination platform →

== Gallery ==
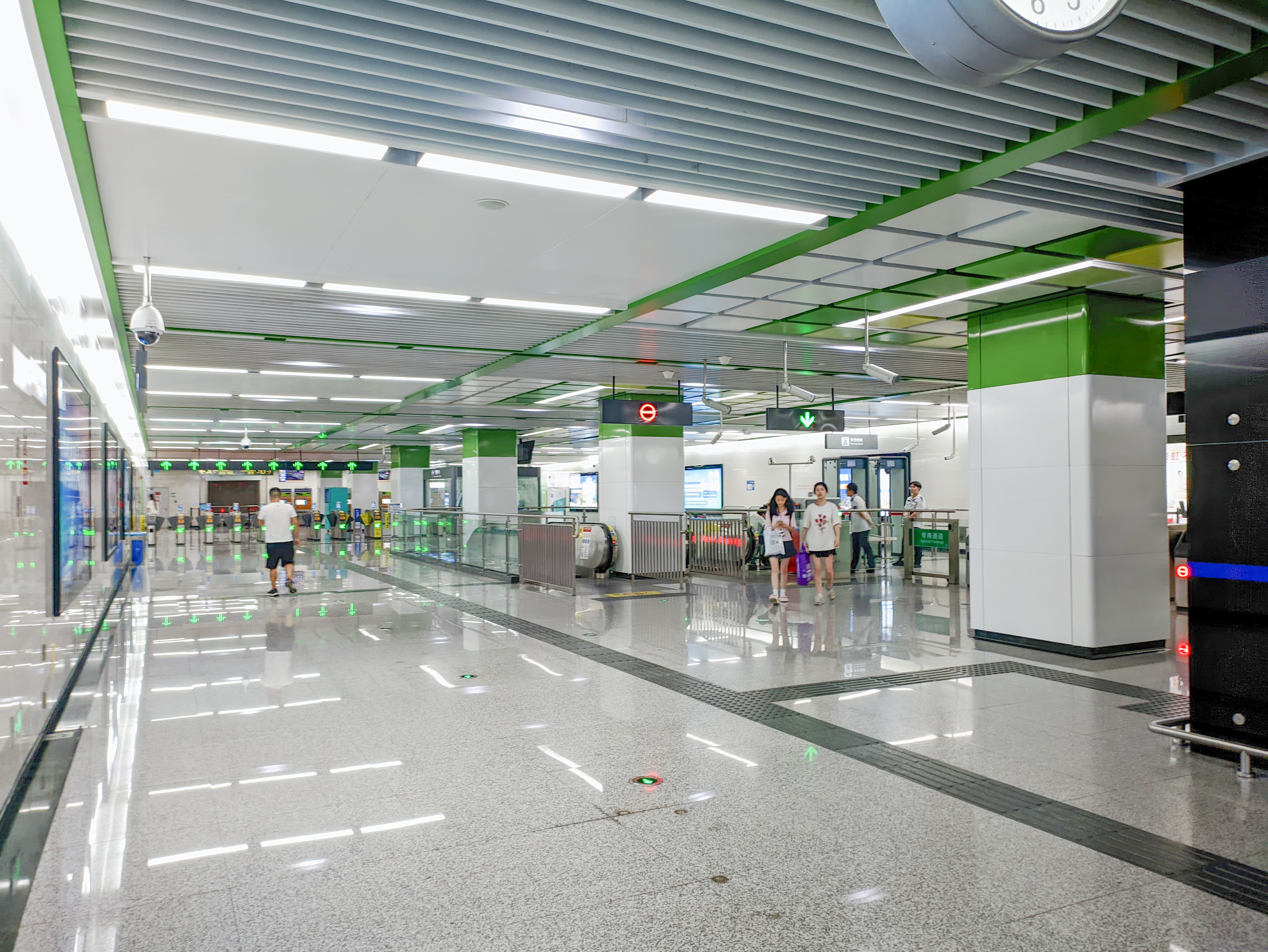
Concourse

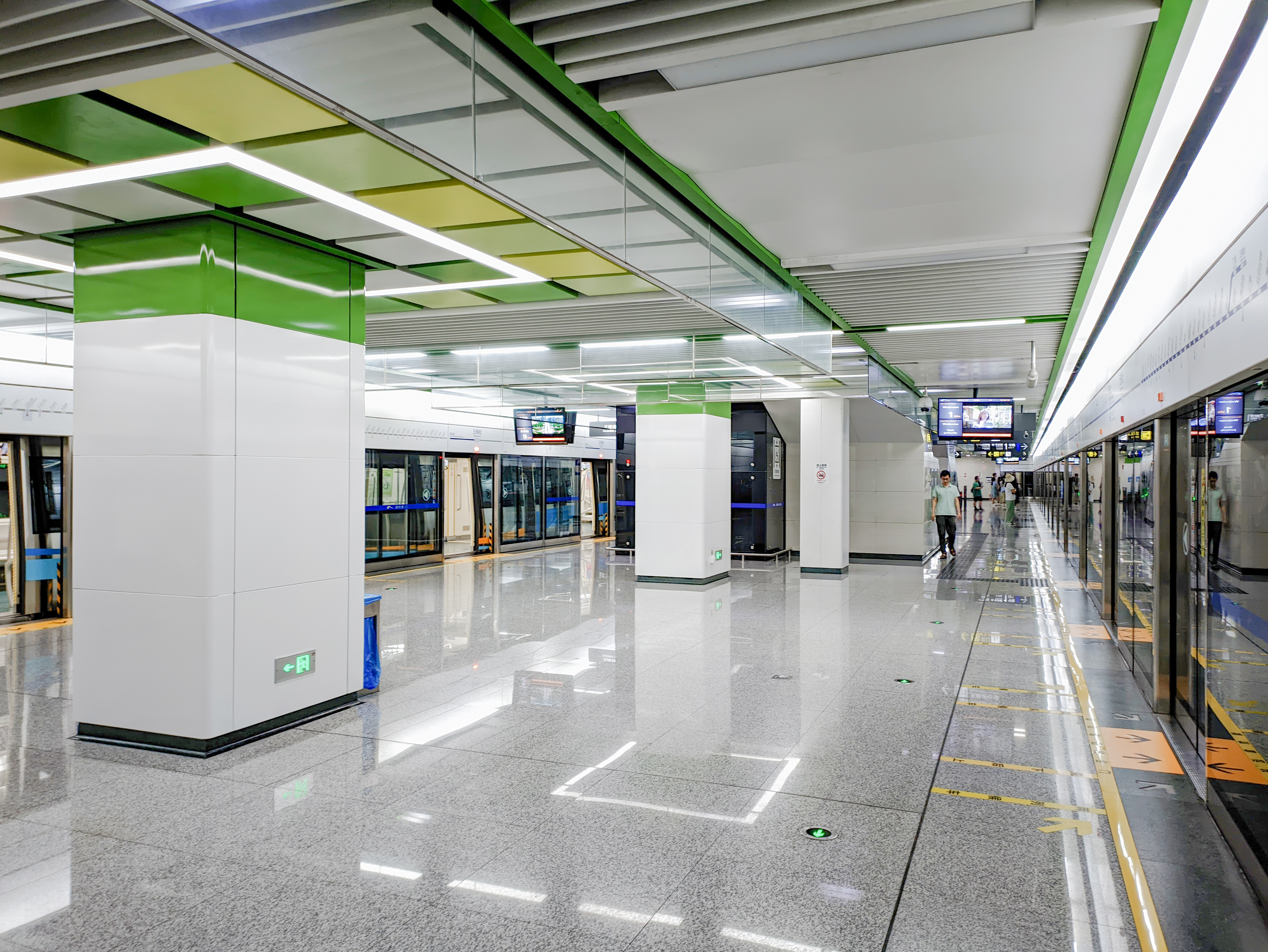
Platform
