= Weijianian station =

Metro station in Chengdu, China

Weijianian 韦家碾
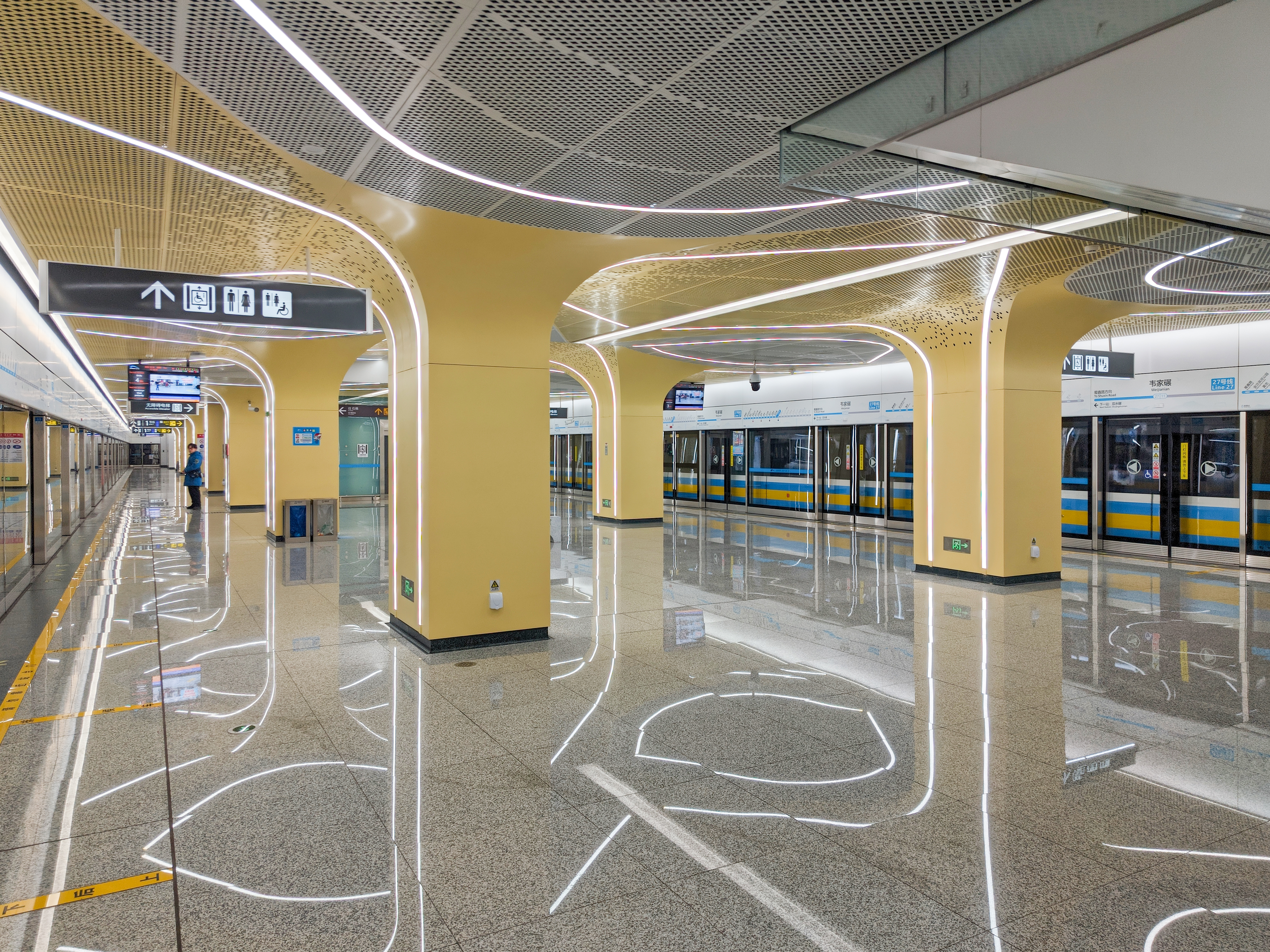
- Line 27 platform

General information
- Location: Jinniu District, Chengdu, Sichuan; China
- Coordinates: 30.7221°N 104.08759°E
- Operated by: Chengdu Metro Limited
- Line(s): Line 1 Line 27
- Platforms: 4 (1 island platform, 2 side platforms)

Other information
- Station code: 0101 2711

History
- Opened: 18 March 2018 (Line 1); 19 December 2024 (Line 27)

Services
Preceding station	Chengdu Metro	Following station
Terminus	Line 1	Shengxian Lake towards Science City or Wugensong
Laijiadian towards Shifo	Line 27	Shuangshuinian towards Shuxin Road
Location

Weijianian (Chinese: 韦家碾) is a metro station on Line 1 and Line 27 of the Chengdu Metro. It is the northern terminus of Line 1.

== Station layout ==
G	Entrances and Exits	Exits A-E, G
B1	Concourse	Faregates, Station Agent
B2	Side platform, doors open on the right
B2	Northbound	← Line 1 termination track
B2	Southbound	Line 1 towards Science City (Shengxian Lake) →
B2	Side platform, doors open on the right
B3	Northbound	← Line 27 towards Shifo (Laijiadian)
B3	Island platform, doors open on the left
B3	Southbound	Line 27 towards Shuxin Road (Shuangshuinian) →

== Gallery ==
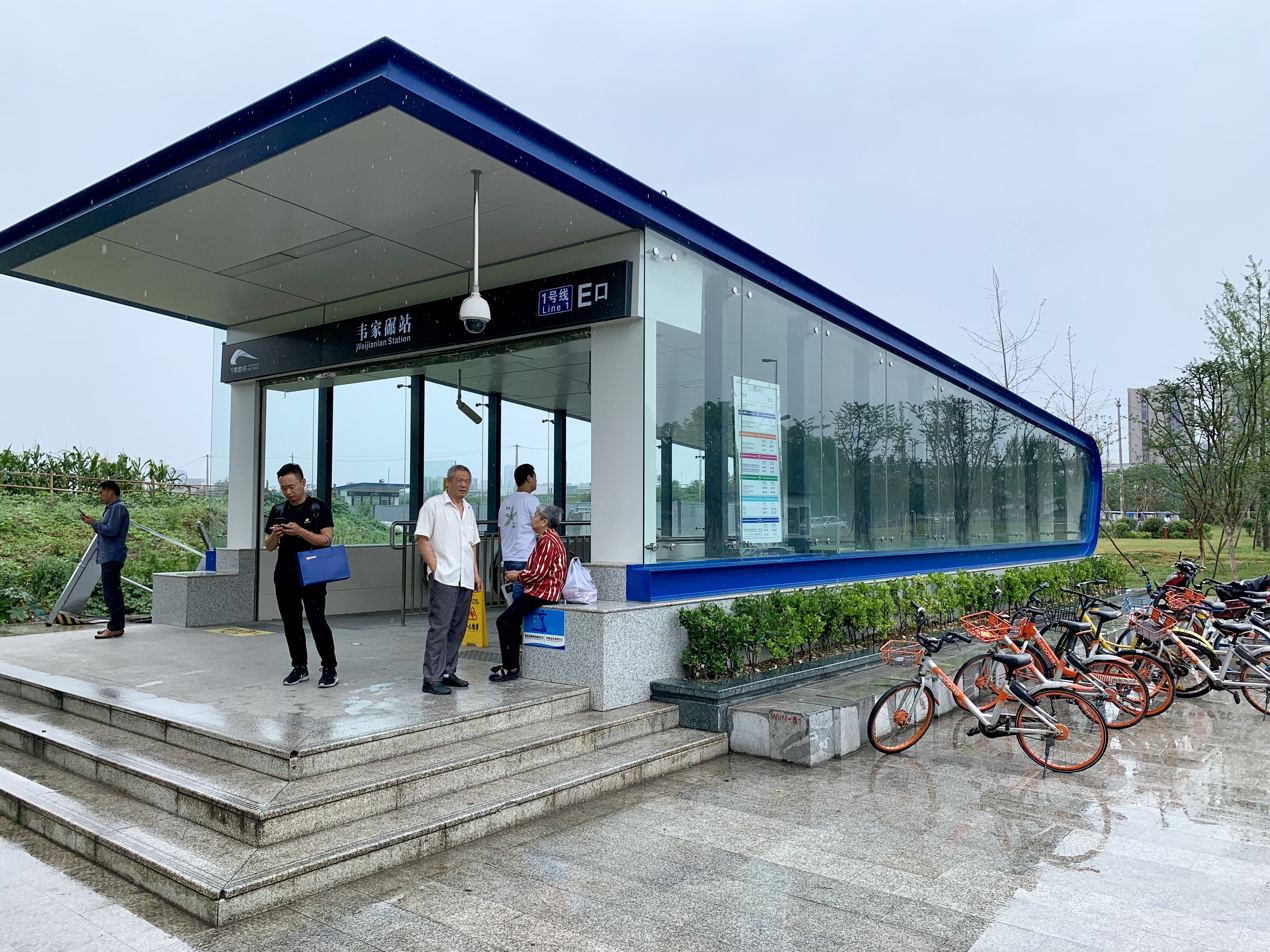
Entrance E

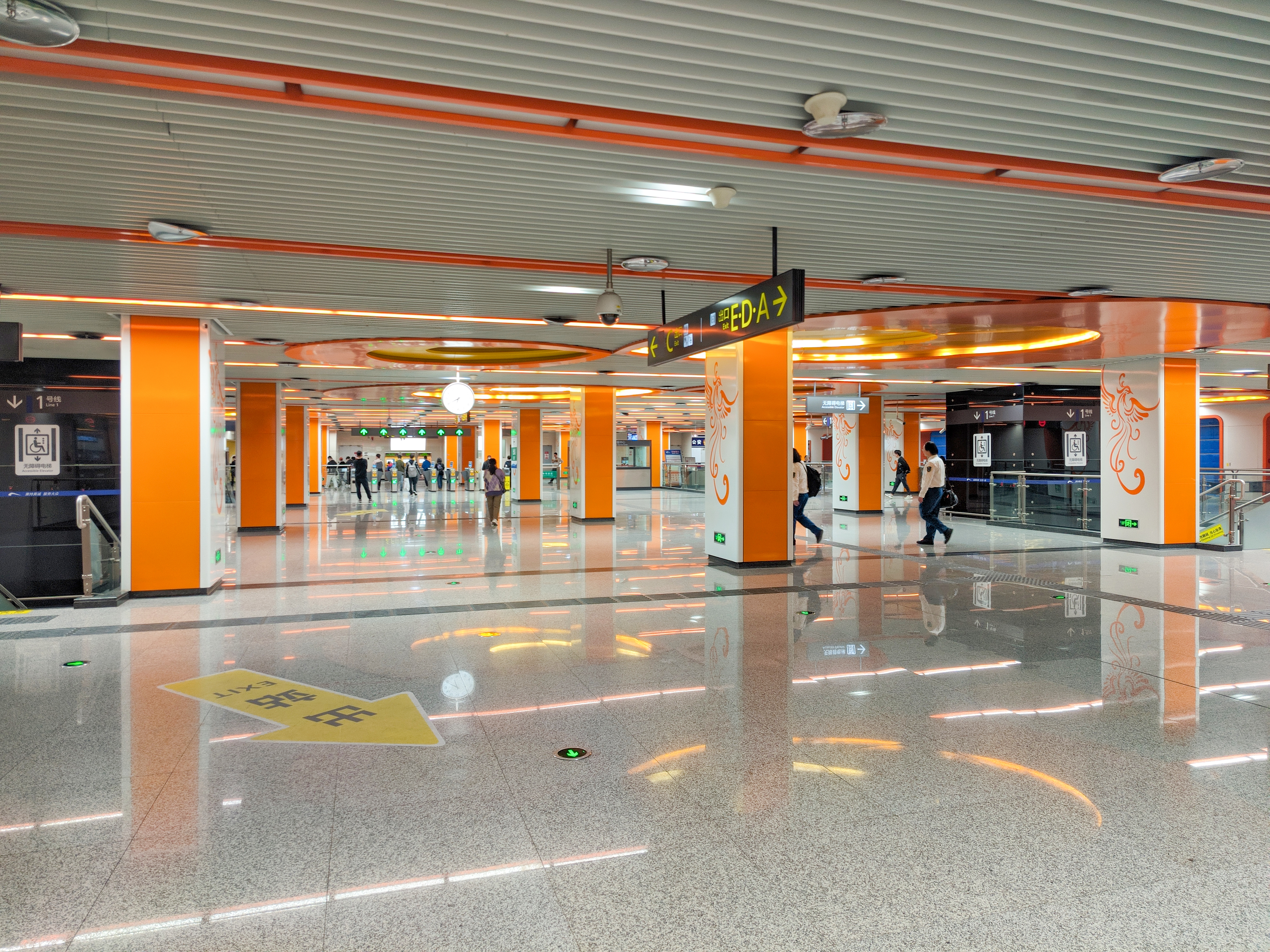
Line 1 concourse

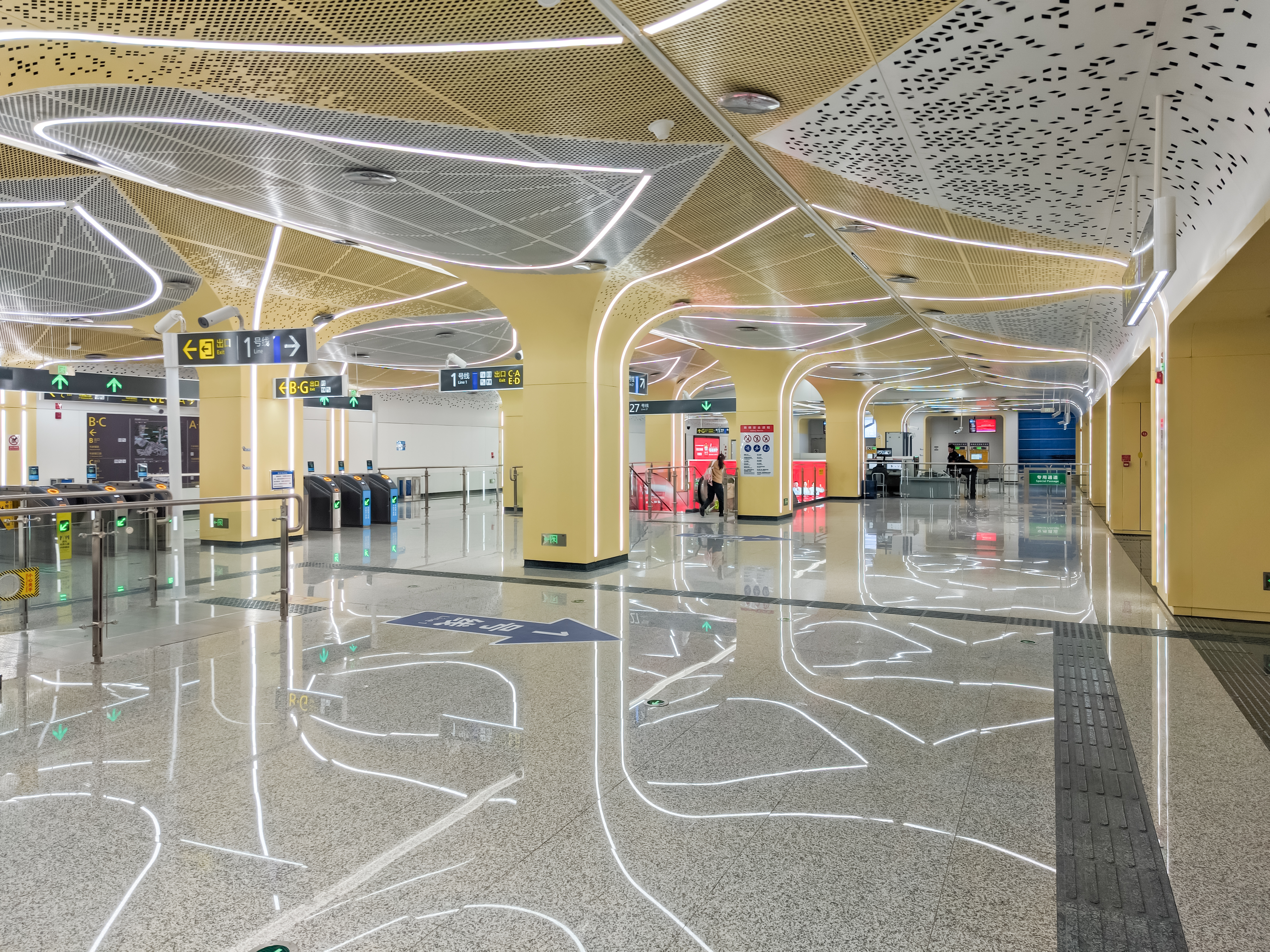
Line 27 concourse

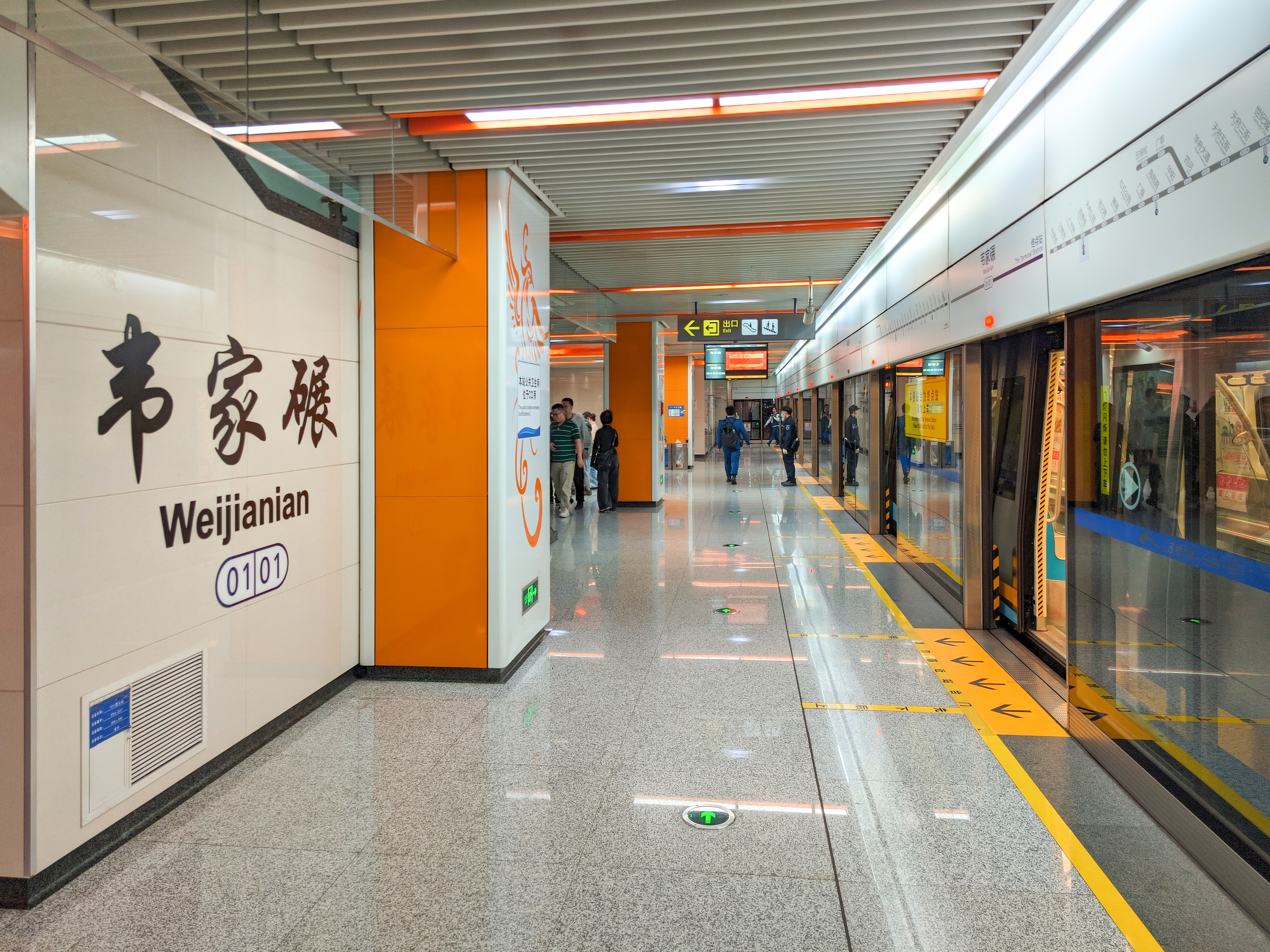
Line 1 platform (northbound)

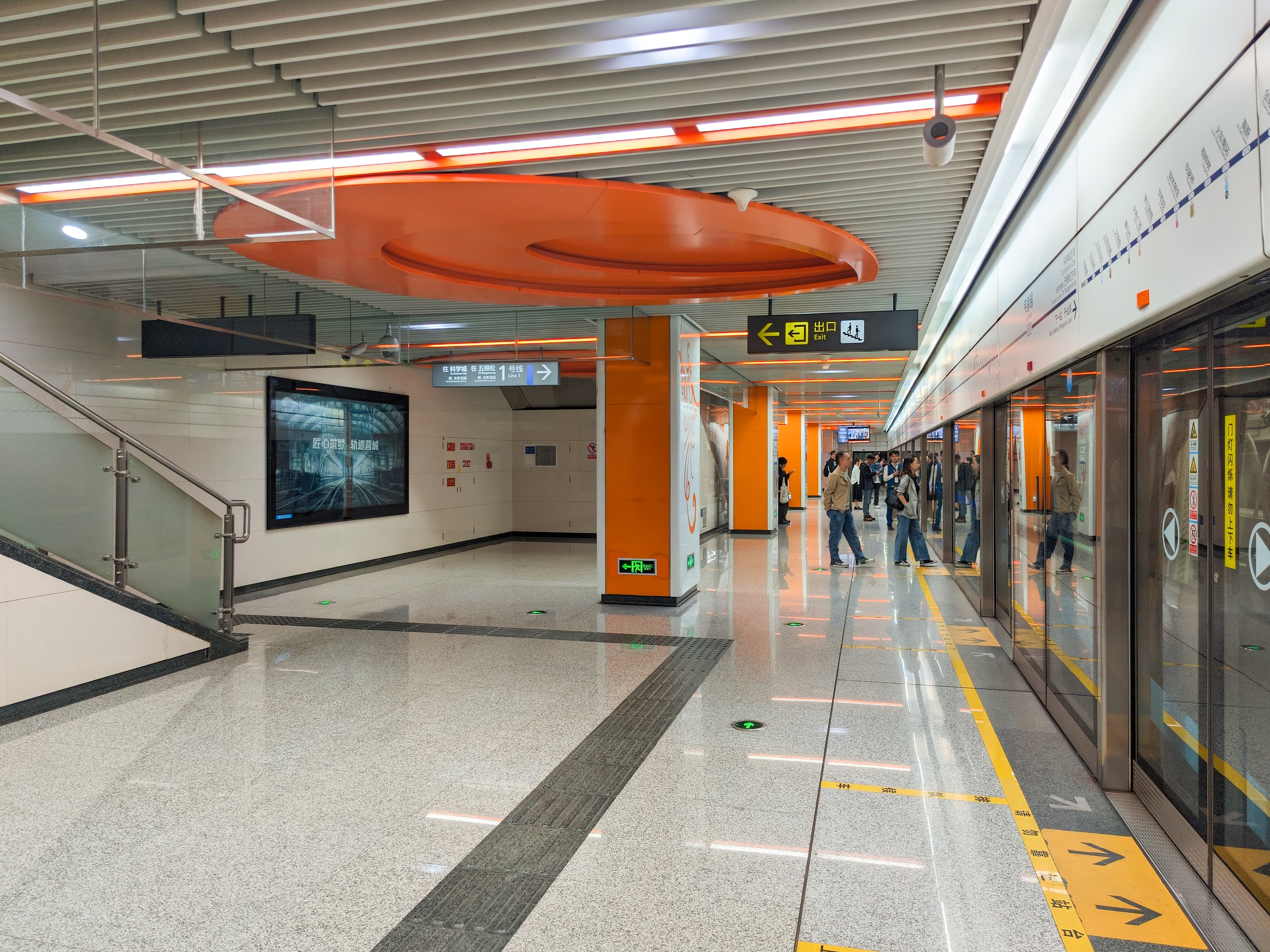
Line 1 platform (southbound)

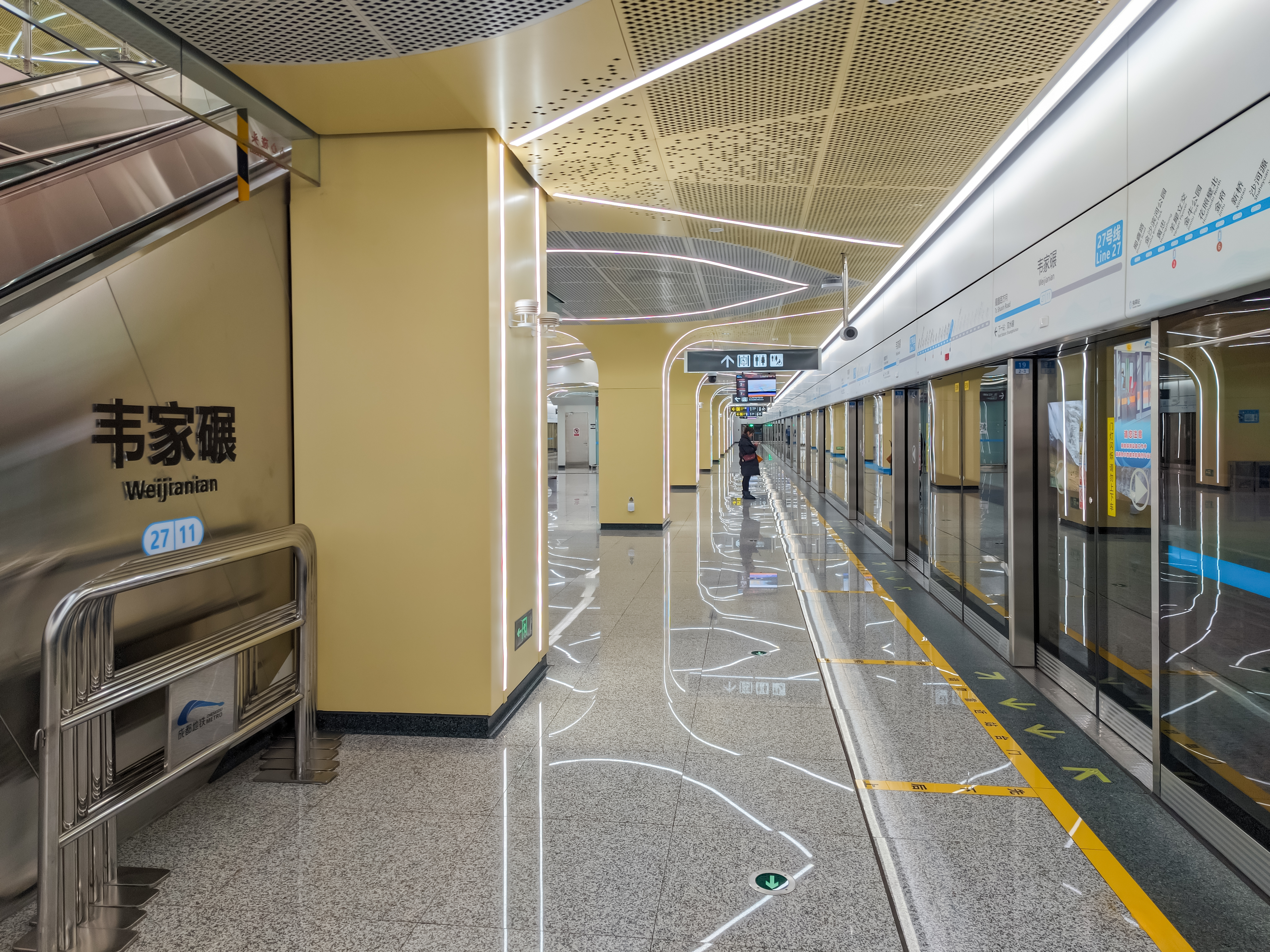
Line 27 platform
