= Pixian East railway station =

Railway station in Chengdu, China

Pixian East 郫县东

General information
- Other names: Pixiandong
- Location: Pidu District, Chengdu, Sichuan; China
- Operated by: Chengdu Railway Bureau, China Railway Corporation
- Line: Chengdu–Dujiangyan Intercity Railway
- Platforms: 2

History
- Opened: 2010
Location

The Pixiandong railway station or Pixian East railway station (Chinese: 郫县东站; pinyin: Píxiàndōng Zhàn) is a railway station on the Chengdu–Dujiangyan Intercity Railway in Pidu District, Chengdu, Sichuan, China. This station has been fully built but no trains currently stop at Pixian East.

== See also ==
- Chengdu–Dujiangyan Intercity Railway

Preceding station	China Railway High-speed	Following station
Hongguangzhen towards Chengdu	Chengdu–Dujiangyan intercity railway	Pixian towards Qingchengshan, Lidui Park or Pengzhou
