= Xipu East railway station =

Railway station in Chengdu, China

Xipu East 犀浦东

General information
- Other names: Xipudong
- Location: Pidu District, Chengdu, Sichuan; China
- Coordinates: 30.74°N 103.99°E
- Operator: Chengdu Railway Bureau, China Railway Corporation
- Line: Chengdu–Dujiangyan Intercity Railway
- Platforms: 2

History
- Former names: Jinniu
Location
- Location within Sichuan Location within China

The Xipu East railway station or Xipudong railway station (Chinese: 犀浦东站; pinyin: Xīpǔdōng Zhàn) is a railway station on the Chengdu–Dujiangyan Intercity Railway in Pidu District, Chengdu, Sichuan, China. This station has been fully built but no trains currently stop at Xipu East.

== See also ==
- Chengdu–Dujiangyan Intercity Railway

| Preceding station | China Railway High-speed | Following station |
|---|---|---|
| Anjing towards Chengdu | Chengdu–Dujiangyan intercity railway | Xipu towards Qingchengshan, Lidui Park or Pengzhou |
