= Pixian railway station =

Railway station in Chengdu, China

Pixian 郫县
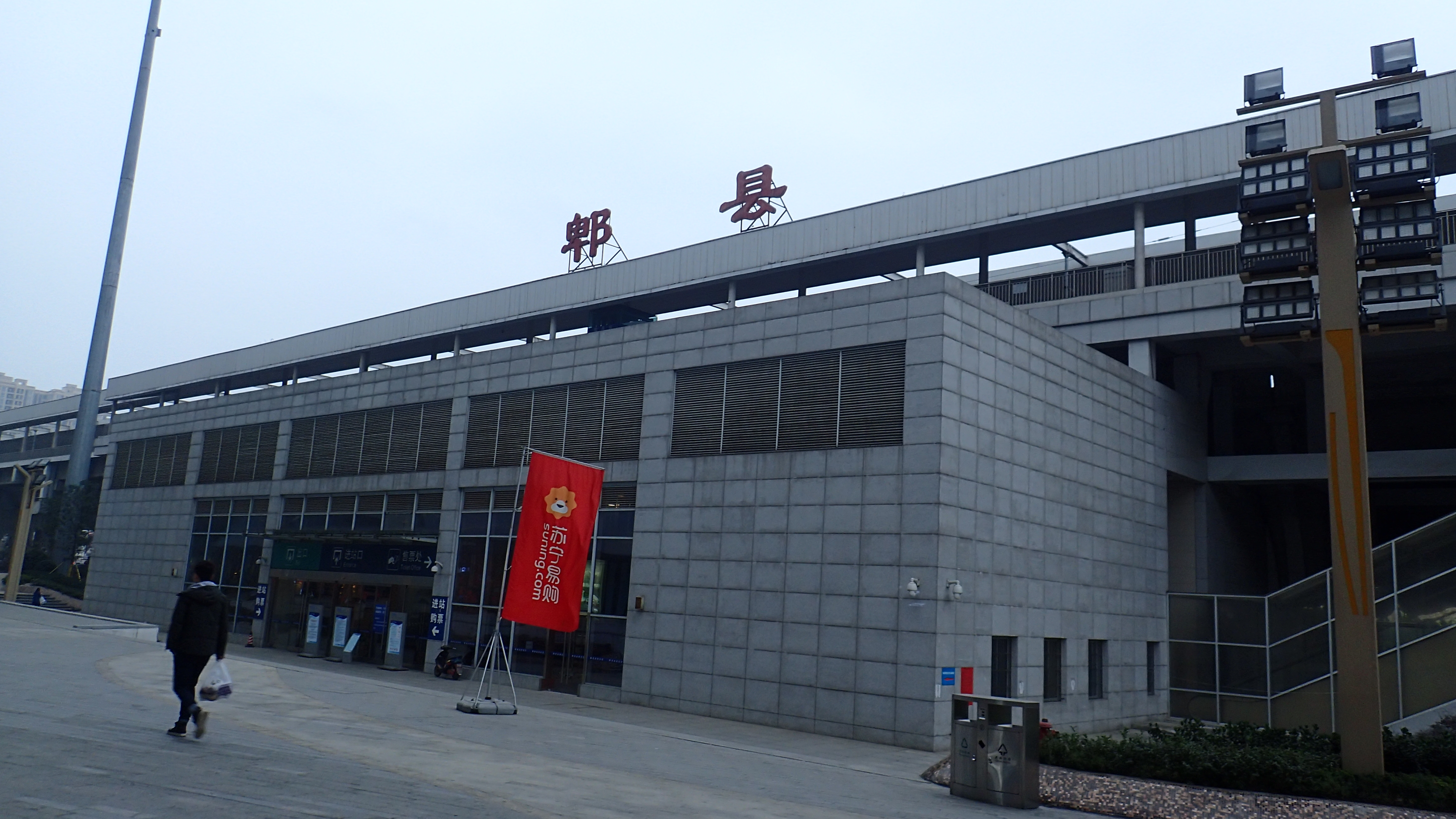

General information
- Location: Pidu District, Chengdu, Sichuan; China
- Coordinates: 30.8110°N 103.9062°E
- Operator: Chengdu Railway Bureau, China Railway Corporation
- Line: Chengdu–Dujiangyan Intercity Railway
- Platforms: 2

History
- Opened: 2010
Location

The Pixian railway station (Chinese: 郫县站; pinyin: Píxiàn Zhàn) is a railway station on the Chengdu–Dujiangyan Intercity Railway in Pidu District, Chengdu, Sichuan, China. About ten trains stop at the station daily.

== See also ==
- Chengdu–Dujiangyan Intercity Railway

| Preceding station | China Railway High-speed | Following station |
|---|---|---|
| Pixian East towards Chengdu | Chengdu–Dujiangyan intercity railway | Pixian West towards Qingchengshan, Lidui Park or Pengzhou |
