= Juyuan railway station =

Railway station in Dujiangyan, China

Coordinates: 30°56′09″N 103°41′58″E

Juyuan 聚源
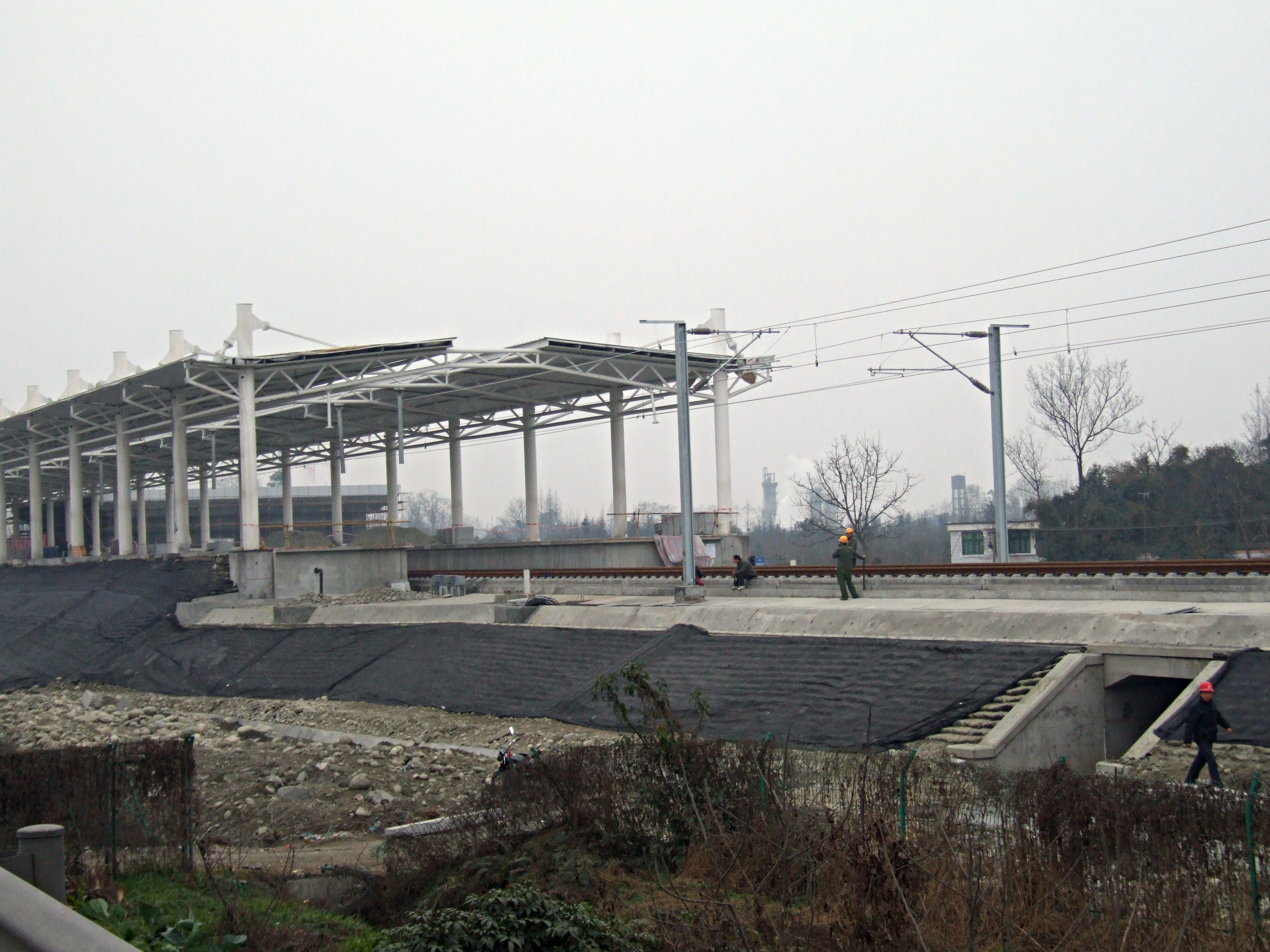

General information
- Location: Dujiangyan, Chengdu, Sichuan; China
- Operated by: Chengdu Railway Bureau, China Railway Corporation
- Line: Chengdu–Dujiangyan Intercity Railway
- Platforms: 2

History
- Opened: 2010
Location

The Juyuan railway station (Chinese: 聚源站; pinyin: Jù Yuán Zhàn) is a railway station on the Chengdu–Dujiangyan Intercity Railway in Chengdu, Sichuan, China. This station has been fully built but no trains currently stop at Juyuan.

== See also ==
- Chengdu–Dujiangyan Intercity Railway

Preceding station	China Railway High-speed	Following station
Ande towards Chengdu	Chengdu–Dujiangyan intercity railway	Dujiangyan towards Qingchengshan
Ande towards Chengdu	Chengdu–Dujiangyan intercity railway	Yingbin Road towards Lidui Park
