= Pixian West railway station =

Railway station in Chengdu, China

Pixian West 郫县西
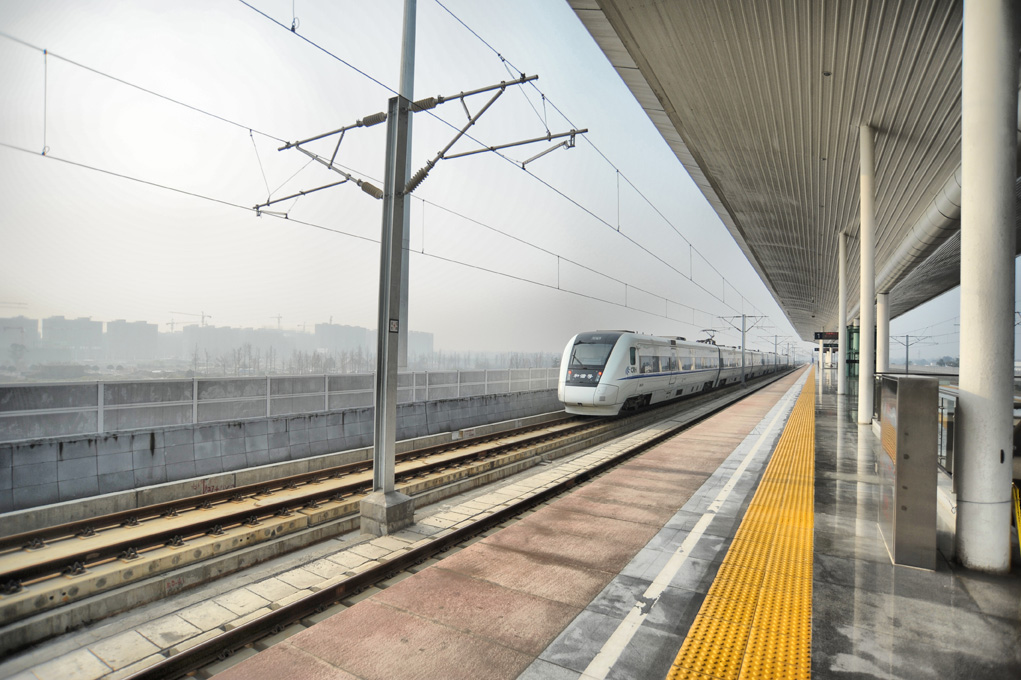

General information
- Other names: Pixianxi
- Location: Pidu District, Chengdu, Sichuan; China
- Operator: Chengdu Railway Bureau, China Railway Corporation
- Line: Chengdu–Dujiangyan Intercity Railway
- Platforms: 1

History
- Opened: 2010
Location

Pixianxi railway station or Pixian West railway station (Chinese: 郫县西站; pinyin: Píxiànxī Zhàn) is a railway station of Chengdu–Dujiangyan Intercity Railway. The station is located in Pidu District, Chengdu, Sichuan, China. It is served by the Chengdu Tram.

== Destinations and prices ==
Destinations	Chengdu	Xipu	Hongguangzhen	Dujiangyan	Qingchengshan	Yingbin Road	Lidui Park
Prices(¥)	10	5	5	10	10	10	10

== Rolling stock ==
- China Railways CRH1A

== See also ==
- Chengdu–Dujiangyan Intercity Railway

Preceding station	China Railway High-speed	Following station
Pixian towards Chengdu	Chengdu–Dujiangyan intercity railway	Ande towards Qingchengshan or Lidui Park
Pixian towards Chengdu	Chengdu–Dujiangyan intercity railway	Xinminchang towards Pengzhou
