= Yingbin Road railway station =

Railway station in Chengdu, China

Yingbin Road 迎宾路
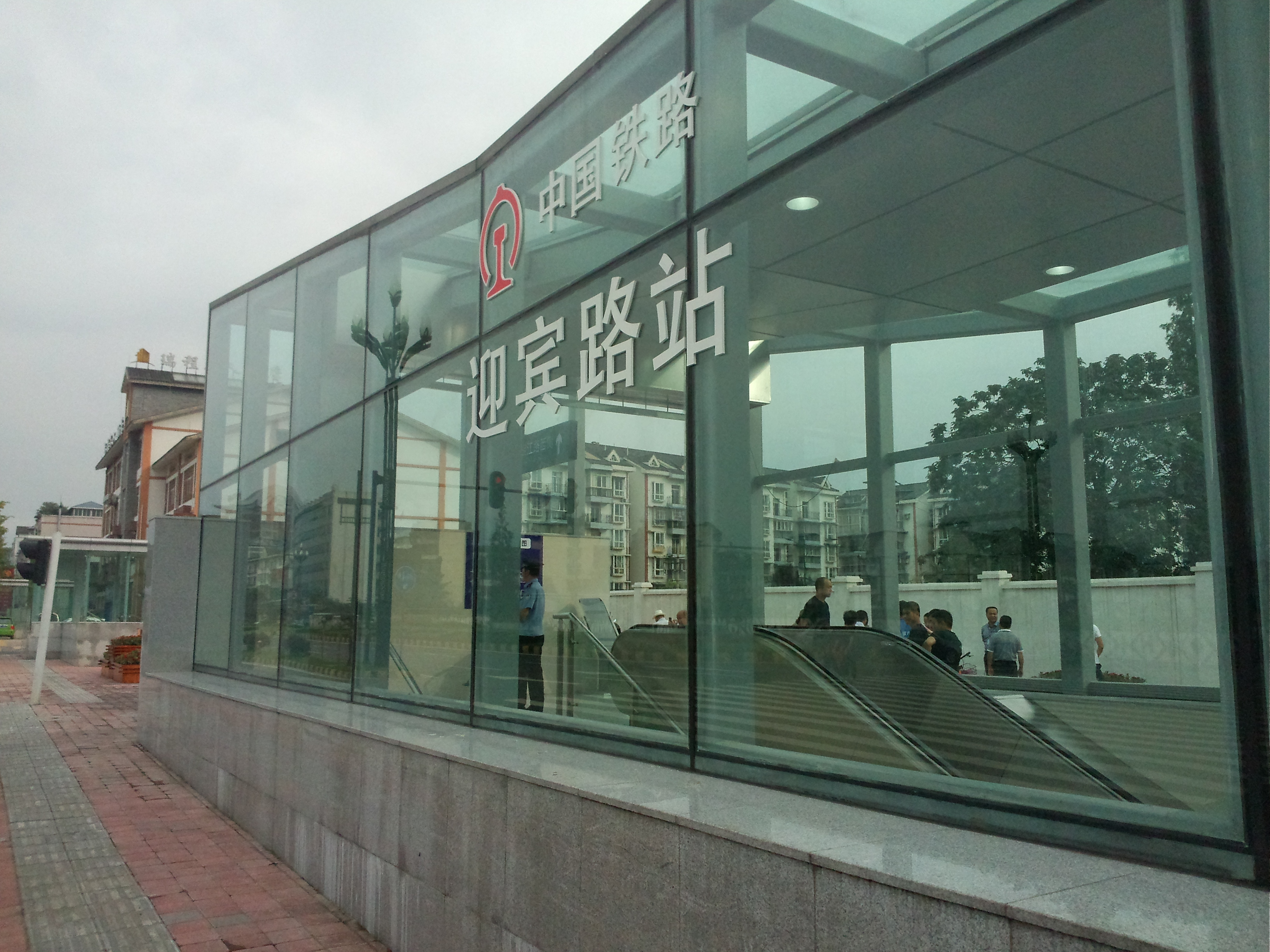

General information
- Location: Dujiangyan, Chengdu, Sichuan; China
- Operator: Chengdu Railway Bureau, China Railway Corporation
- Line: Chengdu–Dujiangyan Intercity Railway
- Platforms: 2

History
- Opened: 2013
Location

The Yingbin Road railway station (Chinese: 迎宾路站; pinyin: Yíng Bīn Lù Zhàn) is an underground railway station. The railway station is on the Lidui Branch Line of Chengdu–Dujiangyan Intercity Railway in Chengdu, Sichuan, China.

== Destinations and Prices ==
Destinations	Chengdu	Xipu	Hongguangzhen	Pixian West	Lidui Park
Prices(¥)	15	10	10	10	5

== Rolling Stock ==
- China Railways CRH1A

== See also ==
- Chengdu–Dujiangyan Intercity Railway

Preceding station	China Railway High-speed	Following station
Juyuan towards Chengdu	Chengdu–Dujiangyan intercity railway	Libing Square towards Lidui Park
