= Hongguangzhen railway station =

Railway station in Chengdu, China

Hongguangzhen 红光镇
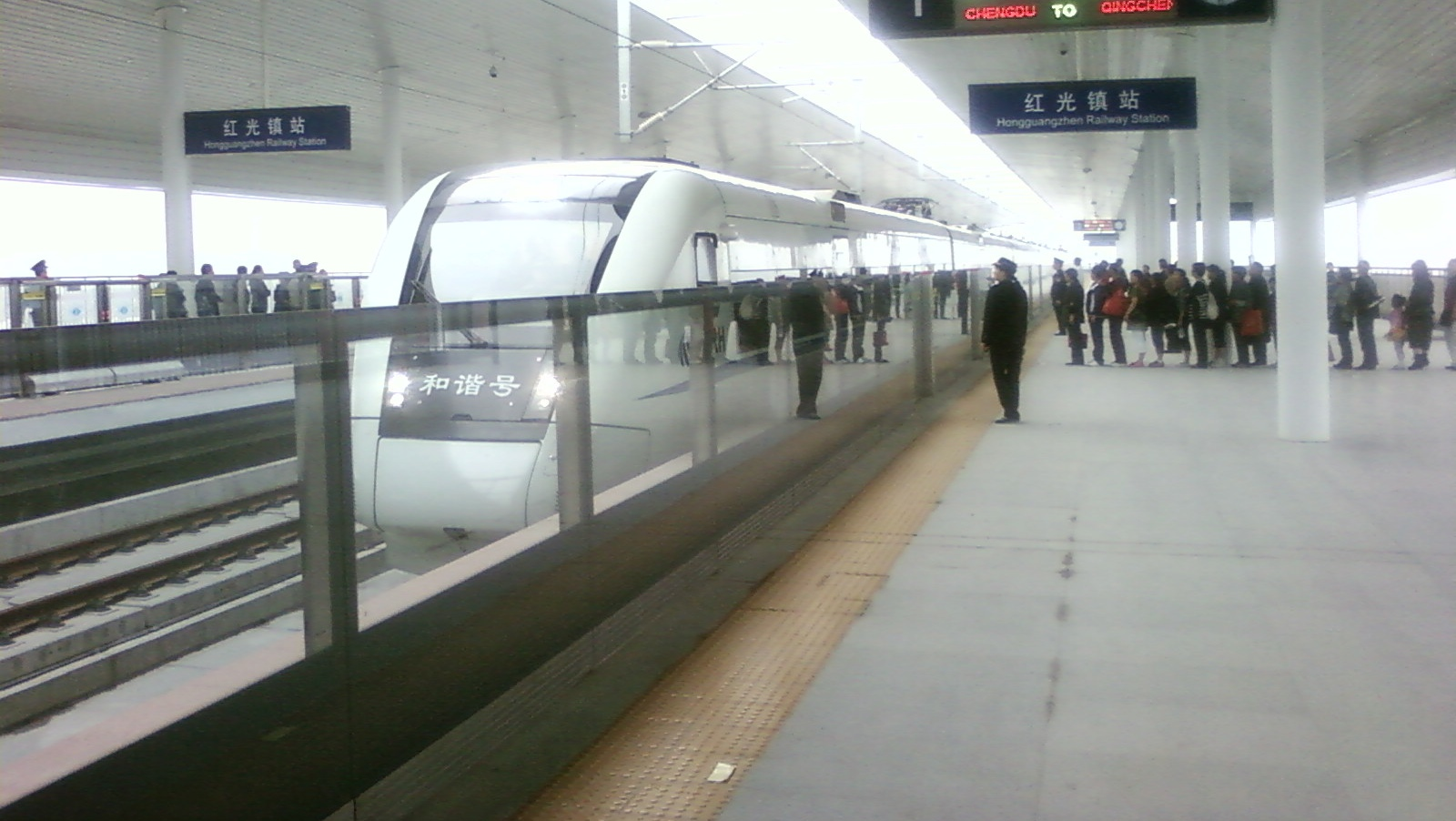

General information
- Location: Pidu District, Chengdu, Sichuan; China
- Coordinates: 30.7742°N 103.9417°E
- Operator: Chengdu Railway Bureau, China Railway Corporation
- Line: Chengdu–Dujiangyan Intercity Railway
- Platforms: 2

History
- Opened: 2010

Services
Preceding station	China Railway High-speed	Following station
Xipu towards Chengdu	Chengdu–Dujiangyan intercity railway	Pixian East towards Qingchengshan, Lidui Park or Pengzhou
Location

The Hongguangzhen railway station (Chinese: 红光镇; pinyin: Hóngguāngzhèn Zhàn) is a railway station of Chengdu–Dujiangyan Intercity Railway. The station located in Pidu District, Chengdu, Sichuan, China.

== Destinations ==
Trains depart this station bound for:

- Chengdu
- Xipu
- Pixian West
- Dujiangyan
- Qingchengshan
- Yingbin Road
- Lidui Park

== Rolling stock ==
- China Railways CRH1A

== See also ==
- Chengdu–Dujiangyan Intercity Railway
