= Dujiangyan railway station =

Railway station in Dujiangyan, China

Dujiangyan 都江堰
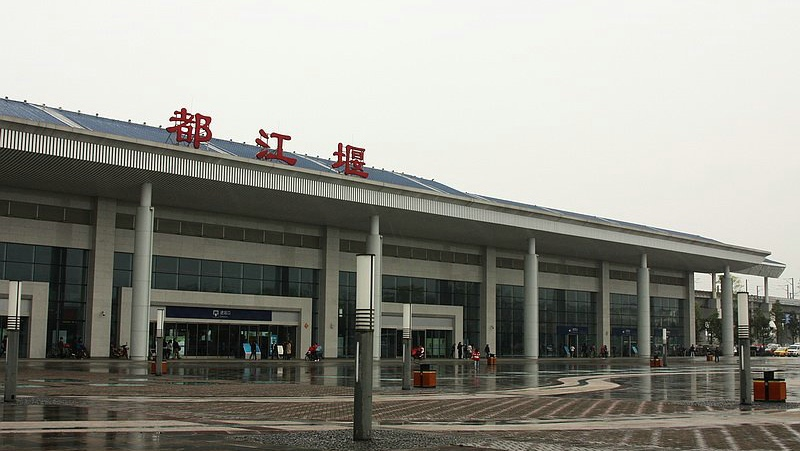

General information
- Location: Guankou, Dujiangyan, Chengdu, Sichuan; China
- Coordinates: 30.9593°N 103.6366°E
- Operated by: Chengdu Railway Bureau, China Railway Corporation
- Line: Chengdu–Dujiangyan Intercity Railway
- Platforms: 2

History
- Opened: 2010
Location

The Dujiangyan railway station (Chinese: 都江堰站; pinyin: Dūjiāngyàn Zhàn) is a railway station of Chengdu–Dujiangyan Intercity Railway. The station located in Guankou, Dujiangyan, Chengdu, Sichuan, China.

== Destinations and Prices ==
Destinations	Chengdu	Xipu	Hongguangzhen	Pixian West	Qingchengshan
Prices(¥)	15	10	10	10	5

== Rolling Stock ==
China Railways CRH1A

== See also ==
- Chengdu–Dujiangyan High-Speed Railway

Preceding station	China Railway High-speed	Following station
Juyuan towards Chengdu	Chengdu–Dujiangyan intercity railway	Qingchengshan Terminus
