= Libing Square railway station =

Railway station in Chengdu, China

Libing Square 李冰广场站

General information
- Location: Dujiangyan, Chengdu, Sichuan; China
- Operated by: Chengdu Railway Bureau, China Railway Corporation
- Line: Chengdu–Dujiangyan Intercity Railway
- Platforms: 2
Location

The Libing Square railway station (Chinese: 李冰广场站; pinyin: Lǐ Bīng Guǎng Chǎng Zhàn) is an underground railway station. The railway station is on the Lidui Branch Line of Chengdu–Dujiangyan Intercity Railway in Chengdu, Sichuan, China. This station has been fully built but no trains currently stop at Libing Square.

== See also ==
- Chengdu–Dujiangyan Intercity Railway

| Preceding station | China Railway High-speed | Following station |
|---|---|---|
| Yingbin Road towards Chengdu | Chengdu–Dujiangyan intercity railway | Lidui Park Terminus |
