= Chongyi railway station =

Railway station in Chengdu, China

Chongyi 崇义

General information
- Location: Dujiangyan, Chengdu, Sichuan; China
- Operated by: Chengdu Railway Bureau, China Railway Corporation
- Line: Chengdu–Dujiangyan Intercity Railway

The Chongyi railway station (Chinese: 崇义站; pinyin: Chóng Yì Zhàn) is a planned railway station of Chengdu–Dujiangyan Intercity Railway. This station will be located in Chengdu, Sichuan, China.

== See also ==
- Chengdu–Dujiangyan Intercity Railway
