= Line 2 (Chengdu Tram) =

Tram line in Chengdu, China

Chengdu Tram Line 2

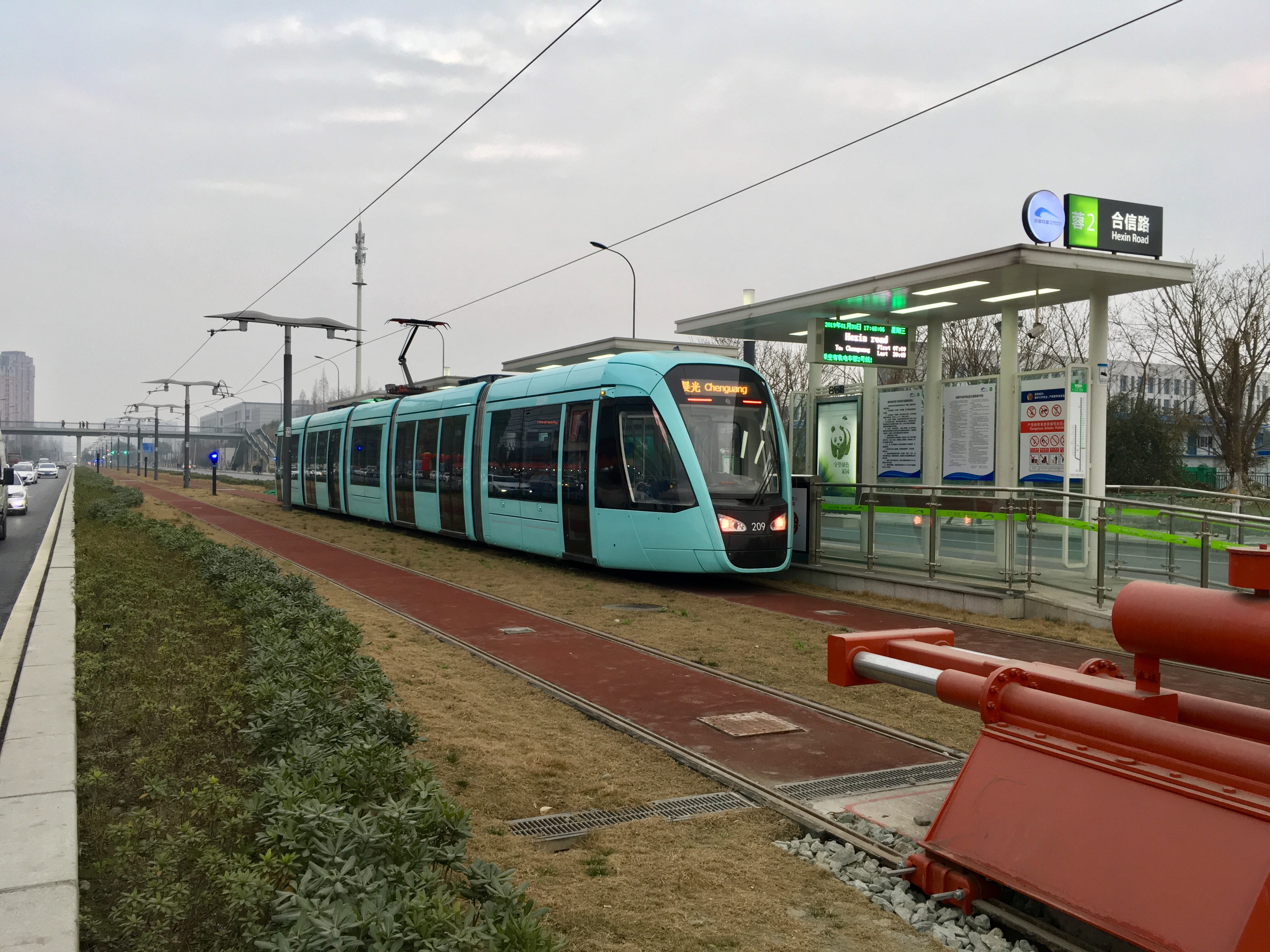

Overview
- Native name: 成都有轨电车蓉2号线
- Locale: Chengdu, China
- Stations: 35

Service
- Type: Tram
- Services: 1 (main & branch)
- Rolling stock: Alstom Citadis 302

History
- Opened: 26 December 2018; 7 years ago

Technical
- Line length: 39.3 km (24.4 mi)
- Track gauge: 1,435 mm (4 ft 8 1/2 in) standard gauge
- Electrification: 750 V DC Overhead line

Chengdu Tram Line 2 is a tram line in Chengdu, China. The line has a total length of 39.3 kilometres (24.4 mi) and 35 stations (and will have 47 in the long term). It has a 'Y' layout and runs from the Chengdu West railway station to Pixian West railway station and Hongguang. The line was officially started in December 2015, and the 13.7 km (8.5 mi) demonstration section of the line was opened on 26 December 2018, and the remaining sections were opened on 27 December 2019.

== History ==
In 2014, Chengdu disclosed the concept of building a modern tram system in the first and second round of rail transit planning. The construction concept of Chengdu Modern Tram System was disclosed in 2014. In September 2015, Chengdu Development and Reform Commission formally issued an agreement to Chengdu IT Avenue Modern Tram with the document "Chengfa Reform Government Approval [2015] No. 216". Route 2 line approval, the same month, the Chengdu Municipal government announced the "urban rail transit network construction to speed up the implementation of the program."

The line started the preliminary construction in December 2015. On 15 April 2016, the proposed naming of the 47 stations on the Chengdu route 2 entered the publicity stage and was approved by the Chengdu Municipal Government in July of the same year. In September 2016, the entire line started construction and the line demonstration site Baiye Road Station was completed in December. In June 2017, Chengdu CRRC Long Passenger Rail Vehicle Company announced the low-floor tram vehicles used on the line. On 25 September of the same year, the first section of the line achieved long-track rail connection, and it was announced that it would open in the first half of 2018.

On 25 January 2018, the first section of the line was energized by the contact network; on August 10, the line completed the "hot slip" test; on September 6, the line was handed over to the operating unit; on September 10, the line started the EMU commissioning work; At the beginning of December, the installation of traffic safety signs for the first opening section was completed. On 26 December 2018, the first section opened for trial operation. On 26 December 2019, the non-initial segment opened.

== Timeline ==
- 2014 - Construction of a tram network was decided.
- 2016 - Officially construction was started.
- 2018 - Commercial service was opened in 26 December.
- 2019 - Pixian West Railway Station - Chenguang, Hexin Road - Chengdu West Railway Station and branch route opened in 27 December.

== Tram route ==
- T2 - Chengdu West railway station to Pixian West railway station via Xinye Road
- T2 branch - Xinye Road to Renhe

Station No.	Service routes			Station name		Transfer	Distance km				District
Station No.	Main		Branch	English	Chinese	Transfer	Main		Branch		District
92 33	●	●		Chengdu West Railway Station	成都西站	CMW; 4 9	-	0	-		Qingyang
92 32	●	●		Liangong	联工		1.188	1.188	-		Qingyang
92 31	｜	｜		Qingchun	清淳		0.848	2.036	-		Jinniu
92 30	｜	｜		Lianghe Road	两河路		0.547	2.583	-		Jinniu
92 29	●	●		Tulong Road	土龙路		1.014	3.597	-		Jinniu
92 28	●	●	●	Xinye Road	新业路		1.546	5.143	-	0	Pidu (W. Hi-Tech Zone)
92 27	●	●	｜	Jincheng College, Sichuan University	锦城学院		1.654	6.797	-		Pidu (W. Hi-Tech Zone)
92 26	｜	｜	｜	Xinda Road	新达路		-	-	-		Pidu (W. Hi-Tech Zone)
92 25	●	●	｜	University of Electronic Science and Technology of China	电子科大		1.604	8.601	-		Pidu (W. Hi-Tech Zone)
92 24	｜	｜	｜	Tianrun Road	天润路		1.455	10.056	-		Pidu (W. Hi-Tech Zone)
92 23	●	●	｜	Hexin Road	合信路		0.508	10.564	-		Pidu (W. Hi-Tech Zone)
92 22	●	●	｜	Hezuo Road	合作路		0.427	10.991	-		Pidu (W. Hi-Tech Zone)
92 21	●	●	｜	Tianxin Road	天欣路		0.668	11.658	-		Pidu (W. Hi-Tech Zone)
92 20	●	●	｜	Anbu	安埠		0.949	12.607	-		Pidu (W. Hi-Tech Zone)
92 19	●	●	｜	Tianying Road	天映路		1.370	13.977	-		Pidu (W. Hi-Tech Zone)
92 18	●	●	｜	Tianyuan Road	天源路		1.136	15.113	-		Pidu (W. Hi-Tech Zone)
92 17	｜	｜	｜	Shuxin Avenue	蜀新大道		-	-	-		Pidu (W. Hi-Tech Zone)
92 16	｜	｜	｜	4th Kangqiang Road	康强四路		-	-	-		Pidu (W. Hi-Tech Zone)
92 15	｜	｜	｜	2nd Antai Road	安泰二路		-	-	-		Pidu (W. Hi-Tech Zone)
92 14	｜	｜	｜	5th Antai Road	安泰五路		-	-	-		Pidu (W. Hi-Tech Zone)
92 13	●	●	｜	Defu Avenue	德富大道		4.809	19.923	-		Pidu
92 12	●	●	｜	Hongqi Avenue	红旗大道		0.760	20.683	-		Pidu
92 11	●	●	｜	Hongzhan East Road	红展东路		0.398	21.081	-		Pidu
92 10	●		｜	Dayu East Road	大禹东路		1.040	22.121	-		Pidu
92 09	●		｜	Huashi	花石		0.788	22.909	-		Pidu
92 08	●		｜	Chenguang	晨光		1.126	24.035	-		Pidu
92 07	●		｜	Hegong Road	何公路		0.829	24.864	-		Pidu
92 06	｜		｜	Wangcong Middle Road	望丛中路		0.299	25.163	-		Pidu
92 05	●		｜	Wangcong Temple	望丛祠	6	0.463	25.626	-		Pidu
92 04	｜		｜	Hexing Street	和兴街		0.632	26.258	-		Pidu
92 03	●		｜	Liyuan Road	梨园路		0.474	26.732	-		Pidu
92 02	｜		｜	Boluotan	菠萝滩		0.617	27.349	-		Pidu
92 01	●		｜	Pixian West Railway Station	郫县西站	PCW	0.469	27.818	-		Pidu
92 Y1			●	Baiye Road	百叶路		-		1.115	1.115	Pidu (W. Hi-Tech Zone)
92 Y2			●	Chenfeng	晨风		-		1.229	2.344	Pidu (W. Hi-Tech Zone)
92 Y3			●	Tianhe Road	天河路	2	-		0.672	3.016	Pidu
92 Y4			｜	Xi'an Road	犀安路		-		0.673	3.689	Pidu
92 Y5			●	Longyin	龙吟		-		0.675	4.364	Pidu
92 Y6			●	Xipu Campus, Southwest Jiaotong University	交大犀浦校区	6 (via Xingye North Street)	-		0.833	5.197	Pidu
92 Y7			●	Xifang Road	犀方路		-		0.911	6.108	Pidu
92 Y8			●	Guoning	国宁		-		1.009	7.117	Pidu
92 Y9			●	Datian	大田		-		1.137	8.254	Pidu
92 Y10			●	Xihua University	西华大学		-		0.613	8.867	Pidu
92 Y11			●	Shuanglin Village	双林村		-		0.761	9.628	Pidu
92 Y12			●	Jintu	金土		-		0.589	10.217	Pidu
92 Y13			●	Chengdu Technicians College	技师学院		-		0.903	11.120	Pidu
92 Y14			●	Renhe	仁和		-		0.698	11.818	Pidu

== Practical Info ==
- Total length - 39.3 km (24.4 mi).
- Opened - 26 Dec. 2018 (initial); 27 Dec. 2019 (full)
- Number of Stops - 35
- Number of routes - 2
- Gauge - Standard Gauge

The main line of Chengdu Tram Line T2 runs from 07:00-20:40 (to Chengdu West railway station) / 07:00-21:00 (to Pixian West railway station), and the branch line runs from 07:00-20:50 (to Xinye Road) / 07:00-21:30 (toward Chenguang), the departure interval is about 10 minutes, and the whole journey takes about 40 minutes.

== Fleet ==
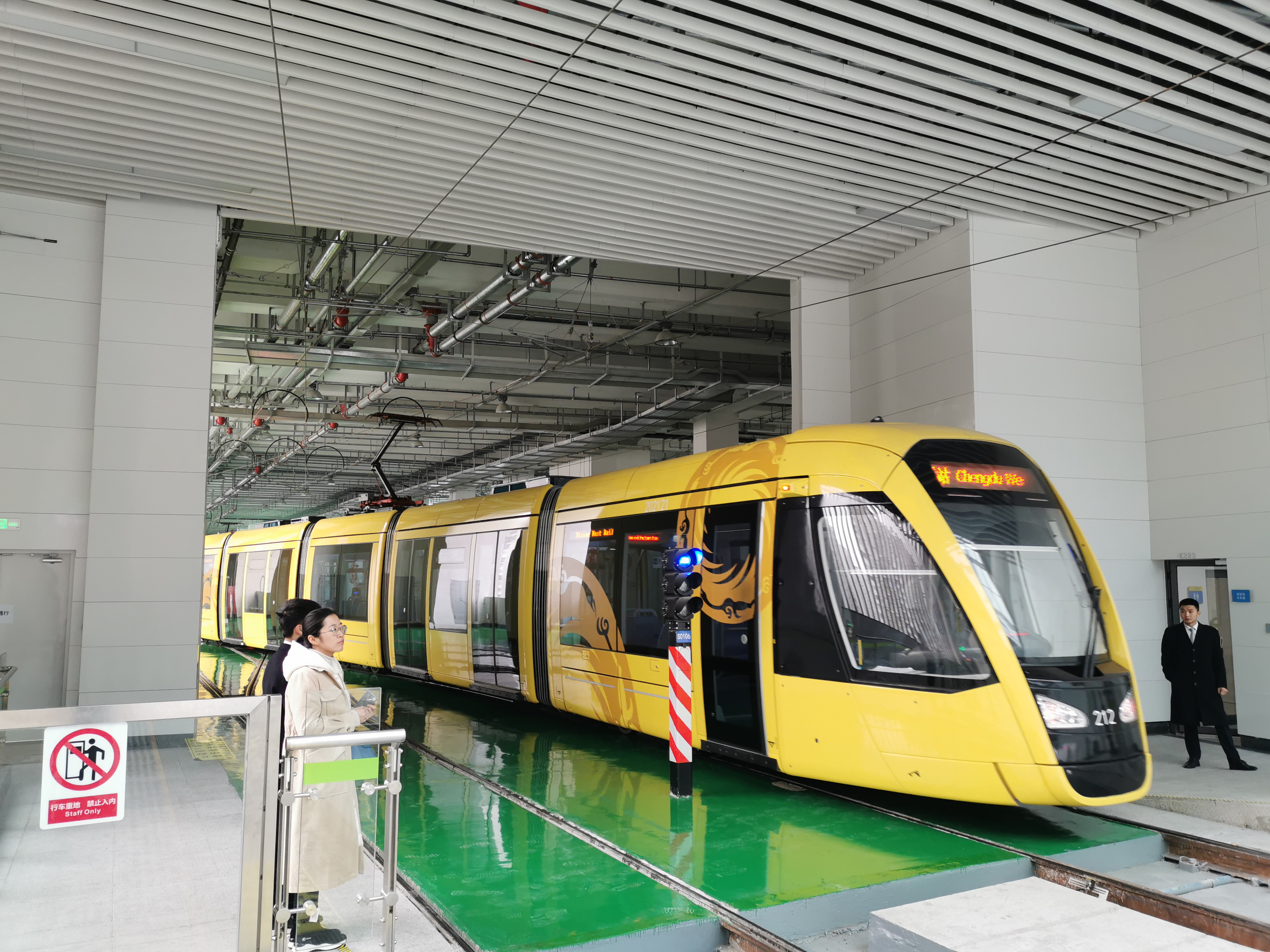
Tram at Chengdu West railway station

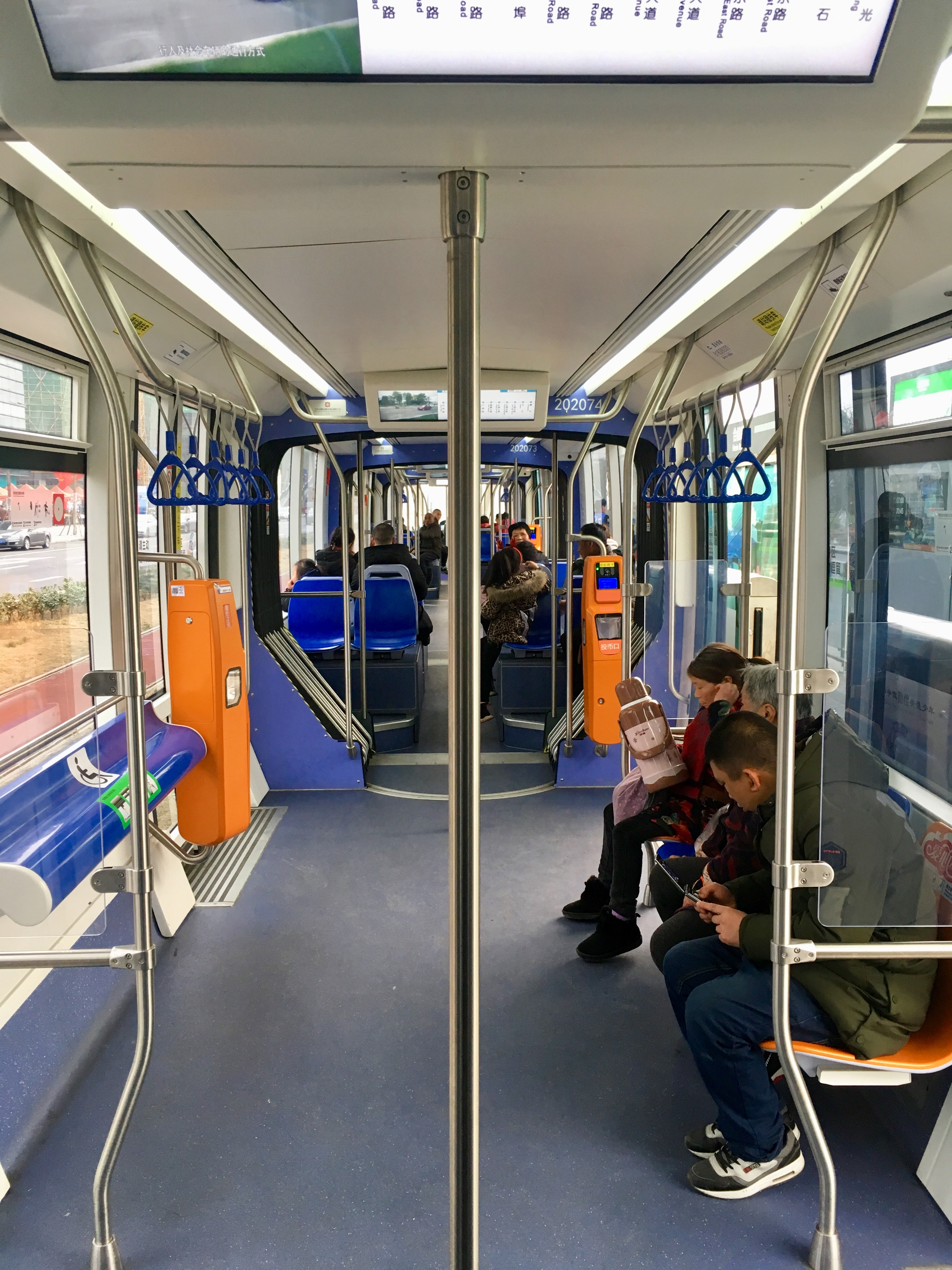
interior view of a tram

The Chengdu Tram Line 2 train has three colors of blue-green, light blue and bright yellow. It adopts the Alstom Citadis 302 technology platform 100% low-floor 5-module steel-wheeled tram, 32.6 m (106 ft 11 in) long and 2.65 m (8 ft 8 in) wide, manufactured in Chengdu's CRRC Changchun Railway Vehicles plant. The tram has 64 seats, a capacity of 300 people, and a maximum passenger capacity of 380 people. The average speed of the tram is 23 km/h (14 mph), the maximum speed is 70 km/h (43 mph), the maximum gradient is 60‰, and the minimum turning radius is 20 m (65 ft 7 in), vehicles uses a combination of super capacitor and ordinary catenary power supply to ensure the power when passing through some intersections. The car is equipped with barrier-free facilities and a button to open the door.

=== Theme tram ===
When the Chengdu route 2 was fully opened in 2019, a theme tram with the theme of "National Security Archives" went online simultaneously. The painting of the tram is based on the theme of spring, summer, autumn and winter, and nine nationally protected animals are interspersed in the form of illustrations, and corresponding science content is set in the car, calling on citizens to pay attention to and participate in the protection of endangered wild animals.

== Depots & termini ==
Termini are Chengdu West railway station, Pixian West railway station & Renhe.

== Alignment and Interchanges ==
Chengdu Tram Line 2 has a total length of 39.3 km (24.4 mi), of which the elevated section is 1.8 km (1.1 mi) and the ground section is 37.5 km (23.3 mi). Chengdu Tram Line 2 leads from Chengdu West Railway Station, heading northwest to Xinye Road Station, and then along two lines to Pixian West railway station and Renhe. In addition, in 2018, the newly planned Honggao branch line of Chengdu Line 2 leads from Hezuo Road Station to Jintu Station, connecting the Xipi section and the Xinhong section, making the whole line a ring.

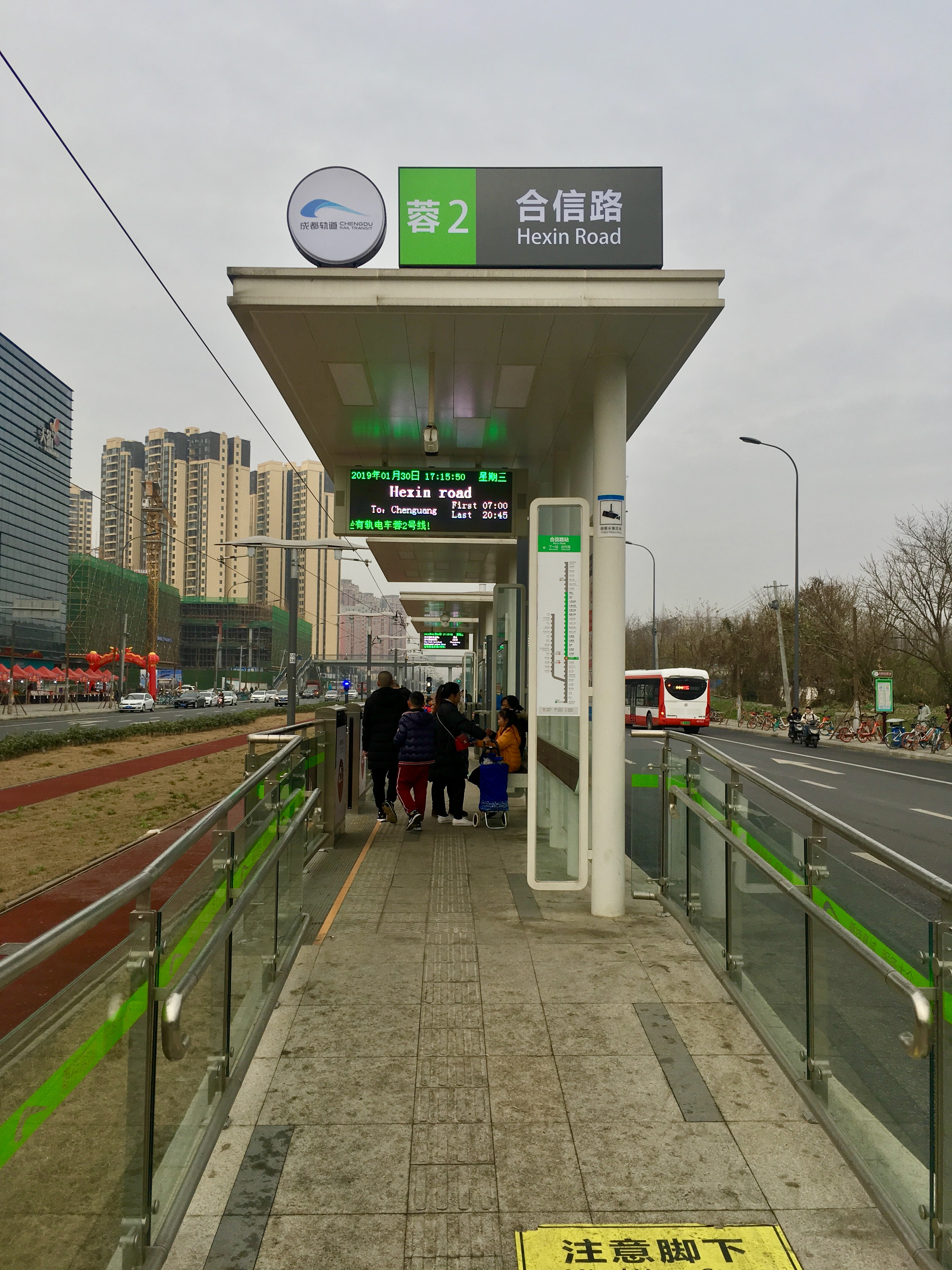
Chengdu tram platform

The platform of Chengdu Tram Line 2 is open, and passengers must purchase tickets or swipe cards on the train. The platforms of the first section are all side platforms, and are equipped with half-height screen doors (not in use), seats and train information display screens. The platforms on both sides are not symmetrical and do not communicate directly. For the sake of cost saving and easy maintenance, the subsequent stations did not install half-height screen doors, and replaced the tempered glass railings with wire mesh materials.

- Transfer at Chengdu West Railway Station: Chengdu Metro Line 4; Chengpu Line of the China High Speed Railway
- Transfer at Tianhe Road station: Chengdu Metro Line 2 (Tianhe Road station)
- Transfer at Longyin station: Chengdu Metro Line 6 (Zitonggong station)
- Transfer at Wangcong Temple station: Chengdu Metro Line 6 (Wangcong Temple station)

== Tickets ==
The fare of the line is two yuan for the whole journey, which is paid by cash or Tianfutong, and supports Tianfutong, Cloud QuickPass or the application of two-dimensional code scanning in Chengdu Metro.

== See also ==
- Line 1 (Chengdu Tram)
- Chengdu Metro
- Trams in China
