= Chengdu–Dujiangyan intercity railway =

Railway line in Sichuan Province, China

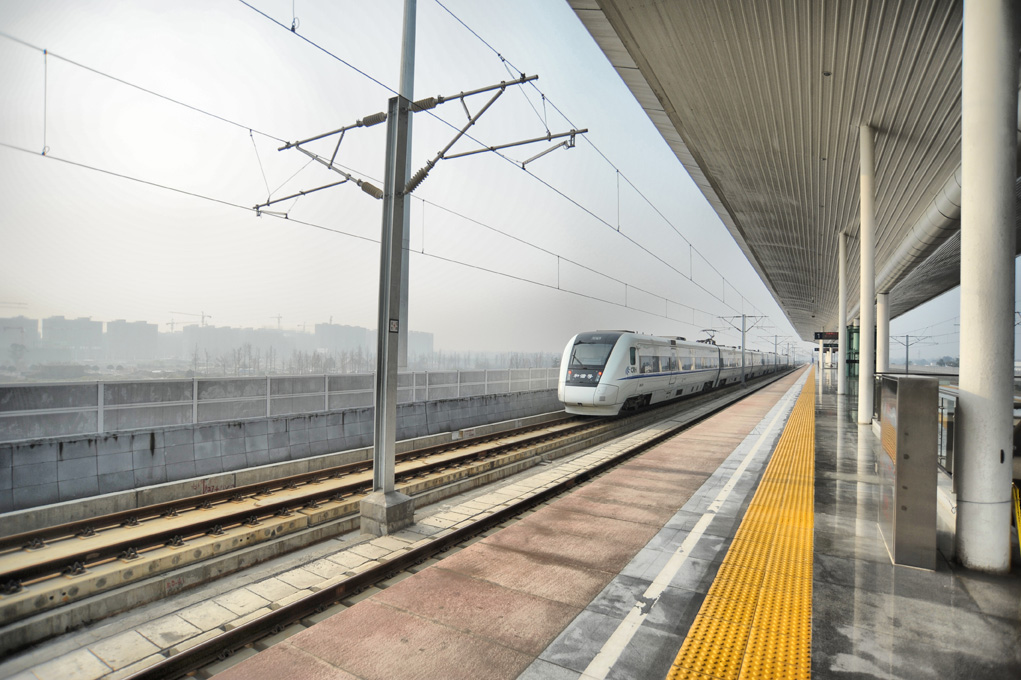
- A CRH1A high speed train at the Pixian West station

Overview
- Native name: 成灌铁路
- Status: Operational
- Owner: China Railway
- Locale: Sichuan province: Chengdu; Dujiangyan
- Termini: Chengdu; Qingchengshan Lidui Park Pengzhou
- Stations: 21

Service
- Type: Higher-speed rail
- System: China Railway High-speed
- Services: 1
- Operator(s): CR Chengdu

History
- Opened: May 12, 2010

Technical
- Line length: 94.2 km (59 mi)
- Track gauge: 1,435 mm (4 ft 8 1/2 in) standard gauge
- Electrification: 25 kV 50 Hz AC (Overhead line)
- Operating speed: 220 km/h (136.7 mph) max.

The Chengdu–Dujiangyan intercity railway is a dual-track, electrified, passenger-dedicated, higher-speed rail line in Sichuan Province, connecting the provincial capital, Chengdu with the satellite city of Dujiangyan. The line is 65 kilometres (40 mi) in length with 15 stations. China Railways CRH1 train set on the line reach a maximum speed of 220 kilometres per hour (140 mph) and make the full-trip in 30 minutes, before 2018. The line was built in 18 months and entered into operation on May 12, 2010. The railway is built to withstand an 8.0-magnitude earthquake. The Chengdu–Dujiangyan intercity railway has two branch lines: Pengzhou Branch line is 21.2 kilometres (13.2 mi) in length with 6 stations, and Lidui Branch line is 6 kilometres (3.7 mi) in length with 3 stations. In 2019, China Railways CRH6A-A (Tianfu) train sets on the line started to operate up to 200 kilometres per hour (120 mph).

== Route ==
The railway runs from Chengdu railway station to Dujiangyan's Qingchengshan railway station and passes through Pidu District. Bridges and tunnels account for 67.8% of the line's total length. The longest viaduct is some 21 kilometres (13 mi). The line is built to withstand future earthquakes. Sound insulation panels were installed alongside the railway to reduce train noise near the tracks. Clear panels allow passengers to enjoy rural scenery along this route. The line shortened rail travel time from Chengdu to Dujiangyan by half, and will bring more tourist traffic to Dujiangyan's World Heritage Sites, the city's ancient irrigation system and Mount Qingcheng, a sacred Daoist mountain.

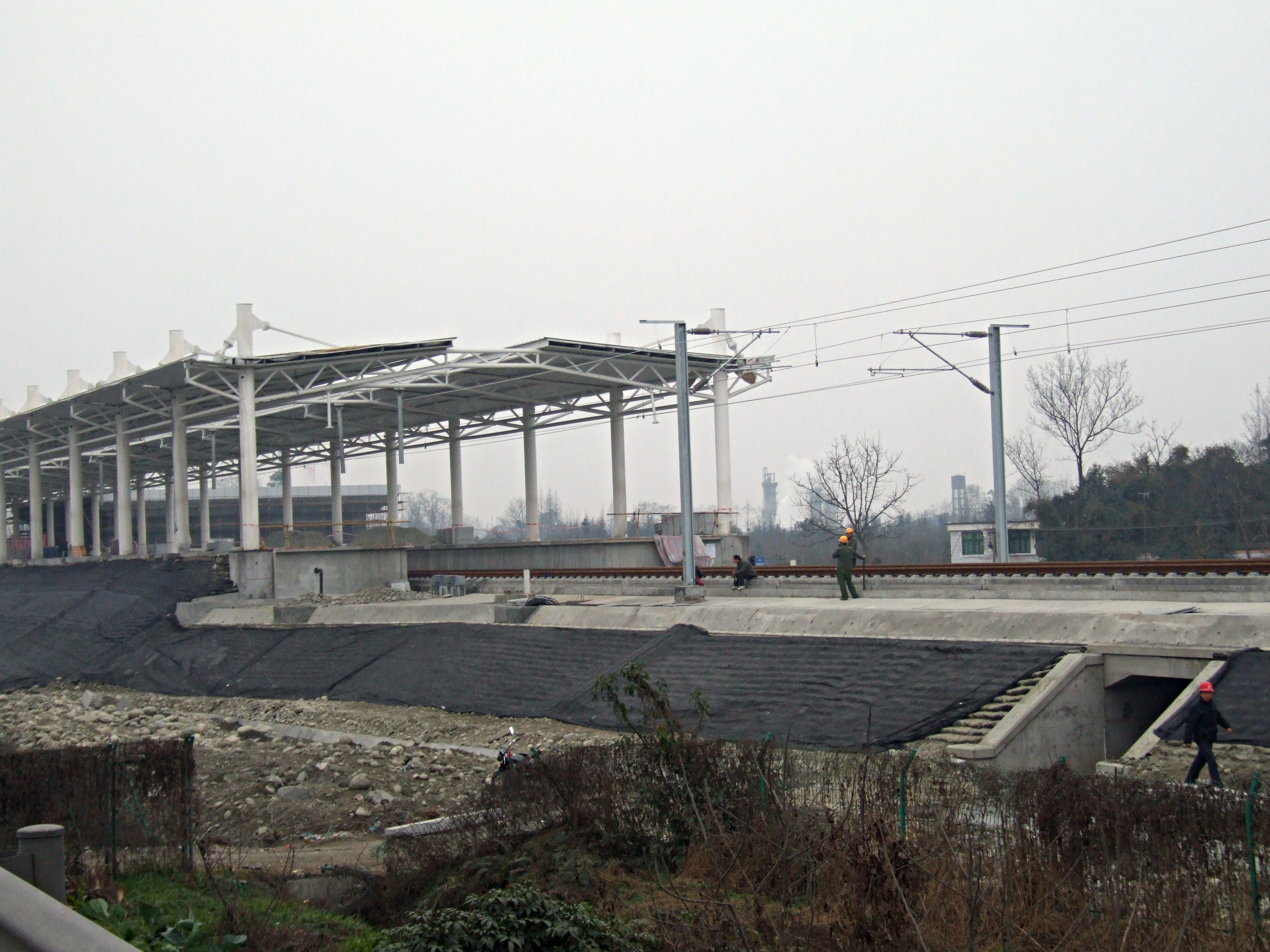
Chengdu–Dujiangyan high-speed railway under construction

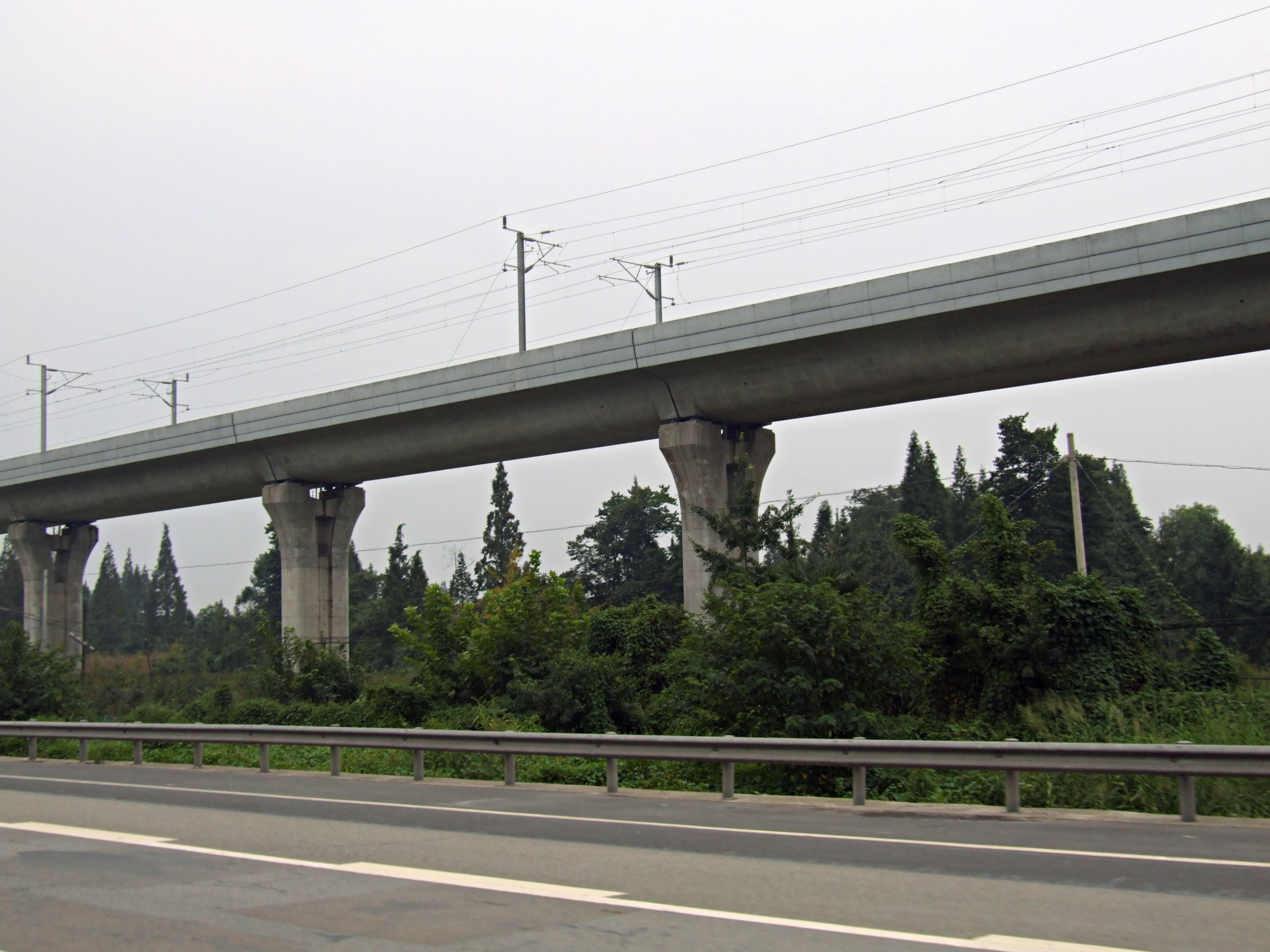
Chengdu–Dujiangyan high-speed railway's elevated tracks

== Trains ==
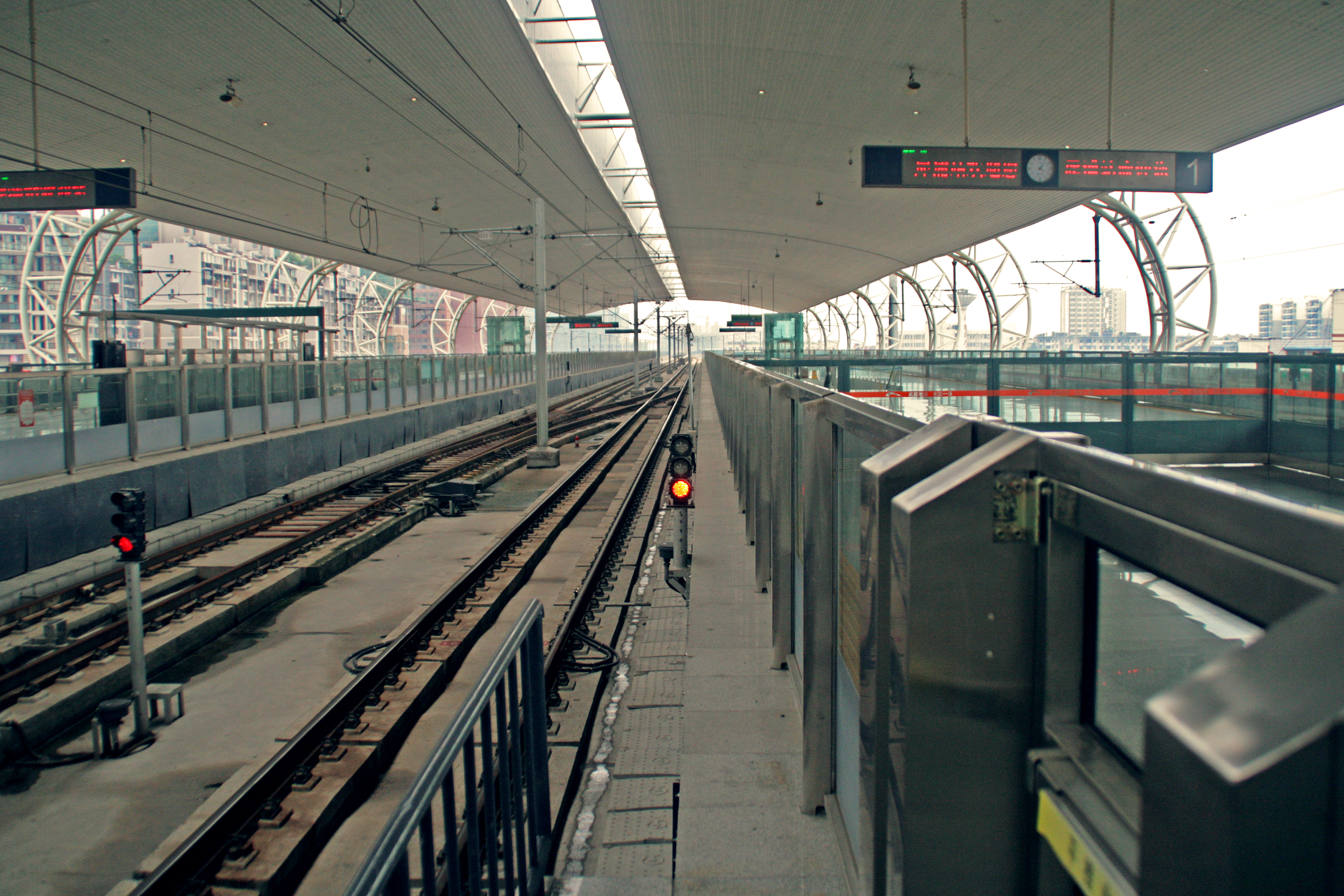
Cross-platform interchanges between different train categories between different train categories in Xipu Railway Station, Chengdu. The double track of the urban railway (Line 2 of Chengdu Metro) is in the middle, while the double track of National rail transport system (Chengdu–Dujiangyan intercity railway) is on both sides, respectively. It is the first implementation of Cross-platform interchanges between different train categories in China.

The route uses CRH1 trains in eight-car train sets, which can carry 661 passengers. Each day, 14 pairs of trains are scheduled daily between Chengdu and Qingchengshan Station, and 1 pair of trains are scheduled daily between Chengdu and Dujiangyan Station. 6 pairs start Chengdu Station and head up the Pengzhou Branch.

== Stations ==
Stations and structures of Chengdu–Dujiangyan intercity railway

- Principal Line: Chengdu · Anjing · Xipu East · Xipu · Hongguangzhen · Pixian East · Pixian · Pixian West · Ande · Chongyi (planned) · Juyuan · Dujiangyan · Zhongxing (planned) · Qingchengshan
- Pengzhou Branch Line: Pixian West · Xinmin · Sandaoyan · Gucheng · Pengzhou South · Buxingjie · Pengzhou
- Lidui Branch Line: Juyuan · Yingbin Road · Libing Square · Lidui Park

=== Prices ===
Prices(¥)	Chengdu	Xipu	Hongguangzhen	Pi County West	Dujiangyan	Qingchengshan
Chengdu	-	5	5	10	15	15
Xipu	5	-	5	5	10	10
Hongguangzhen	5	5	-	5	10	10
Pi County West	10	5	5	-	10	10
Dujiangyan	15	10	10	10	-	5
Qingchengshan	15	10	10	10	5	-

== History ==
On May 28, 2008, 16 days after the Wenchuan earthquake devastated Dujiangyan and the western suburbs of Chengdu, the Chengdu city government and the Ministry of Railways agreed to build a high-speed railway line as part of the reconstruction of the disaster zone. Construction began on November 4, 2008, and involved 20,000 workers at the cost of ¥13 billion. The line entered trial operation on April 1, 2010, and full commercial operation began on May 12, 2010, the second anniversary of the large earthquake that killed some 70,000 people in the region.
