= Line 1 (Chengdu Tram) =

Planned tram line in Chengdu, China

Chengdu Tram Line 1

Overview
- Native name: 成都有轨电车蓉1号线
- Status: Under planning
- Locale: Chengdu
- Stations: 16

Service
- Type: Tram
- Services: 1

Technical
- Line length: 9.62 km (5.98 mi)
- Track gauge: 1,435 mm (4 ft 8 1/2 in) standard gauge

Chengdu Tram Line 1 is under planning. It was once named Yizhou Avenue Tram, with a total length of 9.62 kilometers and 16 stations. The route is planned to be laid along Yizhou Avenue, starting from Chengdu South railway station and arriving at Huayang Hualong Bridge. At the beginning of 2015, the route of the Yizhou Avenue tram demonstration line (Line 1) was announced. In mid-2015, the official website of Chengdu Metro issued the "Announcement of the General Contracting Bidding for the Survey and Design of the Chengdu Yizhou Avenue Tram Demonstration Line". At the end of 2015, the names and locations of 16 stations on the line were announced. In January 2016, in order to alleviate the traffic pressure in the southern part of Chengdu, the Chengdu Tram Line 1 project announced the suspension of construction.

Chengdu Tram Line 1 would start at Chengdu South Railway Station and ends at Huayang, with a total of 16 stations. The total length of the line is 9.62 kilometers, of which the elevated section is 0.91 kilometers and the ground section is 8.71 kilometers.

== See also ==
- Line 2 (Chengdu Tram)
