= Xipu station =

Railway and metro station in Chengdu, China

Coordinates: 30.76029°N 103.96983°E

Xipu 犀浦
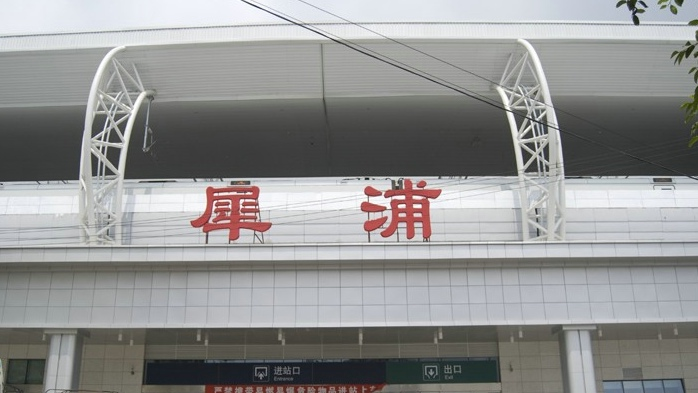

General information
- Location: Pidu District, Chengdu, Sichuan; China
- Operated by: China Railway Chengdu Group; China Railway Corporation; Chengdu Metro Limited
- Lines: Chengdu–Dujiangyan intercity railway; Line 2; Line 6
- Platforms: 6 (3 island platforms)

Other information
- Station code: China Railway; Telegraph code: XIW; Pinyin code: XPU; TMIS code: 46042; Chengdu Metro; 0232 0609

History
- Opened: 12 May 2010

Services
Preceding station	China Railway High-speed	Following station
Xipu East towards Chengdu	Chengdu–Dujiangyan intercity railway	Hongguangzhen towards Qingchengshan, Lidui Park or Pengzhou
Preceding station	Chengdu Metro	Following station
Tianhe Road towards Longquanyi	Line 2	Terminus
Tianyu Road towards Wangcong Temple	Line 6	Southwest Jiaotong University & Xingye North Street towards Lanjiagou
Location

Xipu (Chinese: 犀浦; pinyin: Xīpǔ) is a railway station on the Chengdu–Dujiangyan intercity railway, Line 2 and on Line 6 of the Chengdu Metro. The station is located in Pidu District, Chengdu, Sichuan, China.

== Station layout ==
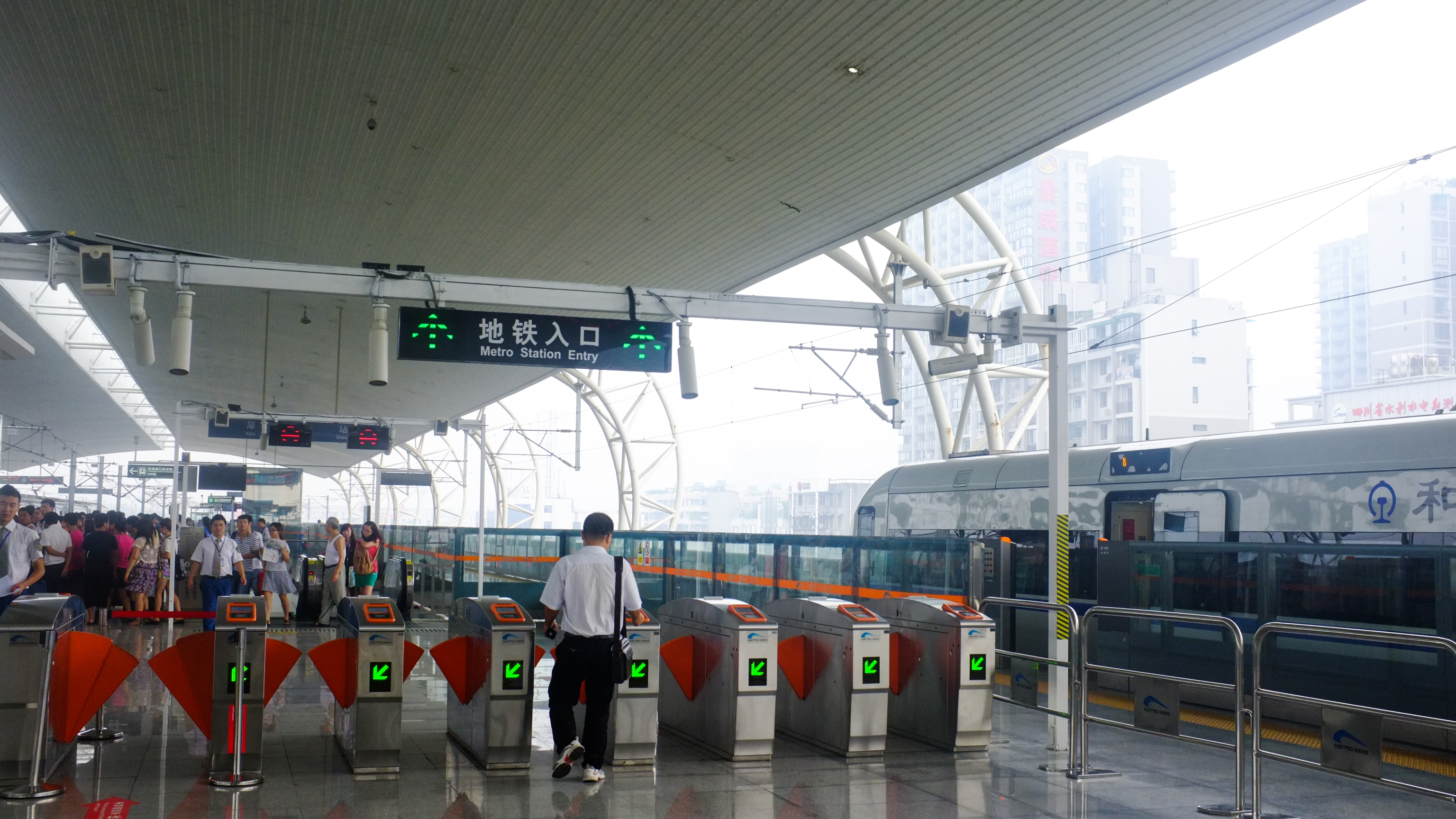
Two tracks of Chengdu–Dujiangyan intercity railway are outside the two Chengdu Metro tracks. The picture displays a CRH train in Xipu Station.

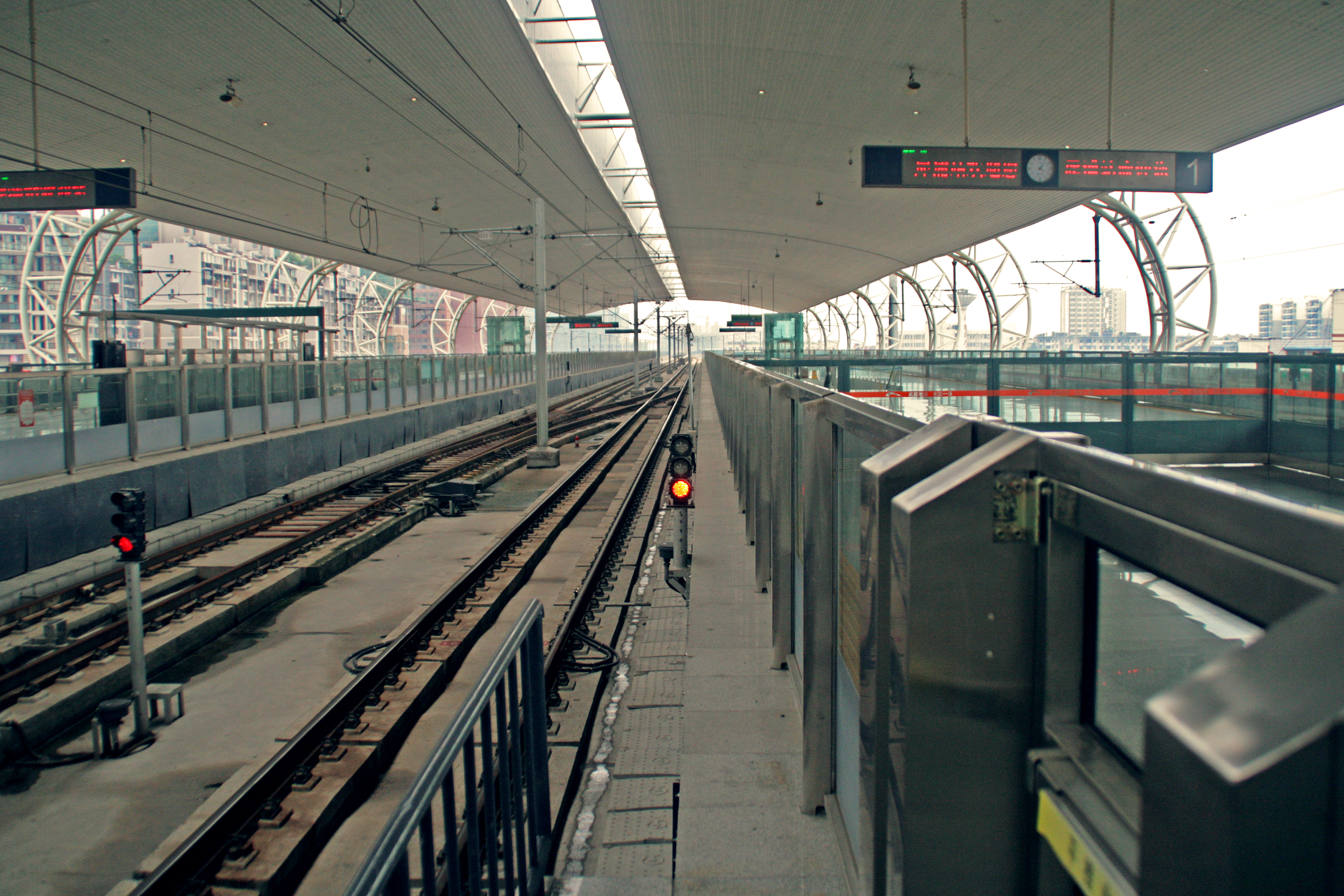
Cross-platform interchanges. The double track of the Line 2 is in the middle, while the double track of China Railway Chengdu–Dujiangyan intercity railway is on both sides.

Xipu station houses the first implementation of cross-platform interchange between different train categories in China, between Line 2 of the Chengdu Metro and the Chengdu–Dujiangyan intercity railway. The Chengdu Metro Line 2 platforms began operation on 8 June 2013.

Floorplan
2F	Eastbound	Chengdu–Dujiangyan intercity railway towards Chengdu →
2F	Island platform, doors will open on the left, right
2F	Eastbound	Line 2 towards Longquanyi (Tianhe Road) →
2F	Westbound	← Line 2 termination track
2F	Island platform, doors will open on the left, right
2F	Westbound	← Chengdu–Dujiangyan intercity railway towards Qingchengshan or Lidui Park
1F	Concourse	Tickets, waiting room
G	Entrances and Exits	Exits A-F
B1	Concourse	Faregates, Station Agent
B2	Northbound	← Line 6 to Wangcong Temple (Tianyu Road)
