= Kuiguang Pagoda =

Pagoda in Dujiangyan City, China

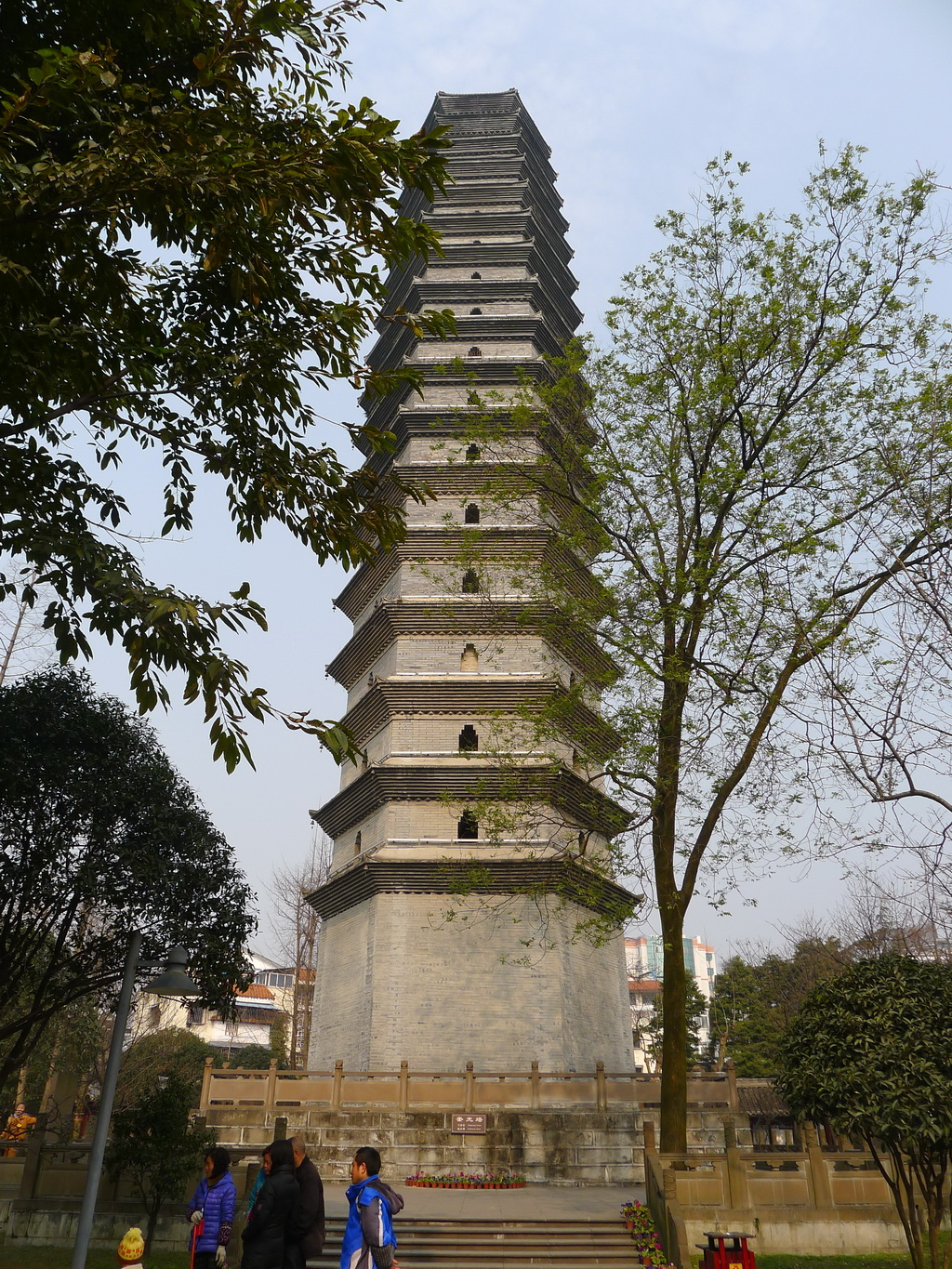
Kuiguang Pagoda

The Kuiguang Pagoda (奎光塔; Kúi Gūang Tǎ) of Dujiangyan City, Sichuan province, China, is a pagoda built in 1831 during the Qing dynasty.

== Structure ==
The pagoda is 50 meters tall, hexagonal, and is the pagoda with the greatest number of floors in China, with 17. The pagoda is built on a low stone foundation, with the first floor being the largest, containing an arched doorway. The second floor marks the first set of eaves, and false doors, which are present on each subsequent floor. Some floors also have real doors.
