= Qingchengshan railway station =

Railway station in Qingchengshan, China

Qingchengshan 青城山
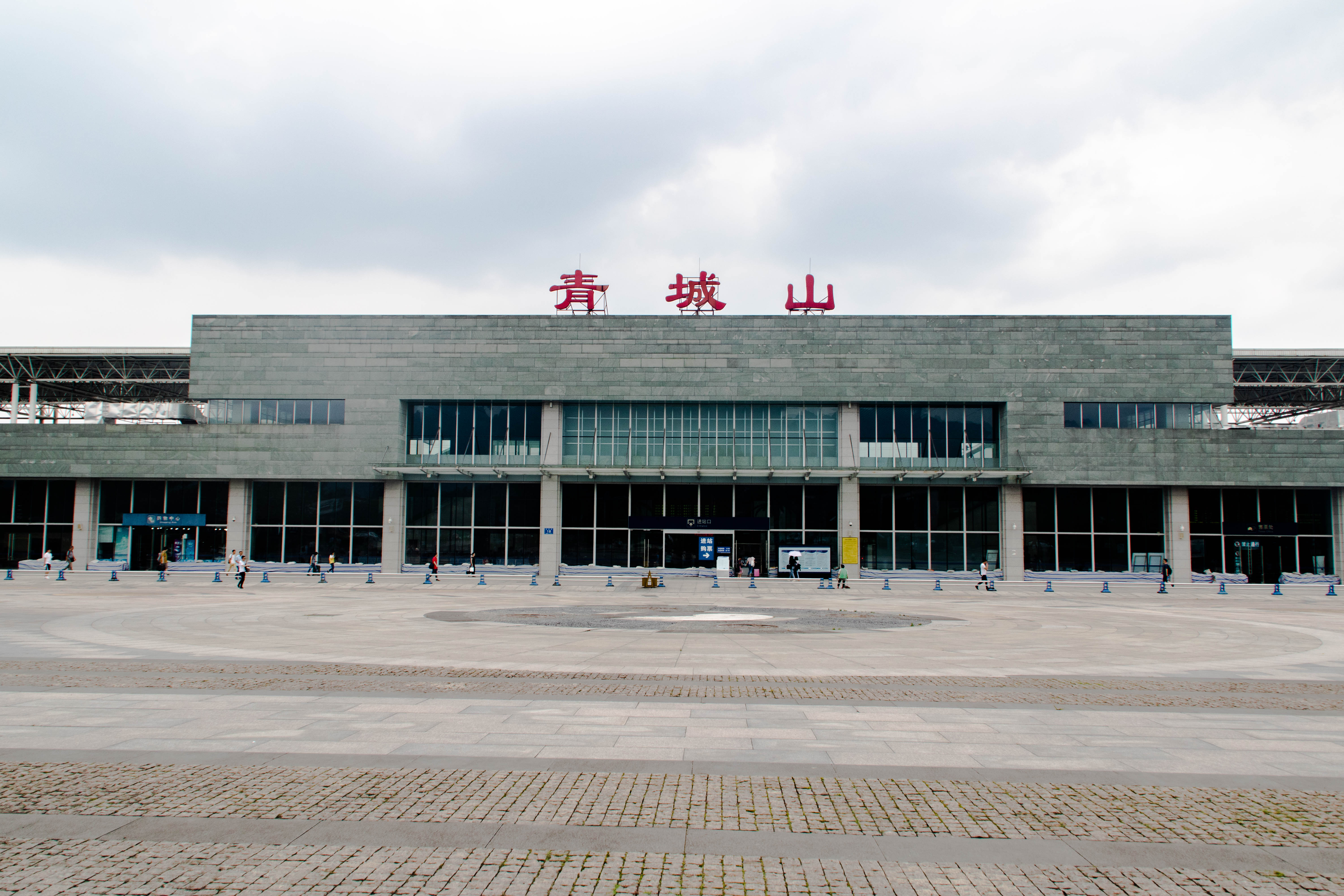

General information
- Location: Dujiangyan, Chengdu, Sichuan; China
- Coordinates: 30.89°N 103.6°E
- Operator: Chengdu Railway Bureau, China Railway Corporation
- Line: Chengdu–Dujiangyan Intercity Railway
- Platforms: 2

History
- Opened: 2010
Location
- Location within Sichuan Location within China

Qingchengshan railway station (Chinese: 青城山站; pinyin: Qīngchéngshān Zhàn; lit. 'Mount Qingcheng railway station') is a railway station of Chengdu–Dujiangyan Intercity Railway. The station located in Dujiangyan, Chengdu, Sichuan, China.

== Destinations and Prices ==
Destinations	Chengdu	Xipu	Hongguangzhen	Pixian West	Dujiangyan
Prices(¥)	15	10	10	10	5

== Rolling stock ==
China Railways CRH1A

== See also ==
- Chengdu–Dujiangyan Intercity Railway

Preceding station	China Railway High-speed	Following station
Dujiangyan towards Chengdu	Chengdu–Dujiangyan intercity railway	Terminus
