= Lidui Park railway station =

Railway station in Chengdu, China

Lidui Park 离堆公园
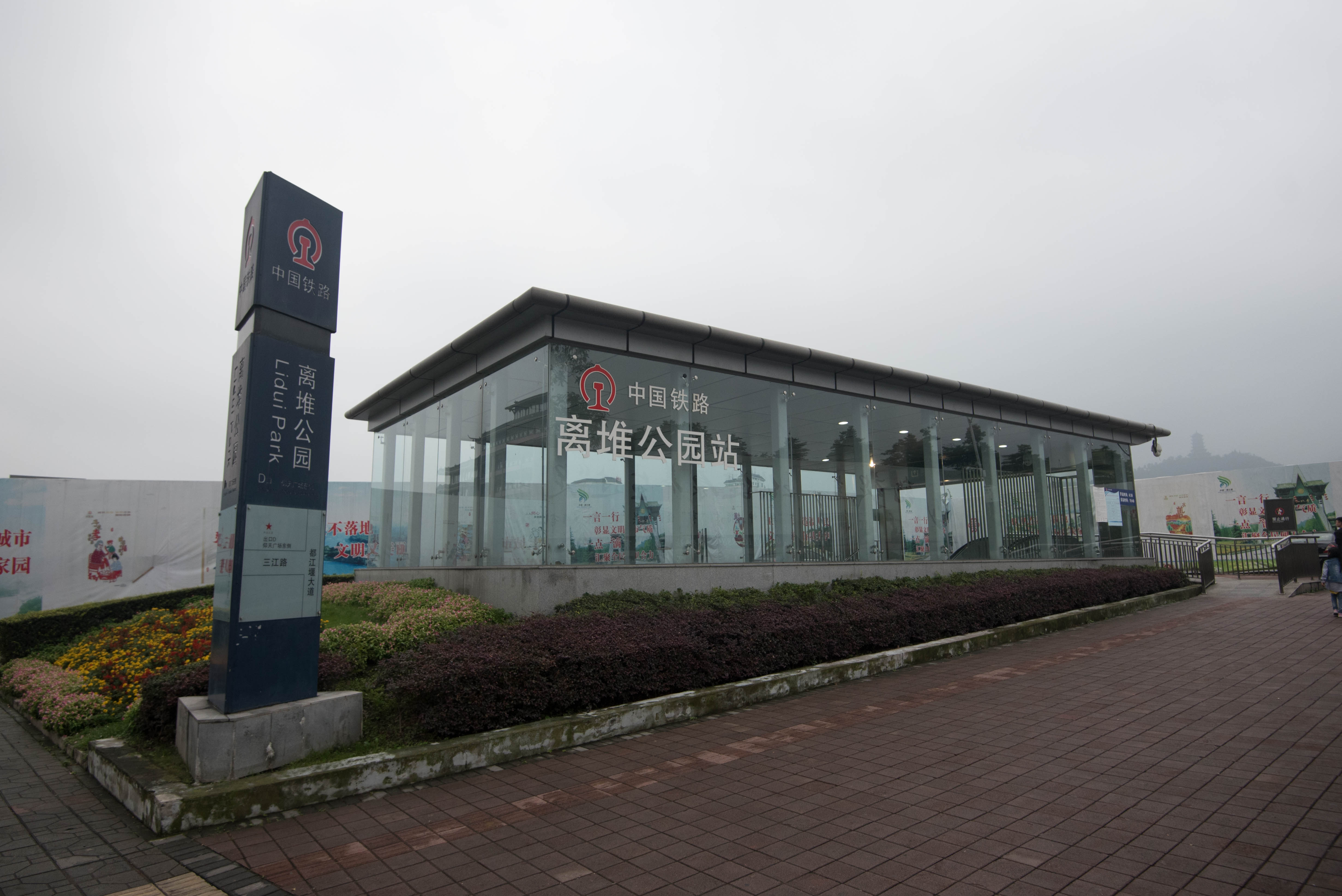

General information
- Location: Dujiangyan, Chengdu, Sichuan; China
- Operated by: Chengdu Railway Bureau, China Railway Corporation
- Line: Chengdu–Dujiangyan Intercity Railway
- Platforms: 2

History
- Opened: 2013
- Previous names: Guanxian Ancient Town
Location

The Lidui Park railway station (Chinese: 离堆公园站; pinyin: Líduī Gōngyuán Zhàn) is an underground railway station. The former name is Guanxian Ancient Town railway station. The railway station is on the Lidui Branch Line of Chengdu–Dujiangyan Intercity Railway in Dujiangyan, Chengdu, Sichuan, China. This railway station is 12192 square metres.

== Destinations and Prices ==
Destinations	Chengdu	Xipu	Hongguangzhen	Pixian West	Yingbin Road
Prices(¥)	15	10	10	10	5

== Rolling Stock ==
- China Railways CRH1A

== See also ==
- Chengdu–Dujiangyan Intercity Railway

Preceding station	China Railway High-speed	Following station
Libing Square towards Chengdu	Chengdu–Dujiangyan intercity railway	Terminus
