= Dujiangyan City =

Dujiangyan 都江堰市
- County-level city
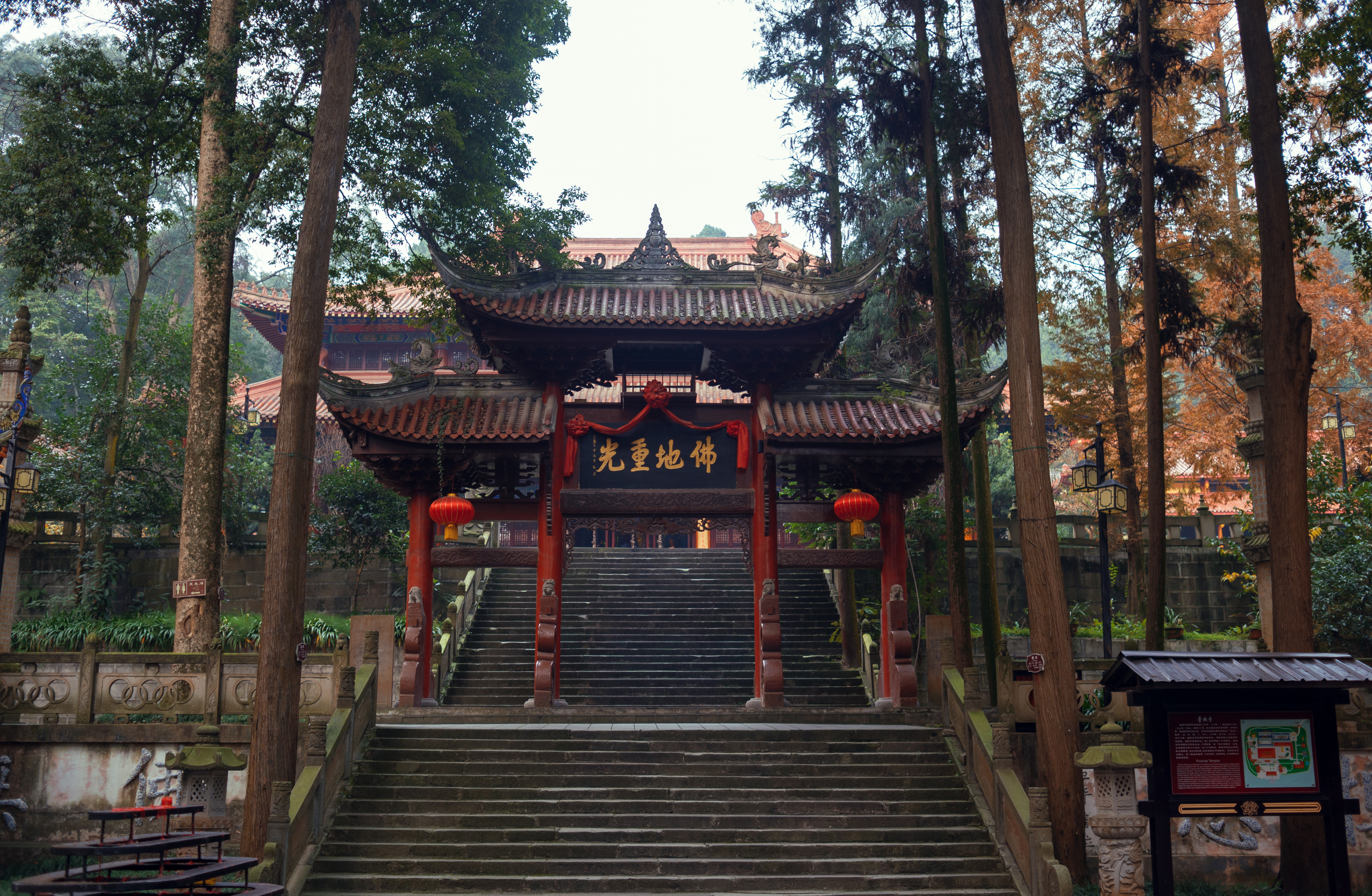
- Puzhao Temple in Dujiangyan
- Etymology: Dujiangyan
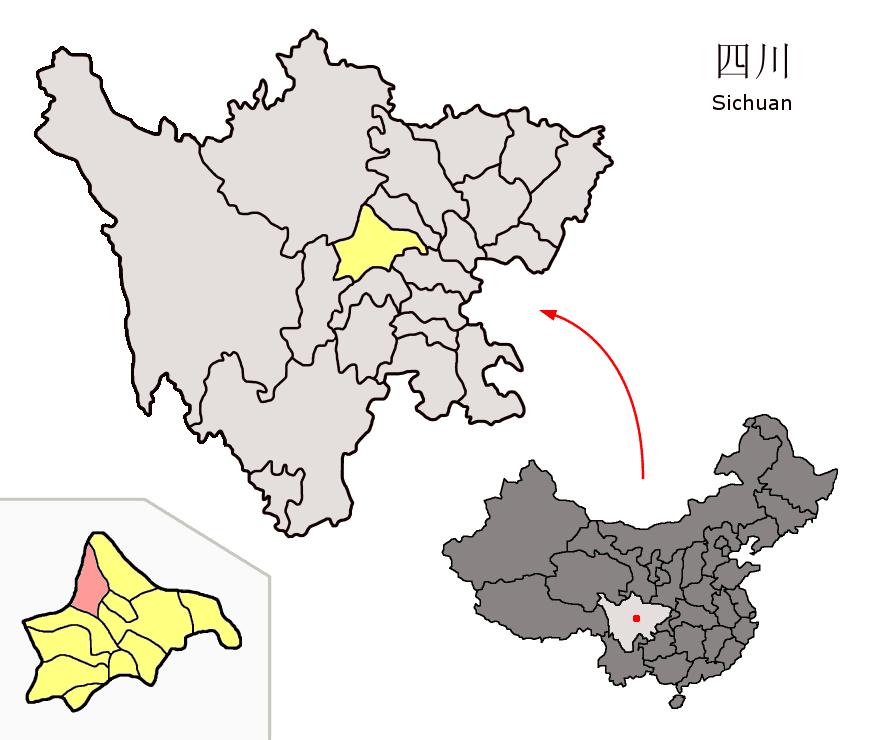
- Location of Dujiangyan in Sichuan

- Location in Sichuan Province
- Coordinates (Dujiangyan Government): 30°59′17″N 103°38′49″E
- Country: China
- Province: Sichuan
- Sub-provincial city: Chengdu
- Municipal seat: Guankou Subdistrict

Area
  - Total: 1,208 km^{2} (466 sq mi)

Population (2020)
  - Total: 710,056
  - Density: 545/km^{2} (1,410/sq mi)
- Time zone: UTC+8 (China Standard)
- Postal code: 6118XX
- Website: www.djy.gov.cn

Dujiangyan
- Chinese: 都江堰
- Postal: Tukiangyen; Kwanhsien (until 1988)
Transcriptions
Standard Mandarin
- Hanyu Pinyin: Dūjiāngyàn
- Wade–Giles: Tu^{1}-chiang^{1}-yan^{4}

Guanxian
- Traditional Chinese: 灌縣
- Simplified Chinese: 灌县
- Postal: Kwanhsien
Transcriptions
Standard Mandarin
- Hanyu Pinyin: Guànxiàn
- Wade–Giles: Kuan^{4}-hsien^{4}

Dujiangyan (Chinese: 都江堰; pinyin: Dūjiāngyàn) is a county-level city of Sichuan Province, Southwest China. It is under the administration of the prefecture-level city of Chengdu. Its north-west region forms a border with southern Ngawa Tibetan and Qiang Autonomous Prefecture. It has an area of 1,208 km^{2} (466 sq mi) and had a population of 710,056 in 2020.

Dujiangyan was formerly a county named Guanxian or Guan County (灌县; 'irrigation county'). The county became a county-level city in 1988 and was renamed after the Dujiangyan Irrigation System, in the city's northwest, famous for providing Chengdu with water for over two millennia, since around 250 BC.

== History ==
Around 250 BC during the Warring States period, Li Bing, a governor of Shu (present Sichuan Province) in the Qin state with his son directed the construction of Dujiangyan. Li Bing gave up the old ways of dam building, which were simply directed at flood control, employing a new method of channeling and dividing the water of the Min River. He accomplished this by separating the project into two main parts: the headwork and the irrigation system. The whole system has functioned for 2,000 years, preventing floods and providing substantial irrigation and facilitating shipping and wood drifting. It has contributed greatly to the richness of Chengdu Plain with its reputation as "The Land of Abundance".

On 12 May 2008, the city was the closest to the epicenter of the 2008 Sichuan earthquake and the city suffered severe damage. Xinjian Primary School, Juyuan Middle School, and Xiang'e Middle School collapsed in the earthquake.

== Climate ==
Dujiangyan has a monsoon-influenced humid subtropical climate (Köppen Cwa) with cool, dry winters and hot, very wet summers.

Climate data for Dujiangyan, elevation 689 m (2,260 ft), (1991–2020 normals, extremes 1971–present)
Month	Jan	Feb	Mar	Apr	May	Jun	Jul	Aug	Sep	Oct	Nov	Dec	Year
Record high °C (°F)	18.4 (65.1)	21.0 (69.8)	29.7 (85.5)	31.3 (88.3)	33.4 (92.1)	34.7 (94.5)	35.5 (95.9)	37.9 (100.2)	34.2 (93.6)	28.2 (82.8)	24.8 (76.6)	17.7 (63.9)	37.9 (100.2)
Mean daily maximum °C (°F)	8.5 (47.3)	11.1 (52.0)	15.7 (60.3)	21.3 (70.3)	25.1 (77.2)	27.4 (81.3)	29.4 (84.9)	29.1 (84.4)	24.7 (76.5)	19.7 (67.5)	15.2 (59.4)	10.0 (50.0)	19.8 (67.6)
Daily mean °C (°F)	5.2 (41.4)	7.5 (45.5)	11.6 (52.9)	16.7 (62.1)	20.6 (69.1)	23.3 (73.9)	25.2 (77.4)	24.8 (76.6)	21.0 (69.8)	16.4 (61.5)	11.8 (53.2)	6.6 (43.9)	15.9 (60.6)
Mean daily minimum °C (°F)	2.7 (36.9)	4.9 (40.8)	8.4 (47.1)	13.1 (55.6)	17.0 (62.6)	20.0 (68.0)	21.9 (71.4)	21.6 (70.9)	18.5 (65.3)	14.2 (57.6)	9.5 (49.1)	4.2 (39.6)	13.0 (55.4)
Record low °C (°F)	−5.0 (23.0)	−3.6 (25.5)	−2.9 (26.8)	0.4 (32.7)	6.4 (43.5)	13.1 (55.6)	15.6 (60.1)	15.0 (59.0)	11.9 (53.4)	2.9 (37.2)	−0.2 (31.6)	−7.1 (19.2)	−7.1 (19.2)
Average precipitation mm (inches)	15.3 (0.60)	20.2 (0.80)	41.9 (1.65)	65.7 (2.59)	91.3 (3.59)	115.8 (4.56)	266.5 (10.49)	273.4 (10.76)	161.2 (6.35)	71.3 (2.81)	30.9 (1.22)	13.0 (0.51)	1,166.5 (45.93)
Average precipitation days (≥ 0.1 mm)	11.0	12.0	14.2	15.2	16.2	16.7	18.0	17.2	19.3	19.5	11.5	9.1	179.9
Average snowy days	3.2	1.3	0.1	0	0	0	0	0	0	0	0.1	0.7	5.4
Average relative humidity (%)	80	79	76	74	71	75	78	79	83	84	82	81	79
Mean monthly sunshine hours	46.2	45.8	67.2	93.9	96.9	86.6	108.4	106.6	46.8	39.0	47.7	49.7	834.8
Percentage possible sunshine	14	15	18	24	23	21	25	26	13	11	15	16	18
Source 1: China Meteorological Administration all-time extreme temperature all-time January high
Source 2: Weather China

== Administrative divisions ==
Dujiangyan has 6 subdistricts and 5 towns:

- Kuiguangta Subdistrict 奎光塔街道
- Xingfu Subdistrict 幸福街道
- Guankou Subdistrict 灌口街道
- Yinxing Subdistrict 银杏街道
- Yutang Subdistrict 玉堂街道
- Puyang Subdistrict 蒲阳街道
- Juyuan Town 聚源镇
- Tianma Town 天马镇
- Shiyang Town 石羊镇
- Qingchengshan Town 青城山镇
- Longchi Town 龙池镇

== Transport ==
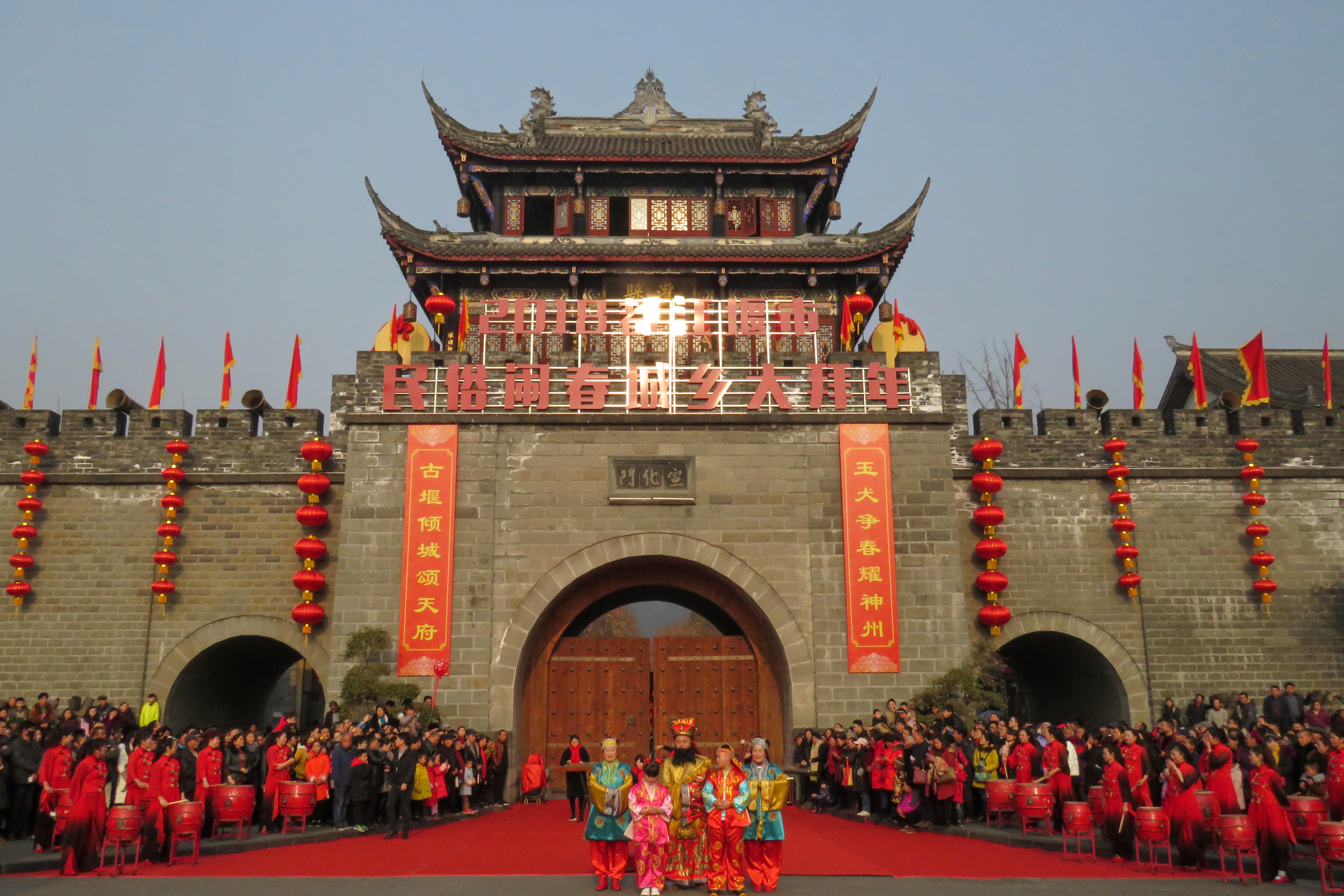
Xuanhua Gate of Dujiangyan on 2018 Chinese New Year

- China National Highway 317
- Chengdu–Dujiangyan High-Speed Railway
- Dujiangyan railway station

A tram system with two lines and 17.3km of track opened in 2024.

== See also ==
- Dujiangyan Irrigation System
- Kuiguang Pagoda
