= Pidu, Chengdu =

District of Chengdu, Sichuan, China

Pidu 郫都区
- District
- District of Pidu, City of Chengdu
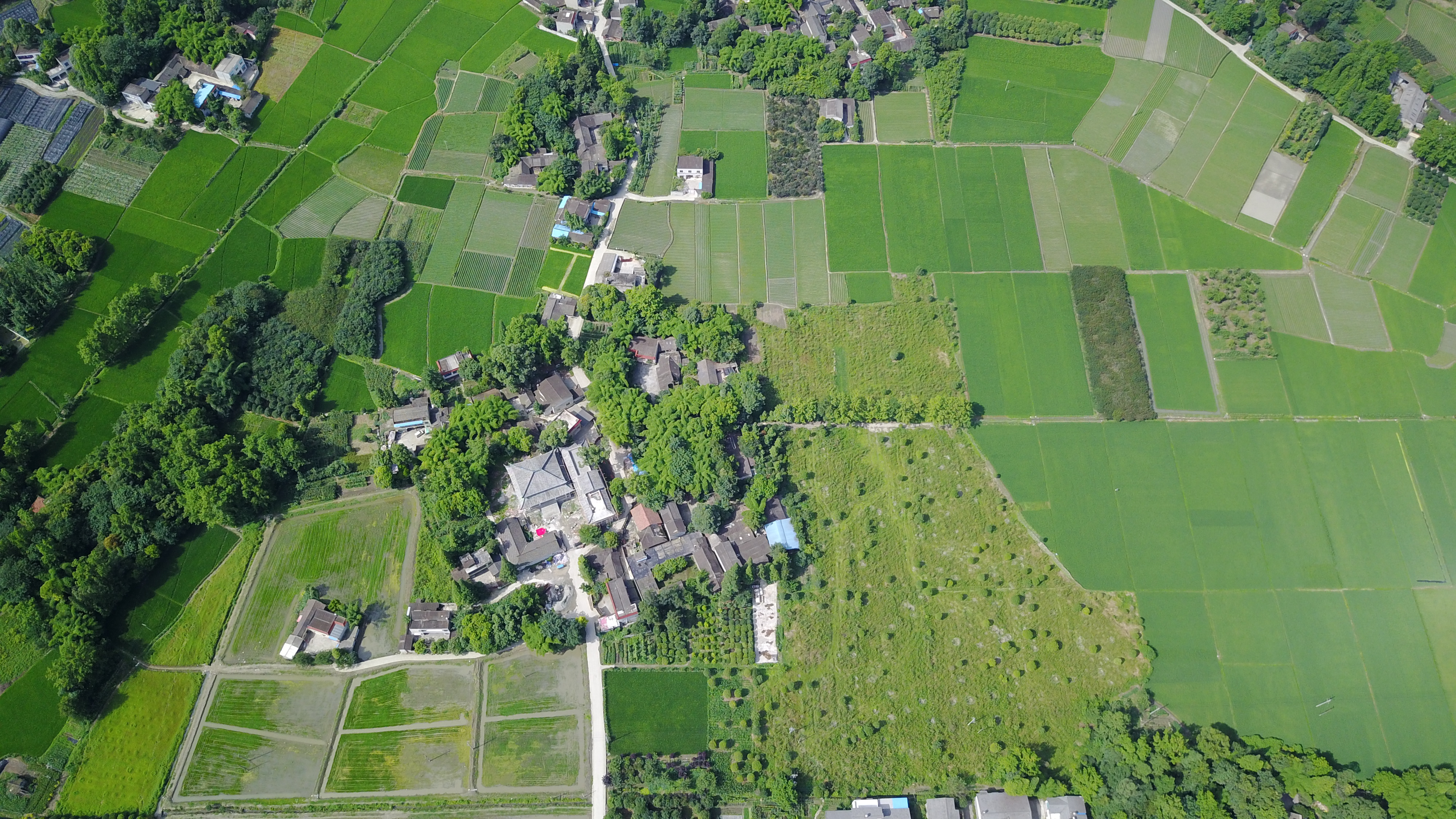

- Location in Sichuan Pidu (China)
- Coordinates: 30.805°N 103.881°E
- Country: China
- Province: Sichuan
- Sub-provincial city: Chengdu
- District seat: Pitong Subdistrict

Area
  - Total: 437.5 km^{2} (168.9 sq mi)

Population (2020 census)
  - Total: 1,672,025
  - Density: 3,822/km^{2} (9,898/sq mi)
- Time zone: UTC+8 (China Standard)
- Postal code: 6117XX
- Website: pixian.gov.cn

Pidu, Chengdu
- Chinese: 郫都
Transcriptions
Standard Mandarin
- Hanyu Pinyin: Pídū

Alternative Chinese name
- Traditional Chinese: 郫縣
- Simplified Chinese: 郫县
Transcriptions
Standard Mandarin
- Hanyu Pinyin: Píxiàn

Pidu District (郫都区; formerly known as Pi County or Pixian (Note: Also formerly romanized as Pe Heen.)) is a suburban district of the City of Chengdu, Sichuan, China. It presently covers an area of 437.5 square kilometers (168.9 sq mi), with a total population of 1,672,025 during the 2020 census. It was formerly known as the source of the best tobacco in Sichuan and is now well known for its doubanjiang, a type of spicy fermented bean sauce. It was established from the former Pi County by an approval from the State Council on November 24, 2016.

== Geography ==
Pitong, the seat of Pidu, is located 10 kilometers (6.2 mi) from downtown Chengdu. It covers an area of 437.5 square kilometers (168.9 sq mi).

== Demographics ==
Census year	Population
2000	490,314
2010	896,162
2020	1,672,025

== History ==
During the Warring States period, the area of the present Pidu belonged to the ancient kingdom of Shu. In 314 BC, it was conquered by the state of Qin, which organized Pi County two years later in 312 BC.

In the 19th century, the area was famed for the quality of its tobacco, reckoned the best in Sichuan.

It is now seeking to attract electronics and IT corporations and, in 2015, applied for elevation to urban district status.

== Administration ==
The district seat is Pitong Subdistrict. There are 9 subdistricts and 3 towns in the district:

- Pitong Subdistrict (郫筒街道)
- Ande Subdistrict (安德街道)
- Xipu Subdistrict (犀浦街道)
- Hongguang Subdistrict (红光街道)
- Deyuan Subdistrict (德源街道)
- Anjing Subdistrict (安靖街道)
- Tuanjie Subdistrict (团结街道)
- Hezuo Subdistrict (合作街道)
- Xiyuan Subdistrict (西园街道)
- Tangchang Town (唐昌镇)
- Sandaoyan Town (三道堰镇)
- You'ai Town (友爱镇)

== Transport ==
- China National Highway 317
- China National Highway 213

== Climate ==
Climate data for Pidu, elevation 559 m (1,834 ft), (1991–2020 normals, extremes 1981–present)
Month	Jan	Feb	Mar	Apr	May	Jun	Jul	Aug	Sep	Oct	Nov	Dec	Year
Record high °C (°F)	19.8 (67.6)	23.6 (74.5)	30.9 (87.6)	32.4 (90.3)	34.6 (94.3)	35.9 (96.6)	38.4 (101.1)	39.6 (103.3)	35.4 (95.7)	29.3 (84.7)	25.5 (77.9)	18.2 (64.8)	39.6 (103.3)
Mean daily maximum °C (°F)	9.3 (48.7)	12.2 (54.0)	16.9 (62.4)	22.6 (72.7)	26.4 (79.5)	28.4 (83.1)	30.2 (86.4)	30.0 (86.0)	25.7 (78.3)	20.7 (69.3)	16.1 (61.0)	10.7 (51.3)	20.8 (69.4)
Daily mean °C (°F)	5.5 (41.9)	8.1 (46.6)	12.1 (53.8)	17.2 (63.0)	21.1 (70.0)	23.8 (74.8)	25.5 (77.9)	25.0 (77.0)	21.5 (70.7)	17.0 (62.6)	12.2 (54.0)	6.9 (44.4)	16.3 (61.4)
Mean daily minimum °C (°F)	2.8 (37.0)	5.1 (41.2)	8.6 (47.5)	13.1 (55.6)	17.0 (62.6)	20.3 (68.5)	22.1 (71.8)	21.6 (70.9)	18.8 (65.8)	14.6 (58.3)	9.6 (49.3)	4.2 (39.6)	13.2 (55.7)
Record low °C (°F)	−4.1 (24.6)	−3.9 (25.0)	−1.8 (28.8)	3.3 (37.9)	6.3 (43.3)	13.7 (56.7)	16.2 (61.2)	15.7 (60.3)	11.8 (53.2)	2.7 (36.9)	−0.4 (31.3)	−4.5 (23.9)	−4.5 (23.9)
Average precipitation mm (inches)	8.7 (0.34)	10.8 (0.43)	24.8 (0.98)	47.6 (1.87)	79.5 (3.13)	102.5 (4.04)	218.4 (8.60)	218.8 (8.61)	125.1 (4.93)	46.0 (1.81)	17.4 (0.69)	6.3 (0.25)	905.9 (35.68)
Average precipitation days (≥ 0.1 mm)	7.3	7.6	11.8	13.4	14.7	15.6	16.4	15.6	15.9	14.8	8.2	6.3	147.6
Average snowy days	1.5	0.4	0	0	0	0	0	0	0	0	0	0.3	2.2
Average relative humidity (%)	82	79	78	77	75	80	84	85	86	86	84	83	82
Mean monthly sunshine hours	51.5	55.2	86.5	111.1	120.5	107.7	127.8	140.0	71.2	52.1	57.0	53.1	1,033.7
Percentage possible sunshine	16	17	23	29	28	25	30	35	19	15	18	17	23
Source: China Meteorological Administration all-time extreme temperature all-time January highall-time July high
