= Chengdu railway station =

Railway and metro station in Sichuan, China

Coordinates: 30°41′57″N 104°4′15″E

Chengdu 成都
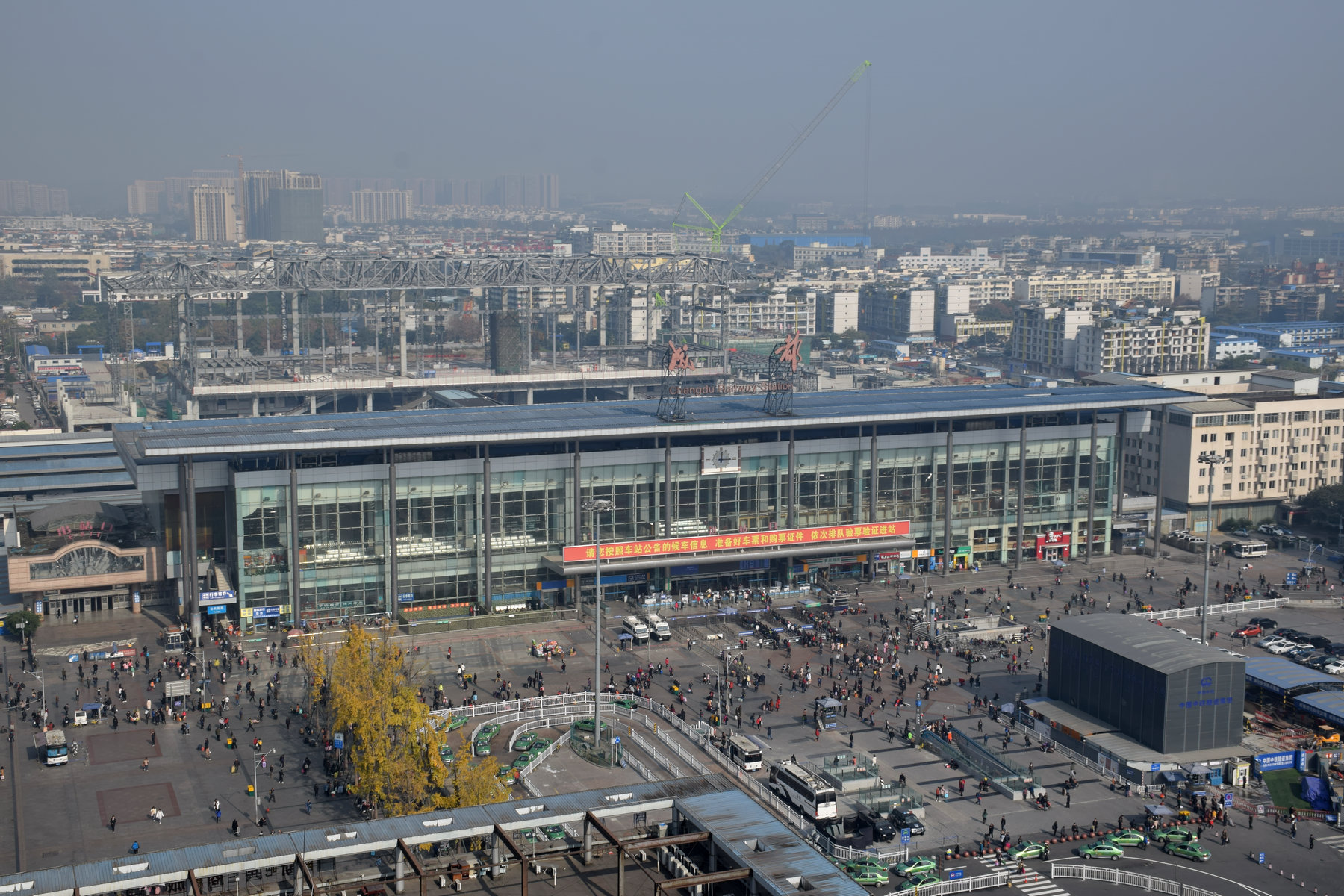
- A view of the Chengdu railway station.

General information
- Location: North Second Ring Road, Jinniu District, Chengdu, Sichuan; China
- Operator: CR Chengdu
- Platforms: 6
- Connections: Bus terminal

Construction
- Structure type: Ground
- Accessible: Yes

History
- Opened: 1 July 1952 (original station); May 2027 (new station)
- Closed: 11 October 2022 (temporarily, due to rebuilding)

Services
Preceding station	China Railway High-speed	Following station
Terminus	Chengdu–Dujiangyan intercity railway	Anjing towards Qingchengshan, Lidui Park or Pengzhou
Preceding station	China Railway	Following station
Terminus	Chengdu–Chongqing railway	Bali towards Chongqing
Terminus	Chengdu–Kunming railway	Bali towards Kunming
Terminus	Chengdu West ring railway	Anjing towards Chengdu South
Tianhuizhen towards Baoji	Baoji–Chengdu railway	Terminus
Bali towards Dazhou	Dazhou–Chengdu railway	Terminus
Location

Chengdu railway station (Chinese: 成都火车站; pinyin: Chéngdū Huǒchē Zhàn) is a major railway station in Chengdu, the capital of Sichuan province. The station is located on North Second Ring Road, Jinniu District, to the North of the city centre. It is operated by China Railway Chengdu Group and is one of the most important hubs of the railway network in China.

== History ==
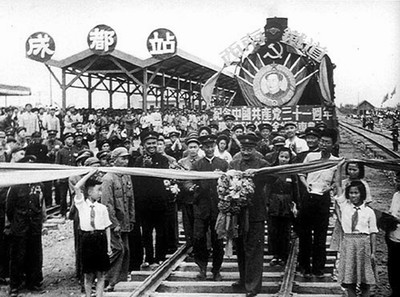
Opening ceremony at Chengdu railway station on July 1, 1952

Opened in 1952, Chengdu railway station is commonly called by locals as "火车北站" (North railway station) for decades to distinguish from Chengdu South railway station opened in 1970, called as "火车南站" (South railway station). And the connecting Chengdu Metro station is called so. However, outsiders may get confused because there is another officially named Chengdu North railway station established in 2007, 17 km (11 mi) north of this station, which is a large freight marshalling area and handles no passengers.

Since 11 October 2022, the station has been closed for refurbishment with passenger services diverted to other stations in Chengdu. It will be served by Chengdu–Chongqing Central line high-speed railway when the renovation is completed.

== Connections ==
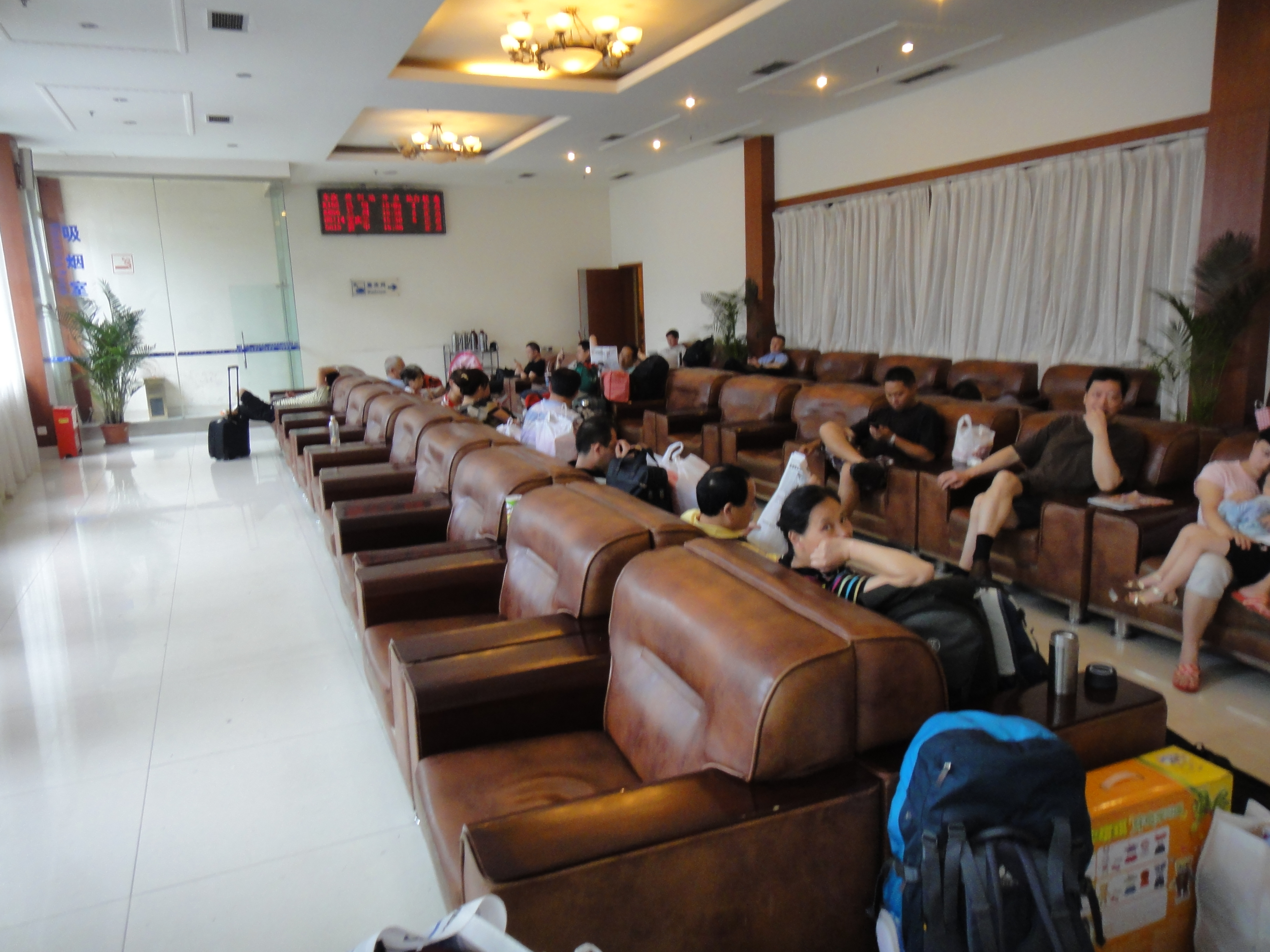
Soft Seat Waiting Area 2

Chengdu railway station is the terminus of the Baoji–Chengdu railway, Chengdu–Chongqing railway, Chengdu–Kunming railway, Chengdu–Dujiangyan high-speed railway, and Dazhou–Chengdu railway.

Chengdu railway station can be reached by taking Chengdu Metro Line 1 and Line 7 and the Chengdu BRT.

== Chengdu Metro ==
North Railway Station 火车北站
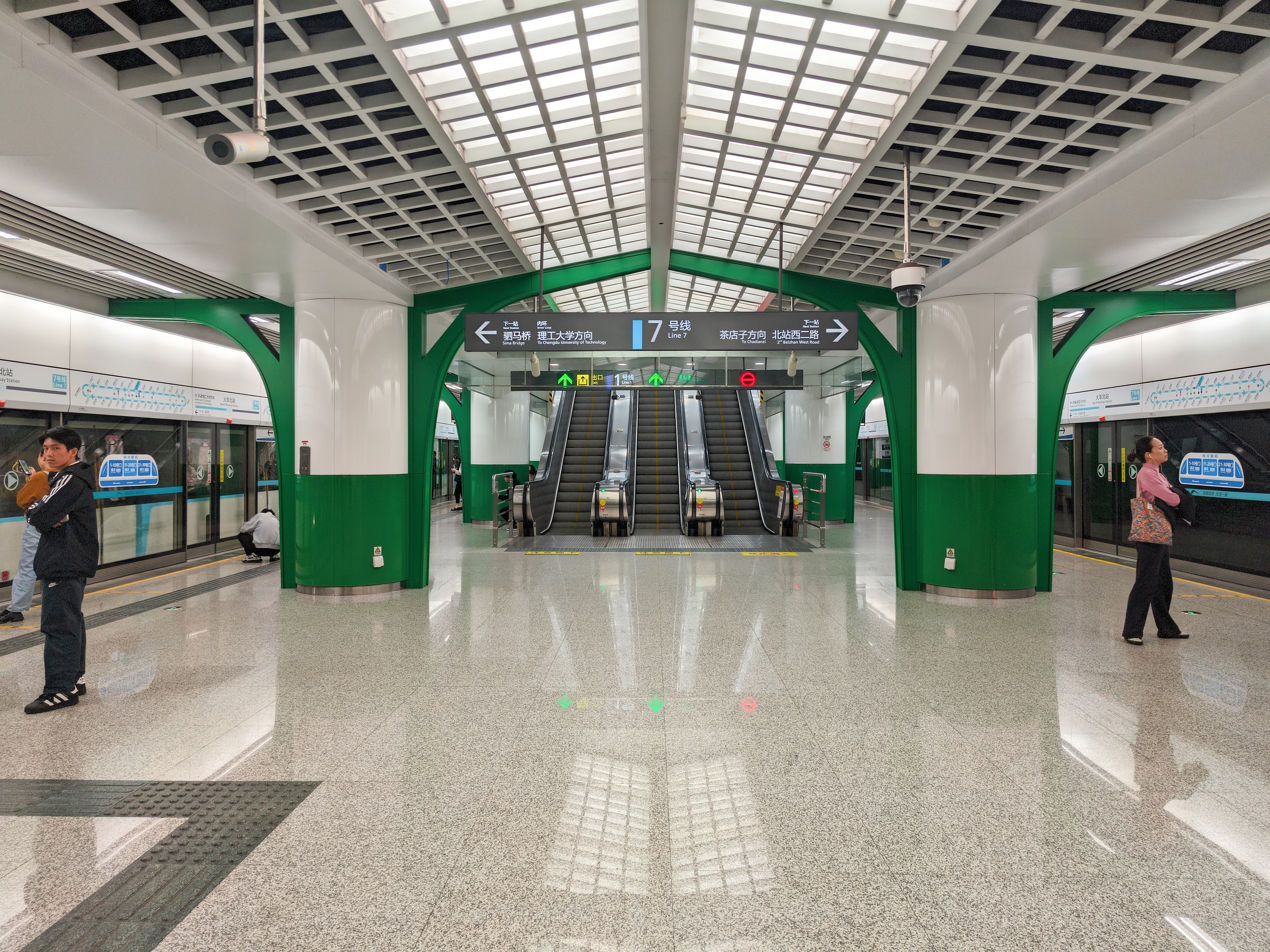

General information
- Location: Jinniu District, Chengdu, Sichuan; China
- Operator: Chengdu Metro Limited
- Lines: Line 1 Line 7
- Platforms: 4 (2 island platforms)

Other information
- Station code: 0103 0701

History
- Opened: 27 September 2010 (Line 1); 6 December 2017 (Line 7)

Services
Preceding station	Chengdu Metro	Following station
Shengxian Lake towards Weijianian	Line 1	Renmin North Road towards Science City or Wugensong
Sima Bridge Clockwise	Line 7	2nd Beizhan West Road Anticlockwise
Location

North Railway Station (Chinese: 火车北站) is a transfer station on Line 1 and Line 7 of the Chengdu Metro. It serves the Chengdu railway station.

=== Gallery ===
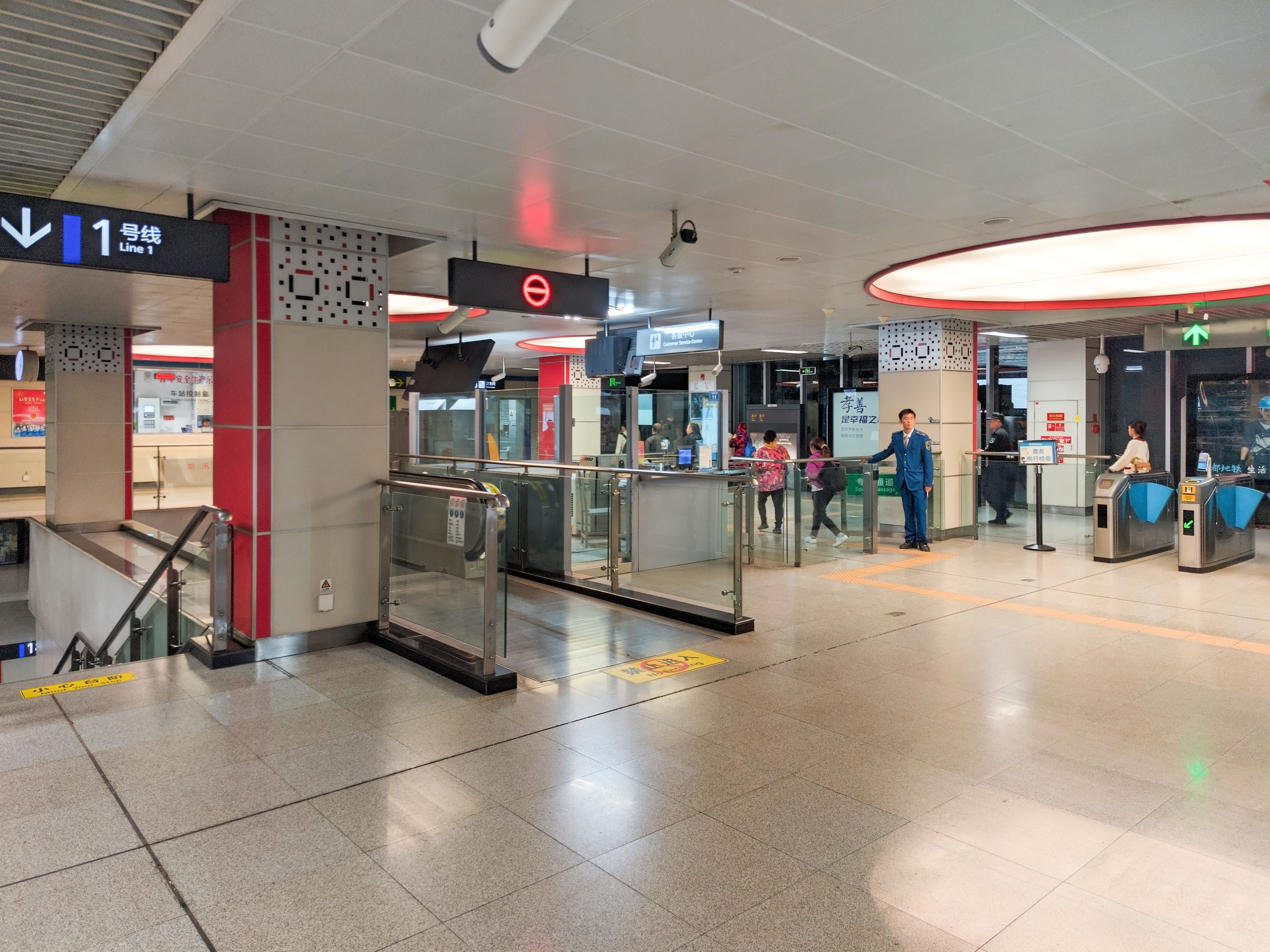
Concourse

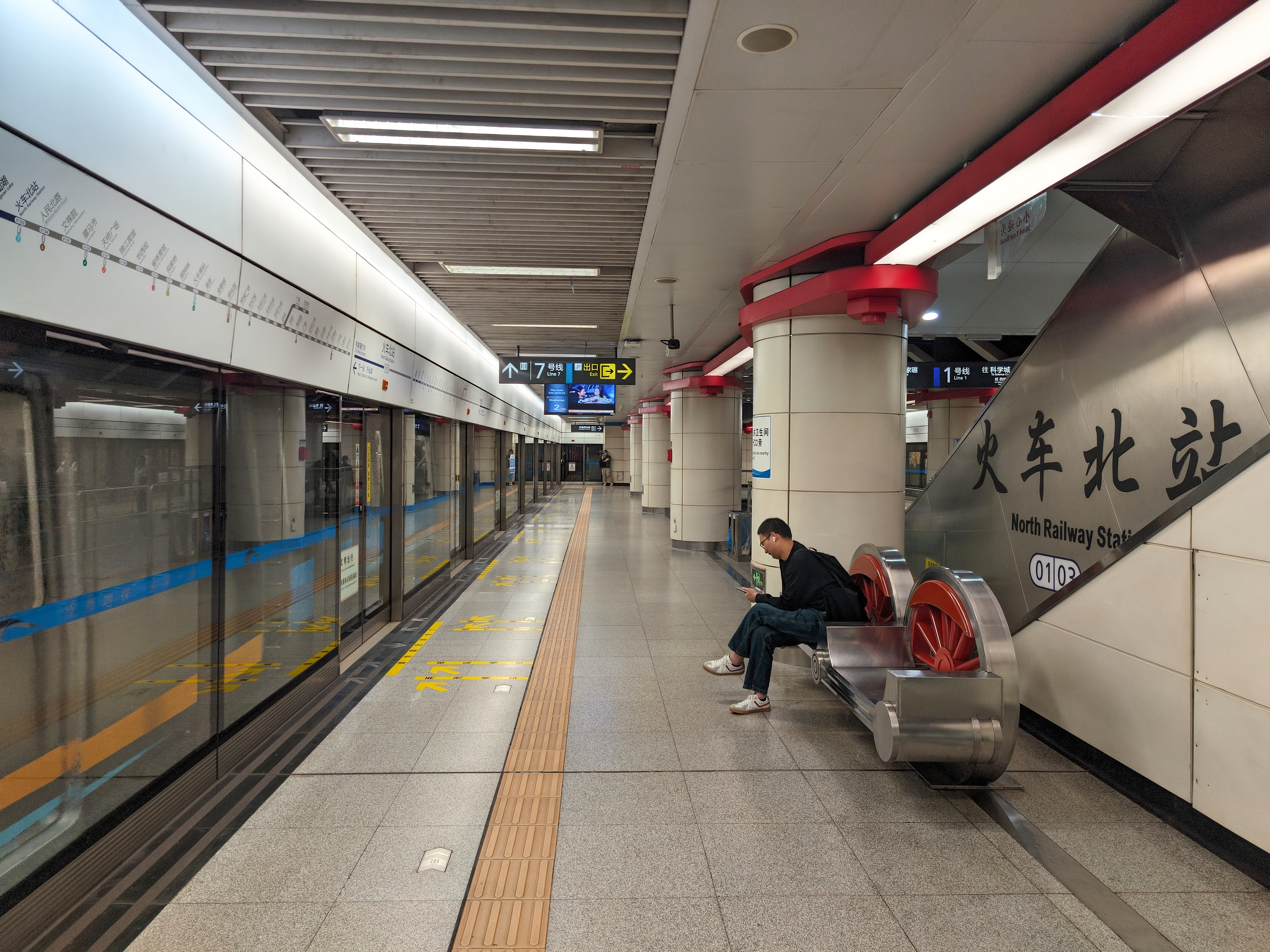
Line 1 platform

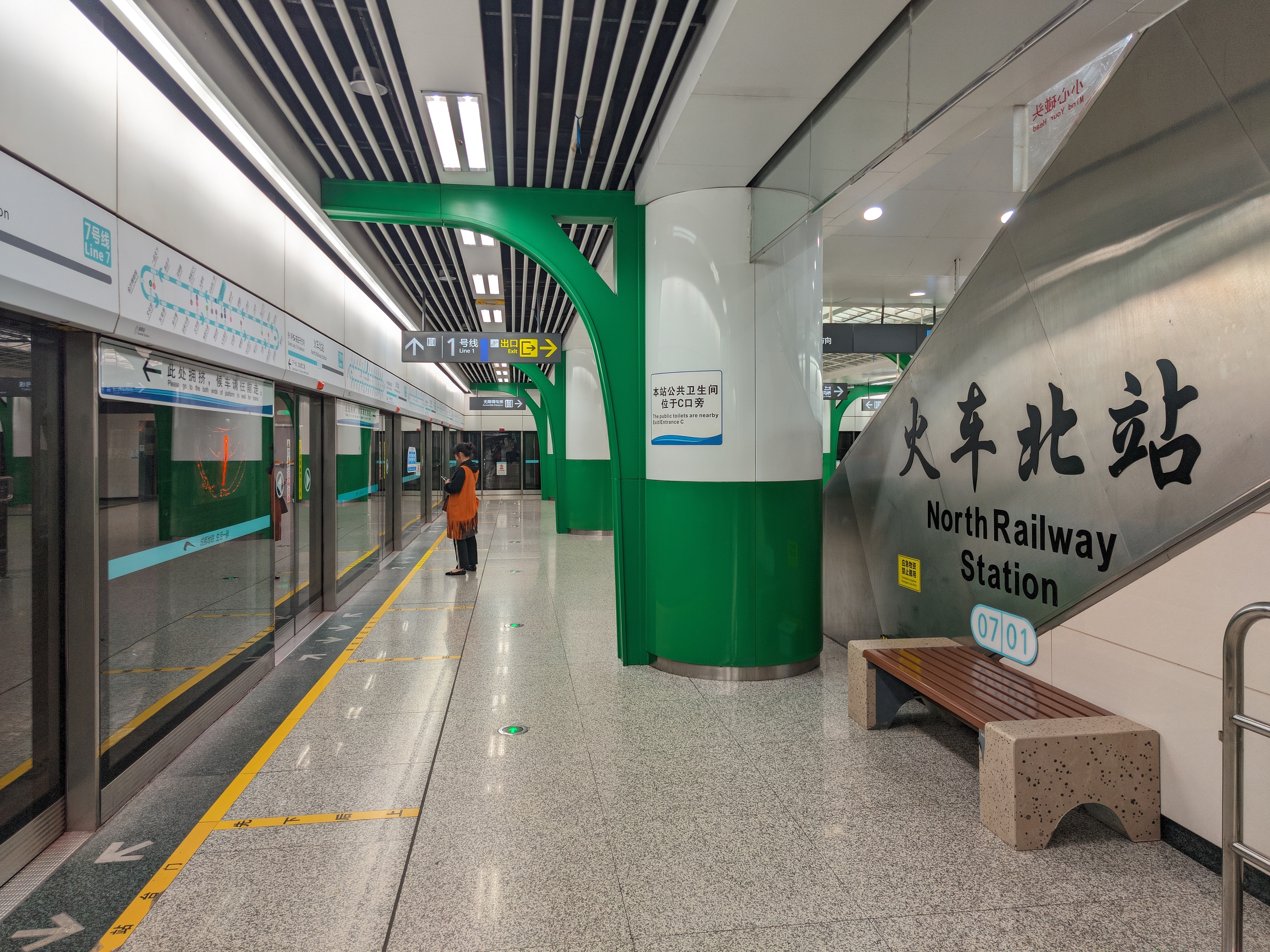
Line 7 platform
