= China Railway Chengdu Group =

Chinese railway operator

China Railway Chengdu Group Co., Ltd.
- Company type: state-owned enterprise
- Industry: Railway operations
- Predecessor: Chengdu Railway Administration
- Founded: 19 November 2017
- Headquarters: 11 N 2nd Section, 1st Ring Road, Jinniu, Chengdu, Sichuan, China
- Area served: Sichuan; Chongqing; Guizhou; Zhaotong, Yunnan
- Owner: Government of China
- Parent: China Railway
- Website: Official Website

China Railway Chengdu Group
- Simplified Chinese: 中国铁路成都局集团
- Traditional Chinese: 中國鐵路成都局集團
Transcriptions
Standard Mandarin
- Hanyu Pinyin: Zhōngguó Tiělù Chéngdū Jú Jítuán

Chengdu Railway Administration
- Simplified Chinese: 成都铁路局
- Traditional Chinese: 成都鐵路局
Transcriptions
Standard Mandarin
- Hanyu Pinyin: Chéngdū Tiělù Jú

CR Chengdu
- Simplified Chinese: 成铁
- Traditional Chinese: 成鐵
Transcriptions
Standard Mandarin
- Hanyu Pinyin: Chéngtiě

China Railway Chengdu Group, officially abbreviated as CR Chengdu or CR-Chengdu, formerly, Chengdu Railway Administration is a subsidiary group under the umbrella of the China Railway Group (formerly the Ministry of Railway). The railway administration was reorganized as a company in November 2017.

It is in responsible for the 9 primary railway routes, with operating length of 4,457.8 kilometers. It oversees the railway networks in Sichuan, Chongqing, Guizhou, although the portion of Nanning-Kunming railway in Guizhou is managed by the China Railway Kunming Group.

== Hub stations ==
- Chengdu
  - Chengdu, Chengdu East, Chengdu North
- Chongqing
  - Chongqing, Chongqing North, Chongqing West, Shapingba
- Guiyang
  - Guiyang, Guiyang North

== Regional services ==
=== C-train services ===
- Chengguan
- Chengpu
- Guikai
- Guiyang Loop Line
- Yuwan
