= Shuhan Road East station =

Metro station in Chengdu, China

Shuhan Road East 蜀汉路东
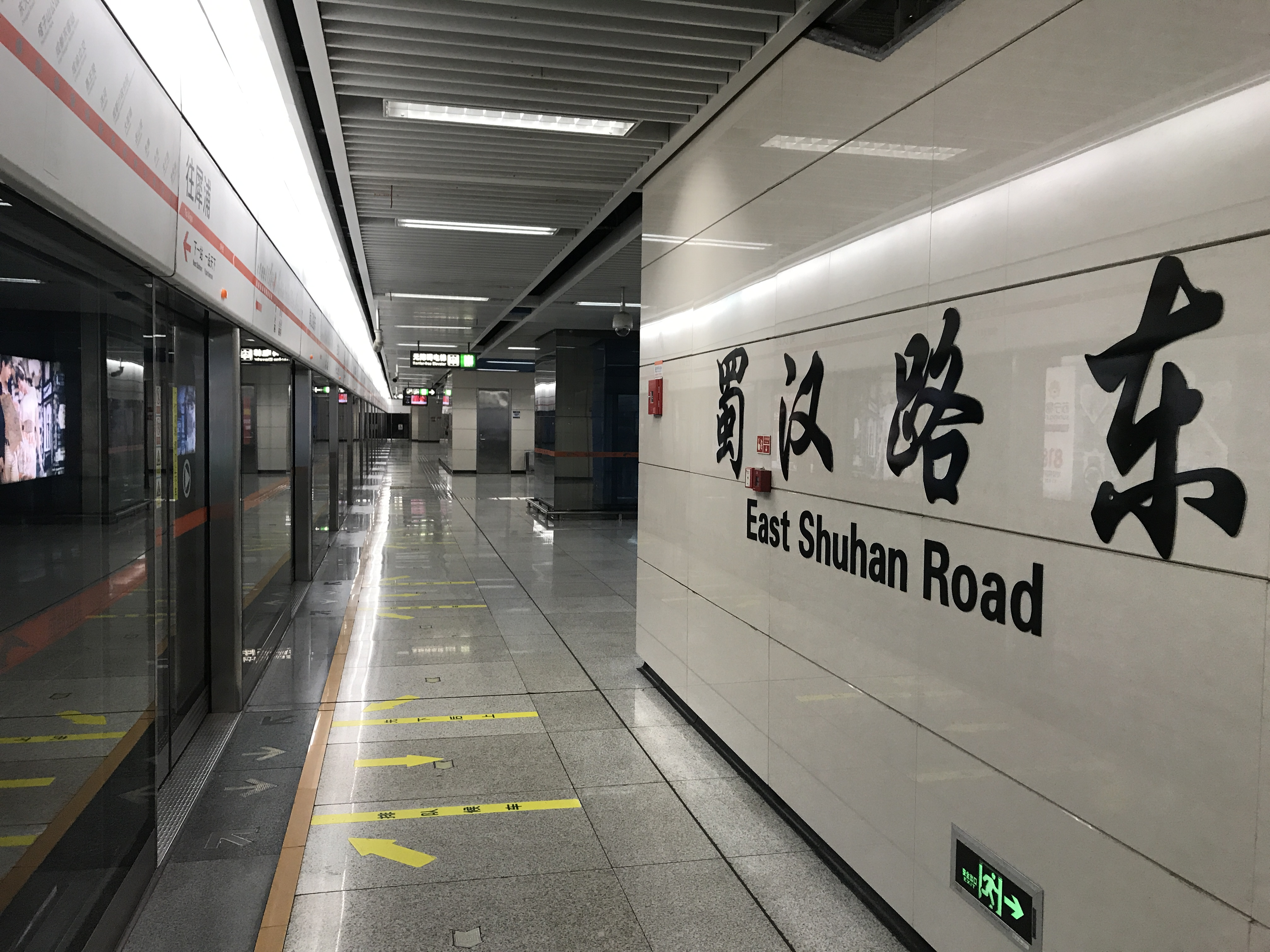

General information
- Location: Jinniu District, Chengdu, Sichuan; China
- Coordinates: 30.6850862°N 104.0271176°E
- Operated by: Chengdu Metro Limited
- Line: Line 2
- Platforms: 2 (1 island platform)

Other information
- Station code: 0223

History
- Opened: 16 September 2012
- Previous names: East Shuhan Road

Services
Preceding station	Chengdu Metro	Following station
Baiguolin towards Longquanyi	Line 2	Yipintianxia towards Xipu Railway Station
Location

Shuhan Road East (Chinese: 蜀汉路东), formerly known as East Shuhan Road, is a station on Line 2 of the Chengdu Metro in China.

== Station layout ==
G	Entrances and Exits	Exits A, C, E, F
B1	Concourse	Faregates, Station Agent
B2	Westbound	← Line 2 towards Xipu (Yipintianxia)
B2	Island platform, doors open on the left
B2	Eastbound	Line 2 towards Longquanyi (Baiguolin) →

== Gallery ==
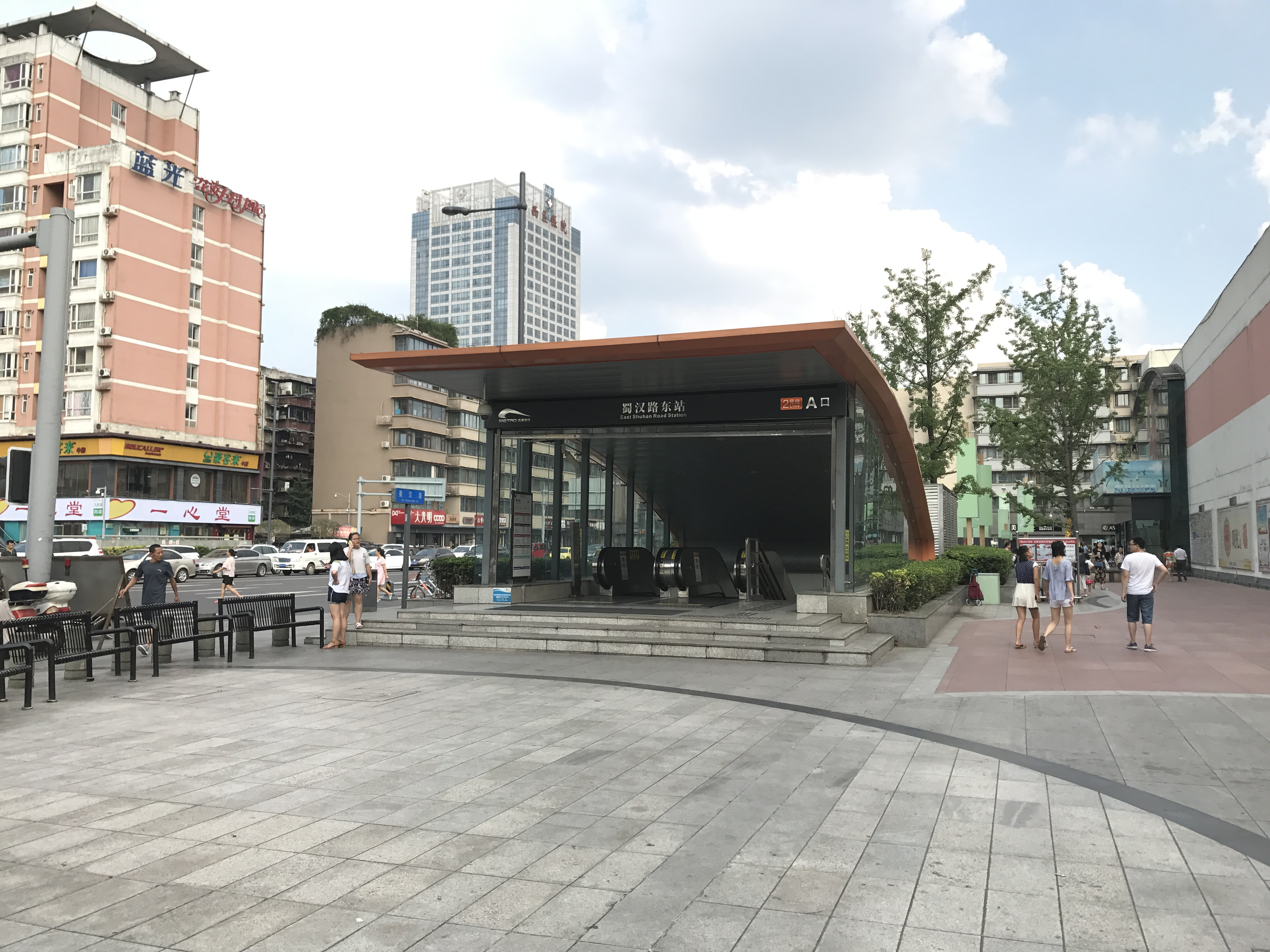
Entrance A

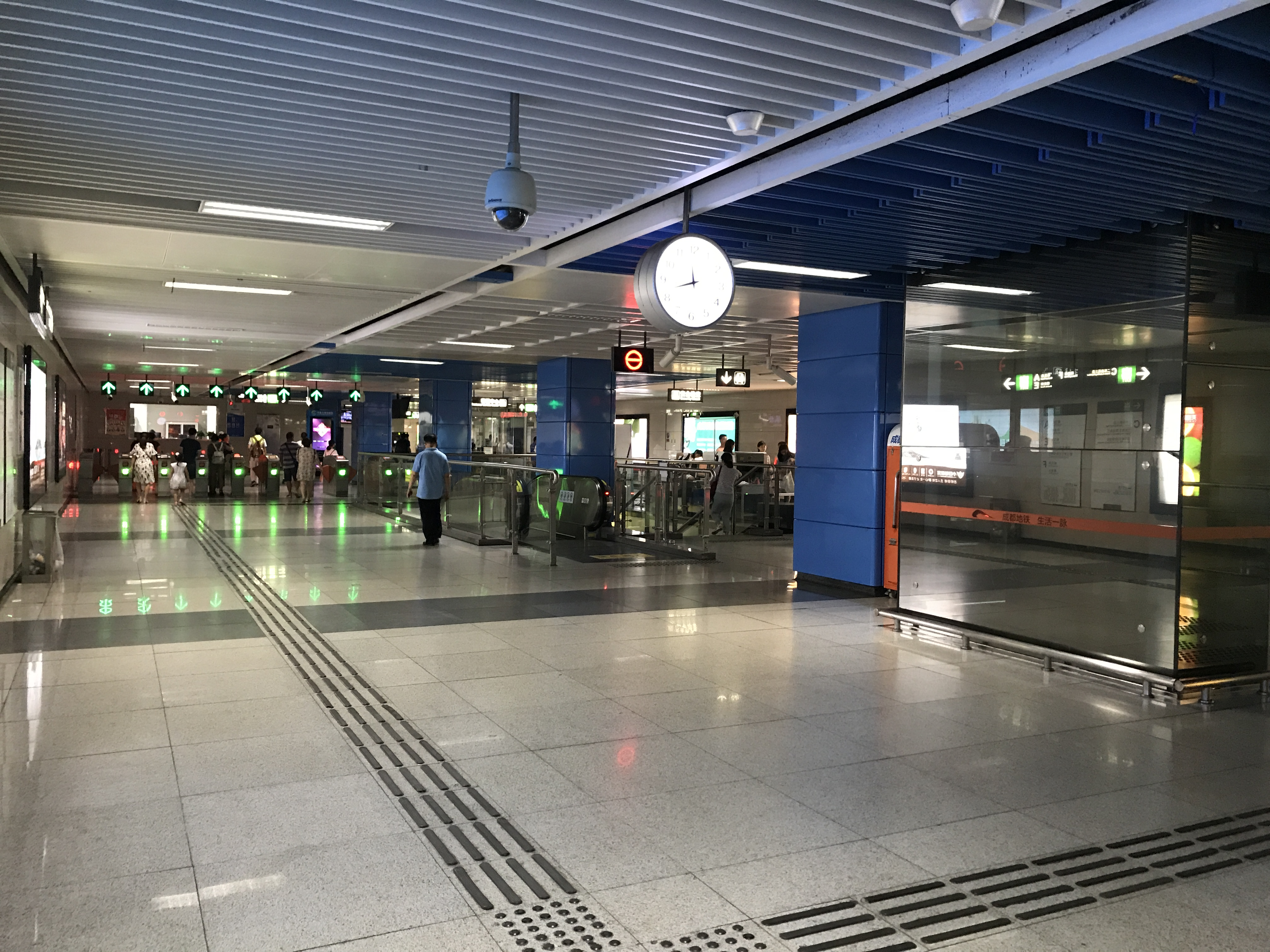
Concourse

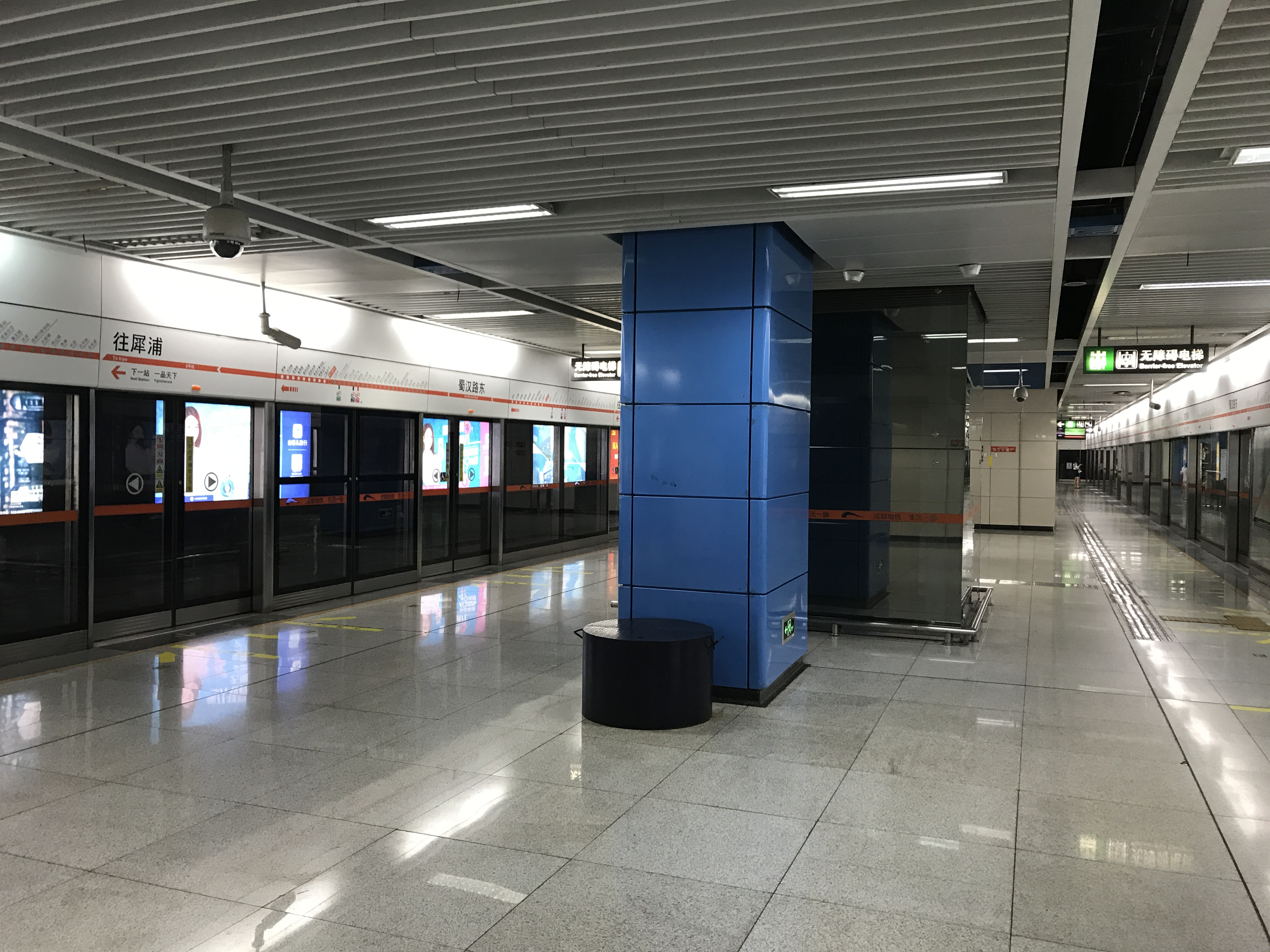
Platform
