= Chengdu University of TCM & Sichuan Provincial People's Hospital station =

Metro station in Chengdu, China

Chengdu University of TCM & Sichuan Provincial People's Hospital 中医大·省医院
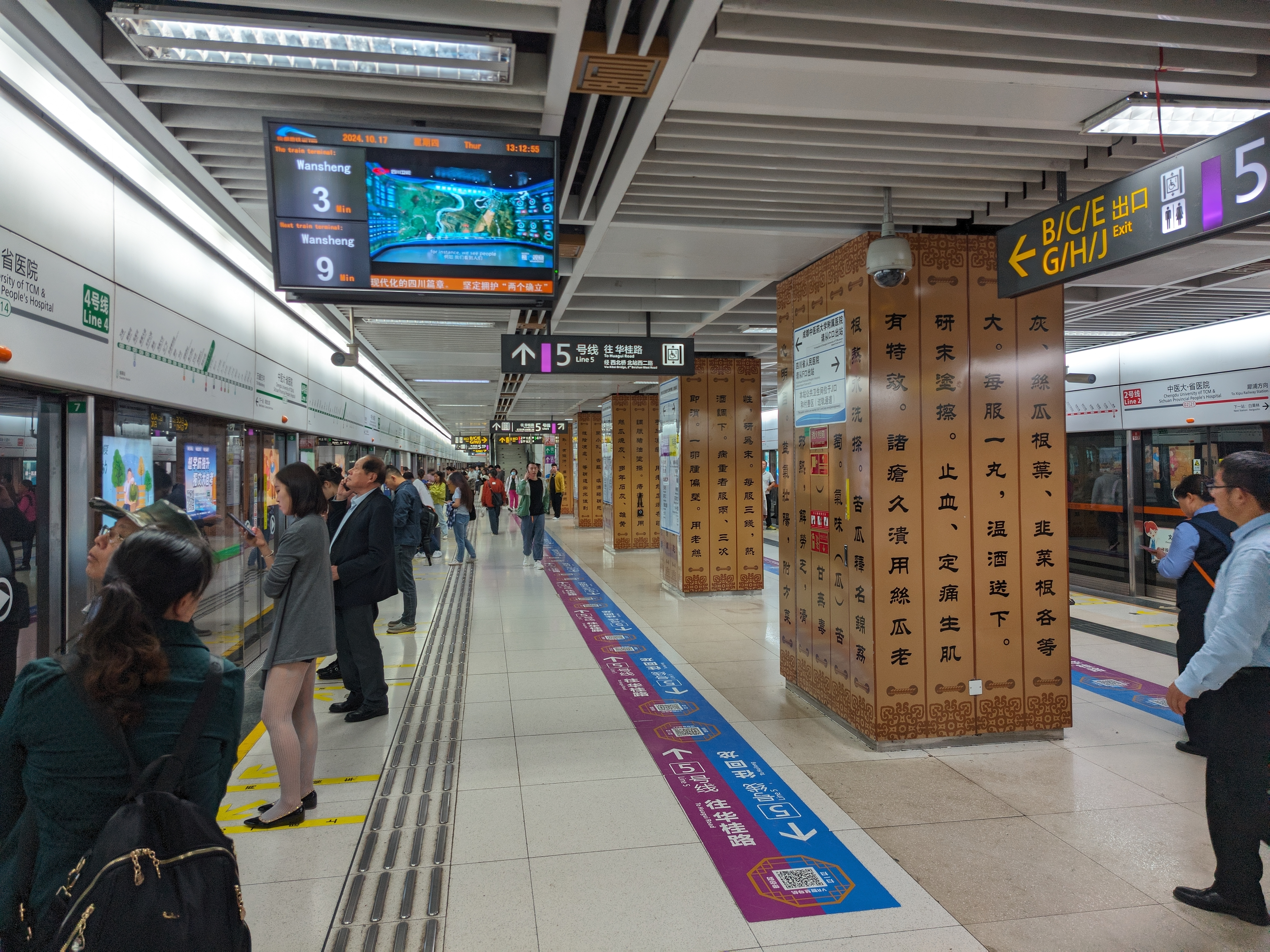
- Cross-platform interchange for Line 2 (towards Xipu Railway Station) and Line 4 (towards Wansheng).

General information
- Location: Qingyang District, Chengdu, Sichuan; China
- Coordinates: 30.66872°N 104.03819°E
- Operated by: Chengdu Metro Limited
- Lines: Line 2 Line 4 Line 5
- Platforms: 6 (2 island platforms, 2 side platforms)

Other information
- Station code: 0221 0414 0521

History
- Opened: 16 September 2012

Services
| Preceding station | Chengdu Metro | Following station |
|---|---|---|
| Tonghuimen towards Longquanyi | Line 2 | Baiguolin towards Xipu Railway Station |
| Caotang North Road towards Wansheng | Line 4 | Kuanzhaixiangzi Alleys towards Xihe |
| Fuqin towards Huagui Road | Line 5 | Qingyang Taoist Temple towards Huilong |
Location

Chengdu University of TCM & Sichuan Provincial People's Hospital station (Chinese: 中医大·省医院站; pinyin: Zhōngyīdà Shěngyīyuàn zhàn) is a transfer station on Line 2, Line 4 and Line 5 of the Chengdu Metro in China, providing cross-platform interchange between Line 2 and 4. The station is named after Chengdu University of Traditional Chinese Medicine (中医大, Zhōngyīdà) and Sichuan Provincial People's Hospital (省医院, Shěngyīyuàn).

== Gallery ==
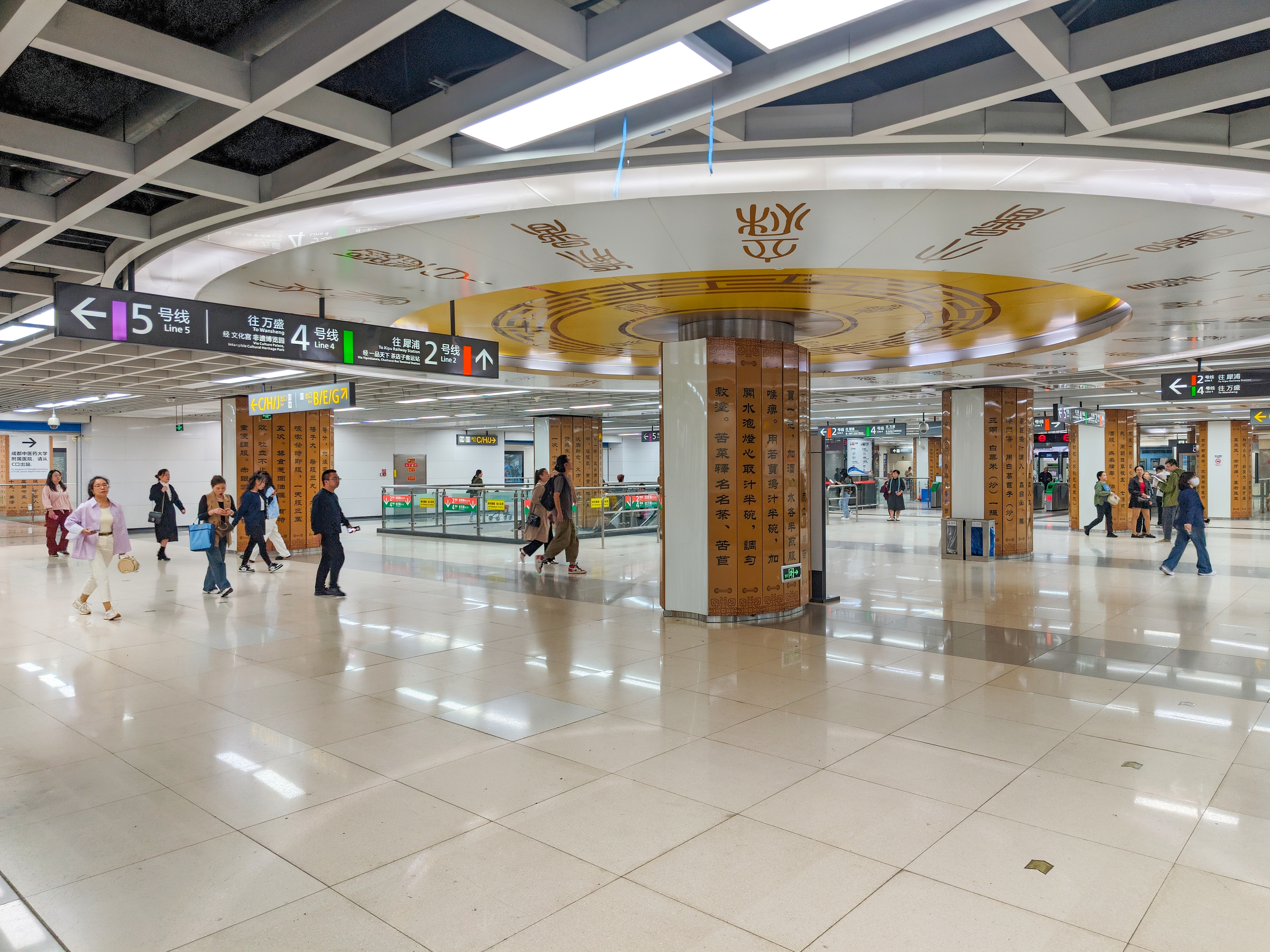
East concourse

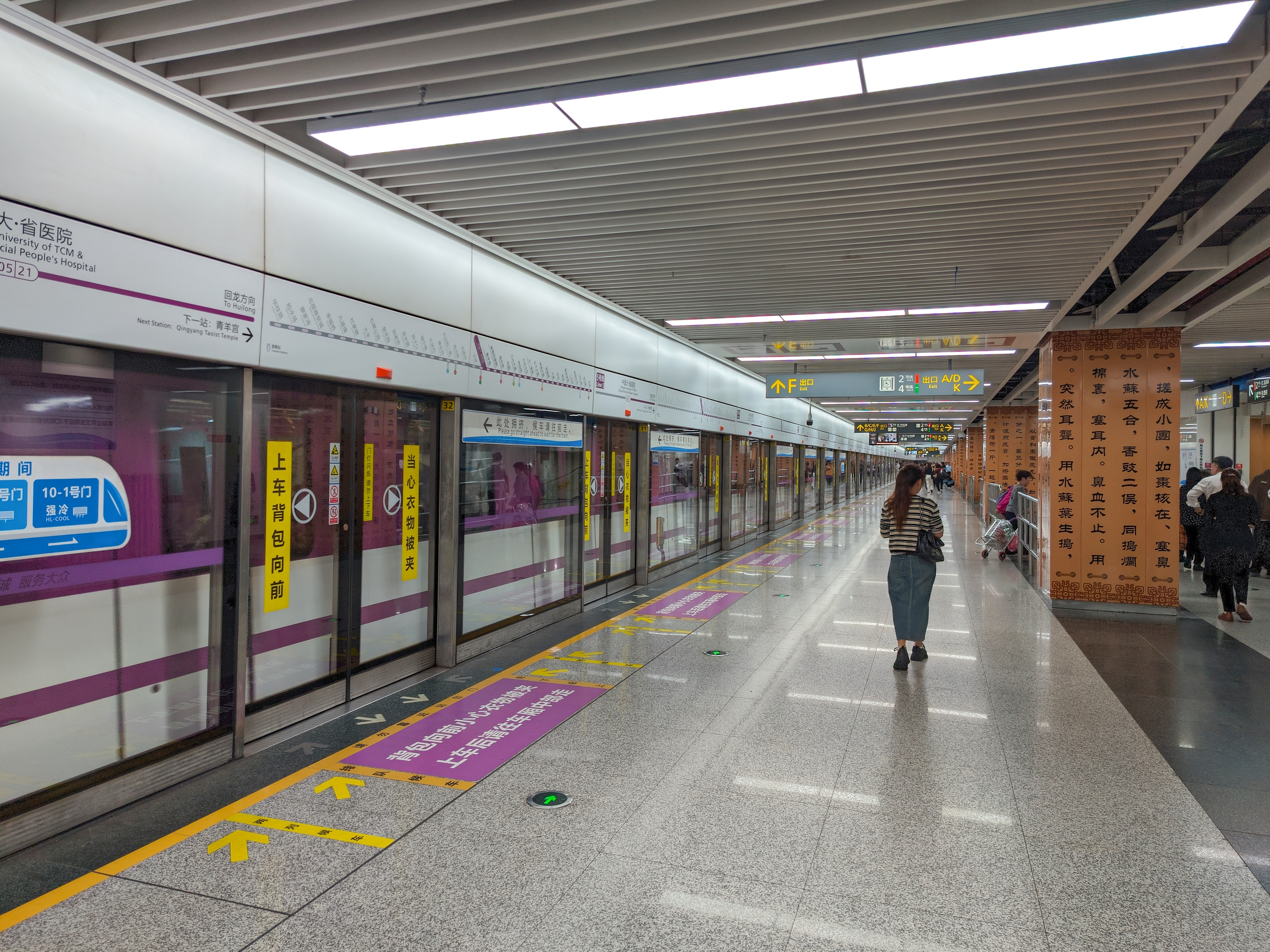
Platform for Line 5 towards Huilong

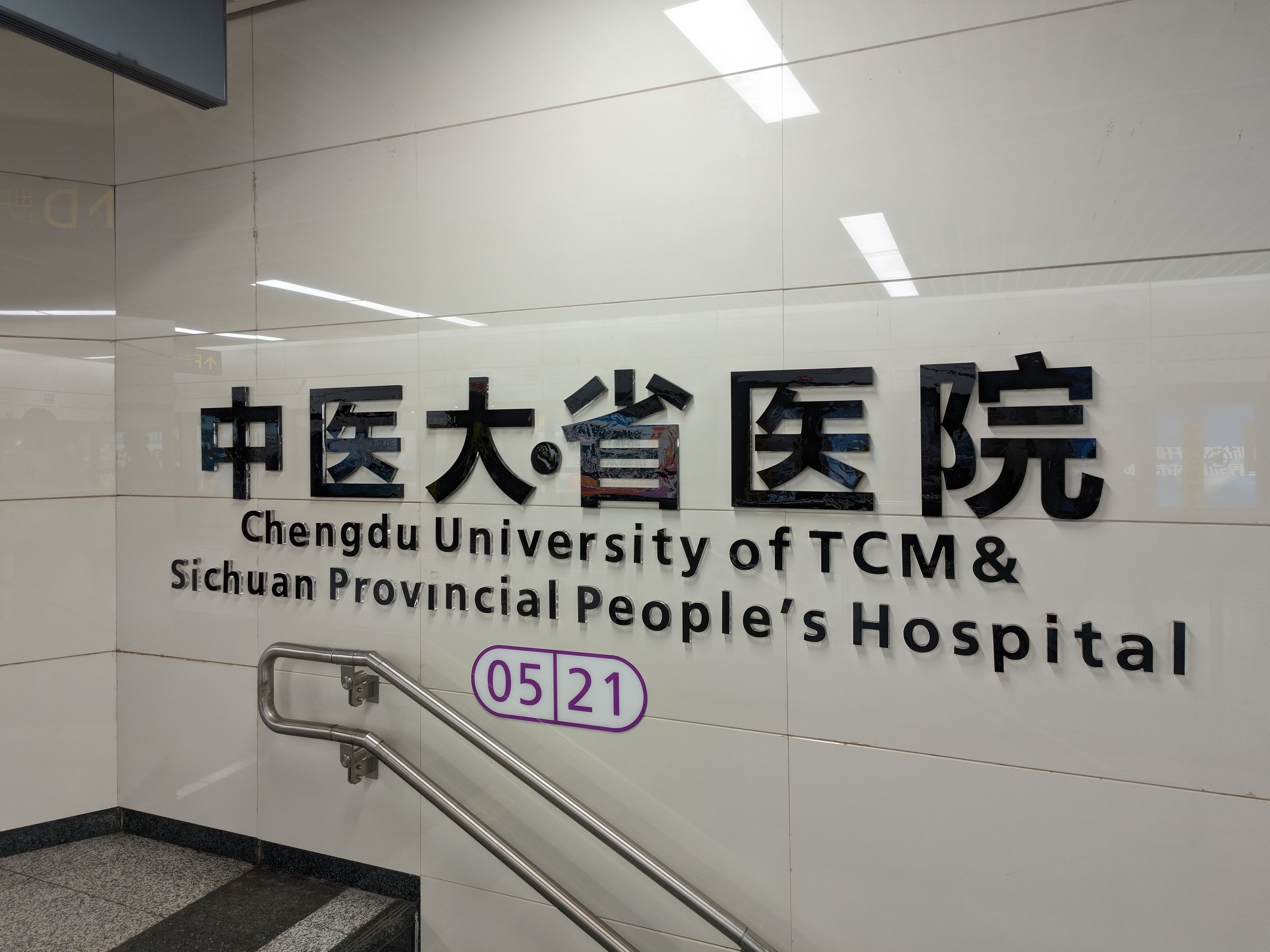
Station name on Line 5 Platform
