= Baiguolin station =

Metro station in Chengdu, China

Baiguolin 白果林
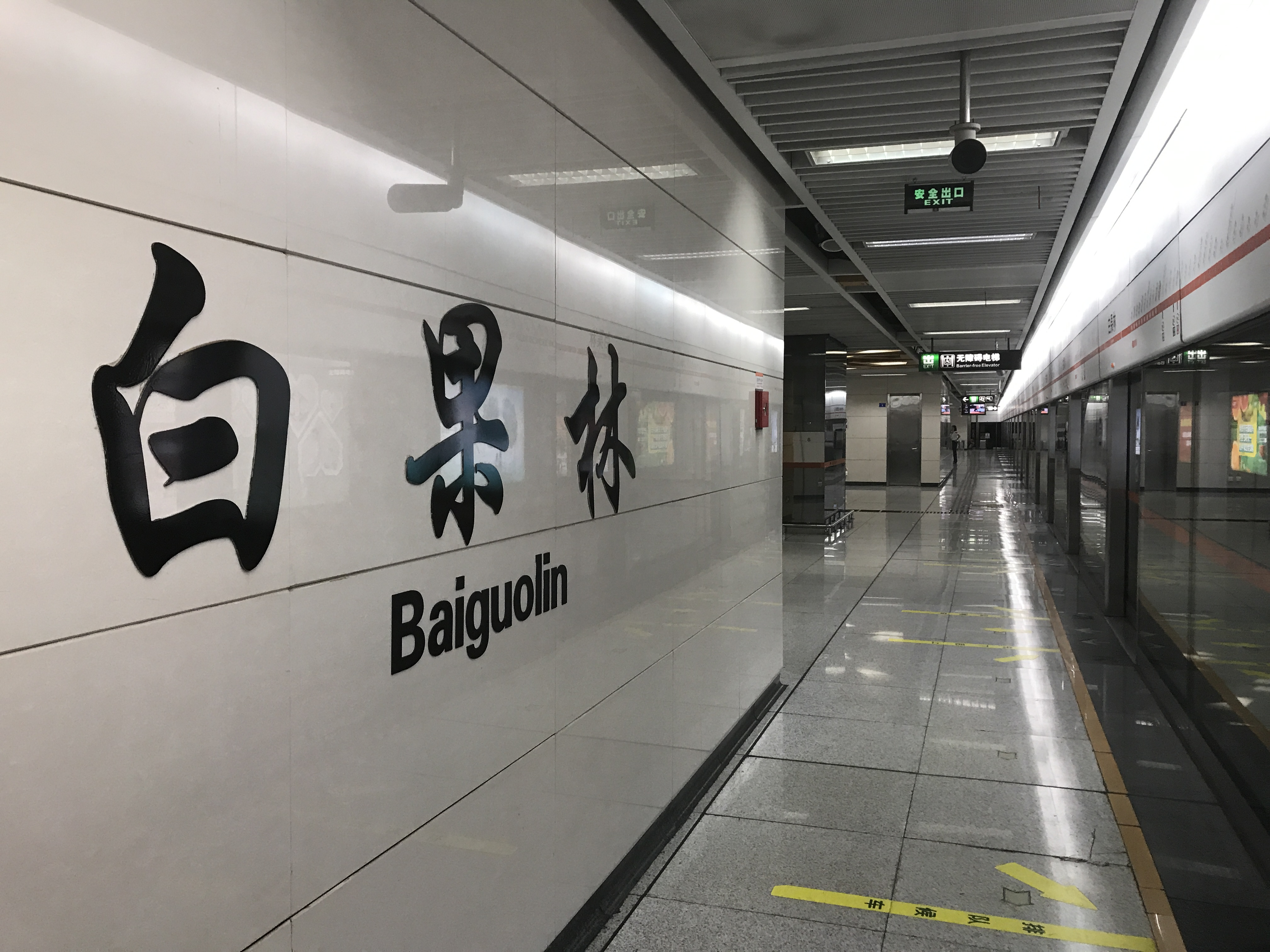

General information
- Location: Jinniu District, Chengdu, Sichuan; China
- Coordinates: 30°40′32″N 104°2′15″E
- Operated by: Chengdu Metro Limited
- Line(s): Line 2
- Platforms: 2 (1 island platform)

Other information
- Station code: 0222

History
- Opened: 16 September 2012

Services
Preceding station	Chengdu Metro	Following station
Chengdu University of TCM & Sichuan Provincial People's Hospital towards Longquanyi	Line 2	Shuhan Road East towards Xipu Railway Station

Baiguolin (Chinese: 白果林) is a station on Line 2 of the Chengdu Metro in China.

== Station layout ==
G	Entrances and Exits	Exits C, D
B1	Concourse	Faregates, Station Agent
B2	Westbound	← Line 2 towards Xipu Railway Station (Shuhan Road East)
B2	Island platform, doors open on the left
B2	Eastbound	Line 2 towards Longquanyi (Chengdu University of TCM & Sichuan Provincial People's Hospital) →

== Gallery ==
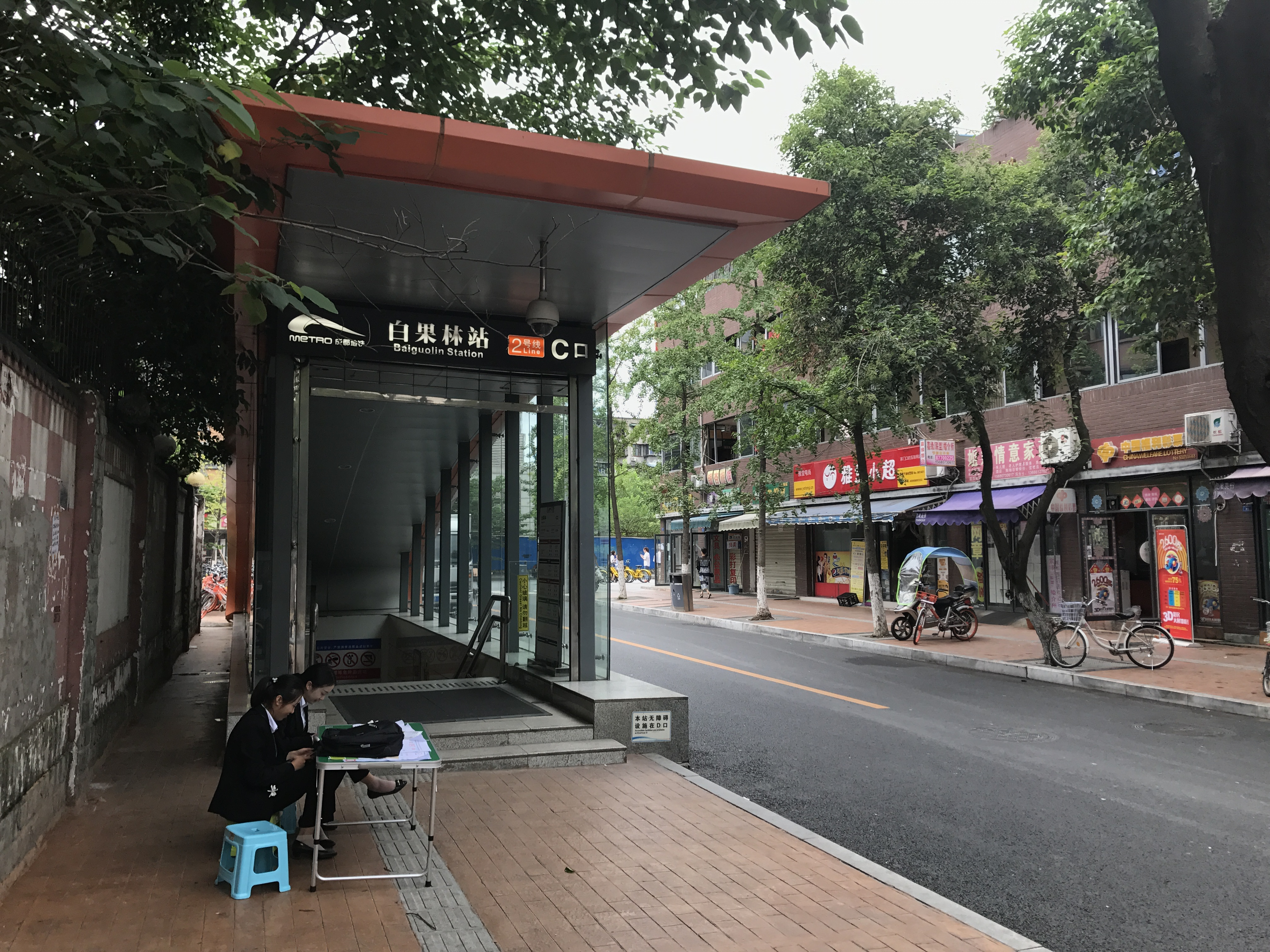
Entrance C

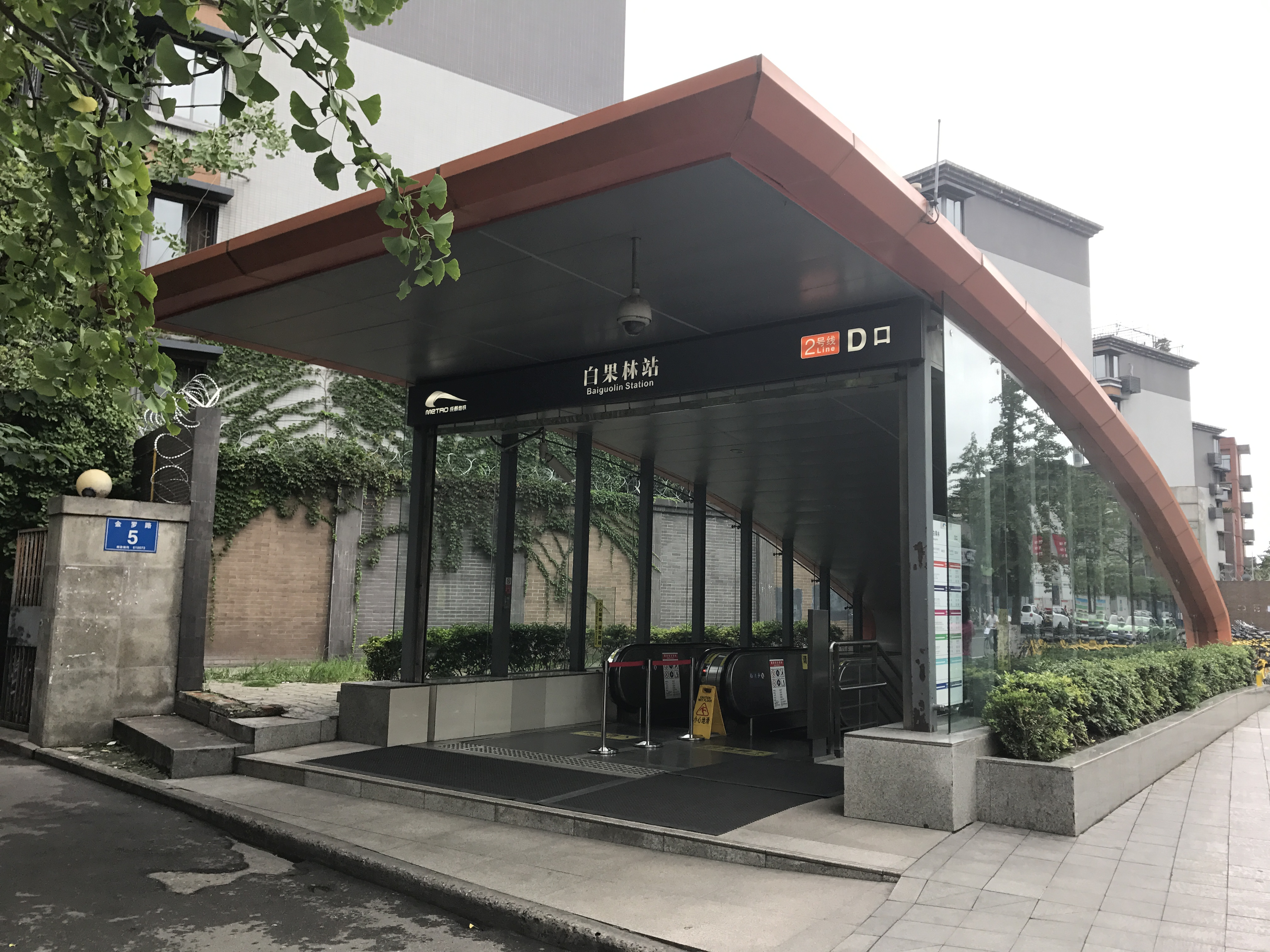
Entrance D

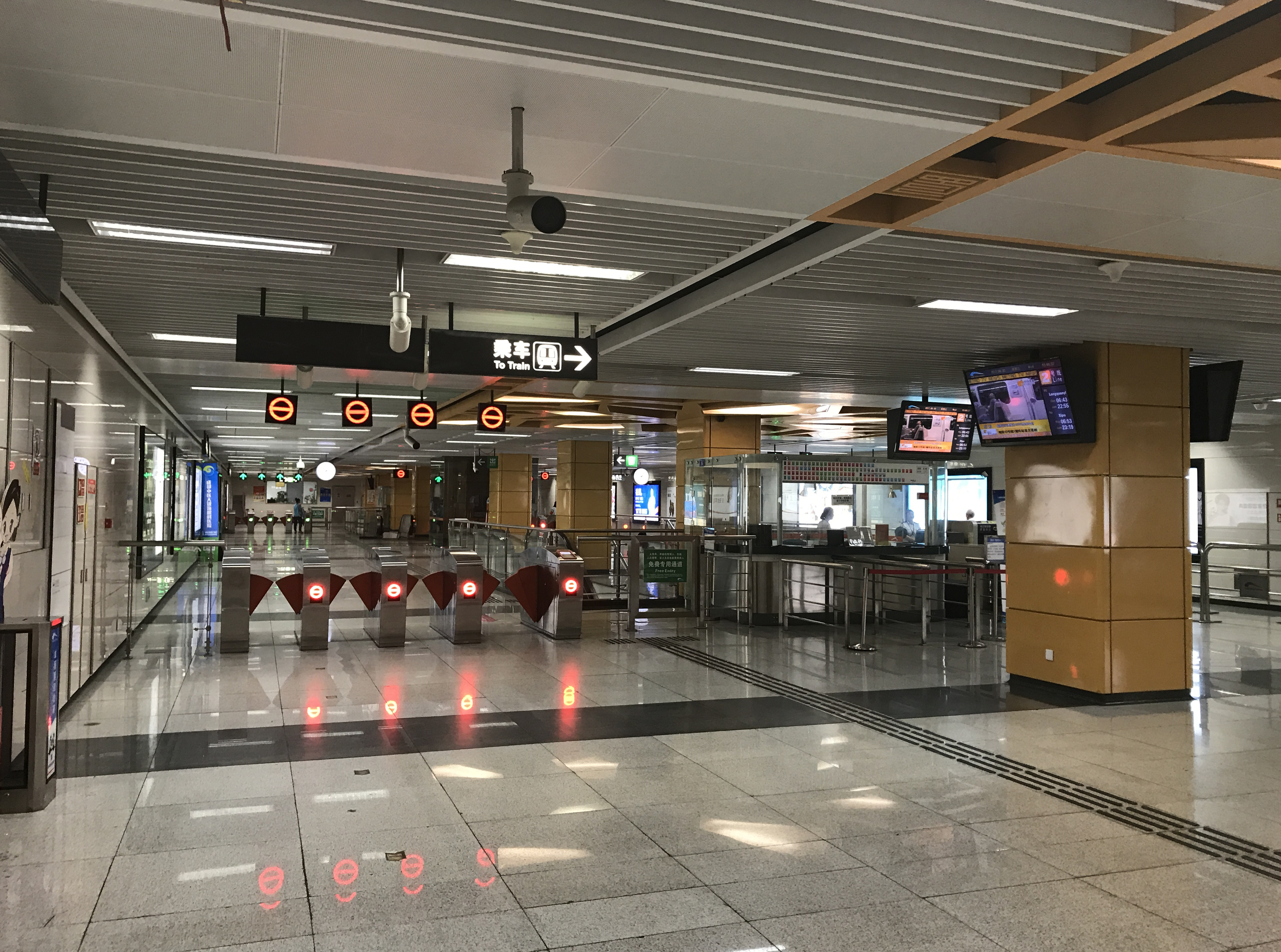
Concourse

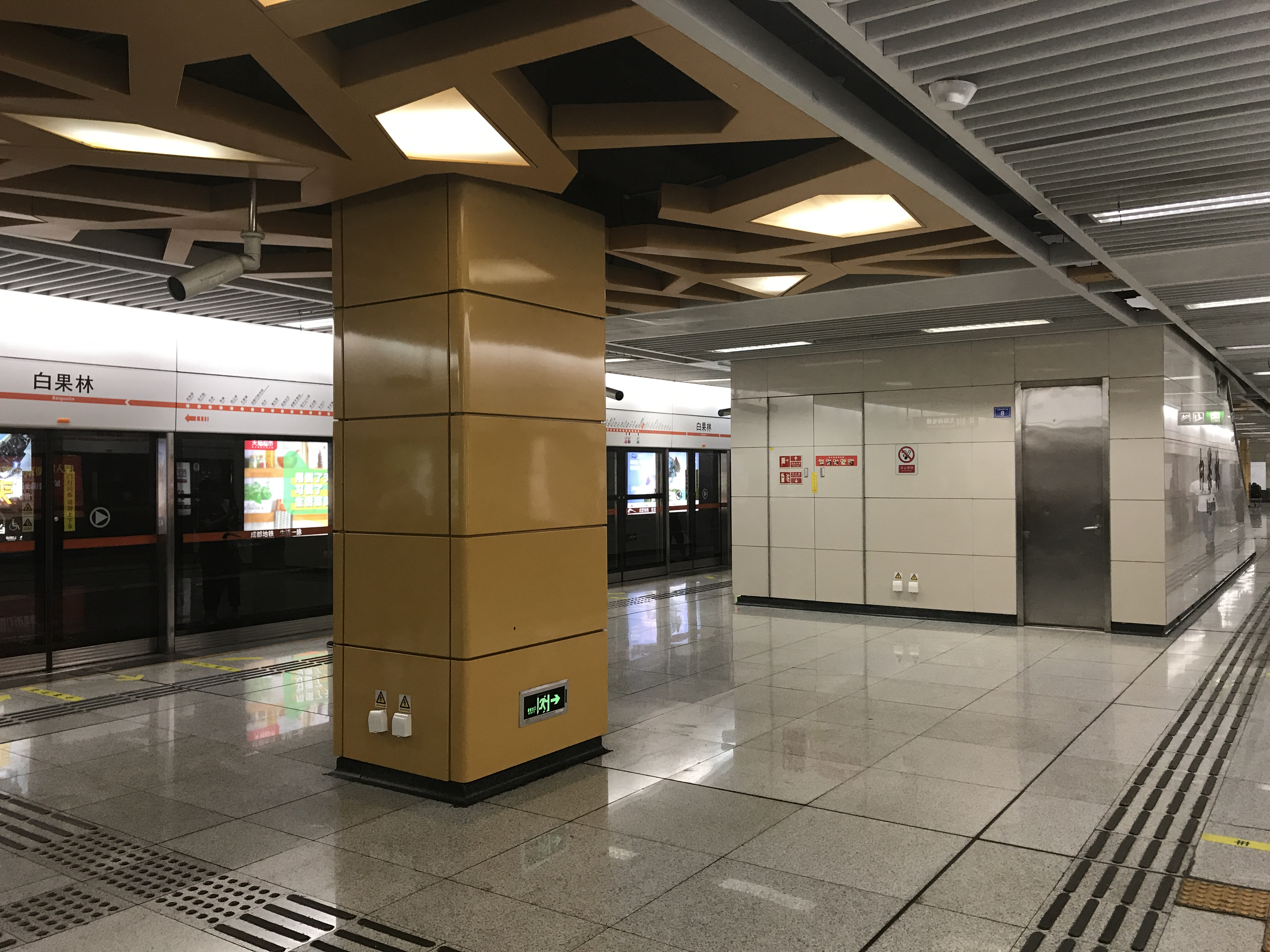
Platform
