= People's Park station (Chengdu Metro) =

Metro station in Chengdu, China

People's Park 人民公园
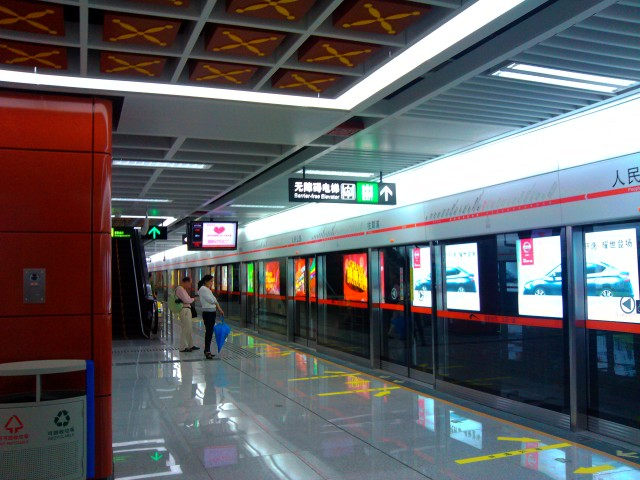
- Line 2 platform

General information
- Location: Qingyang District, Chengdu, Sichuan; China
- Coordinates: 30.6618826°N 104.0541094°E
- Operated by: Chengdu Metro Limited
- Lines: Line 2 Line 17
- Platforms: 4 (2 island platforms)

Other information
- Station code: 0219 1712

History
- Opened: 16 September 2012 (Line 2); 17 September 2025 (Line 17)

Services
Preceding station	Chengdu Metro	Following station
Tianfu Square towards Longquanyi	Line 2	Tonghuimen towards Xipu Railway Station
Xiaonan Street towards Jiujiang North	Line 17	Xidajie Street towards Gaohong
Location

People's Park station (Chinese: 人民公园站; pinyin: Rénmín Gōngyuán zhàn) is a station on Line 2 and Line 17 of the Chengdu Metro in China. It is located at the northwest corner of People's Park in Qingyang District, Chengdu.

== Station layout ==
G	Entrances and Exits	Exits B, D, F, G, H, J
B1	Concourse	Faregates, Station Agent
B2	Westbound	← Line 2 towards Xipu (Tonghuimen)
B2	Island platform, doors open on the left
B2	Eastbound	Line 2 towards Longquanyi (Tianfu Square) →
B4	Westbound	← Line 17 to Jiujiang North (Xiaonan Street)
B4	Island platform, doors open on the left
B4	Eastbound	Line 17 to Gaohong (Xidajie Street) →

== Gallery ==
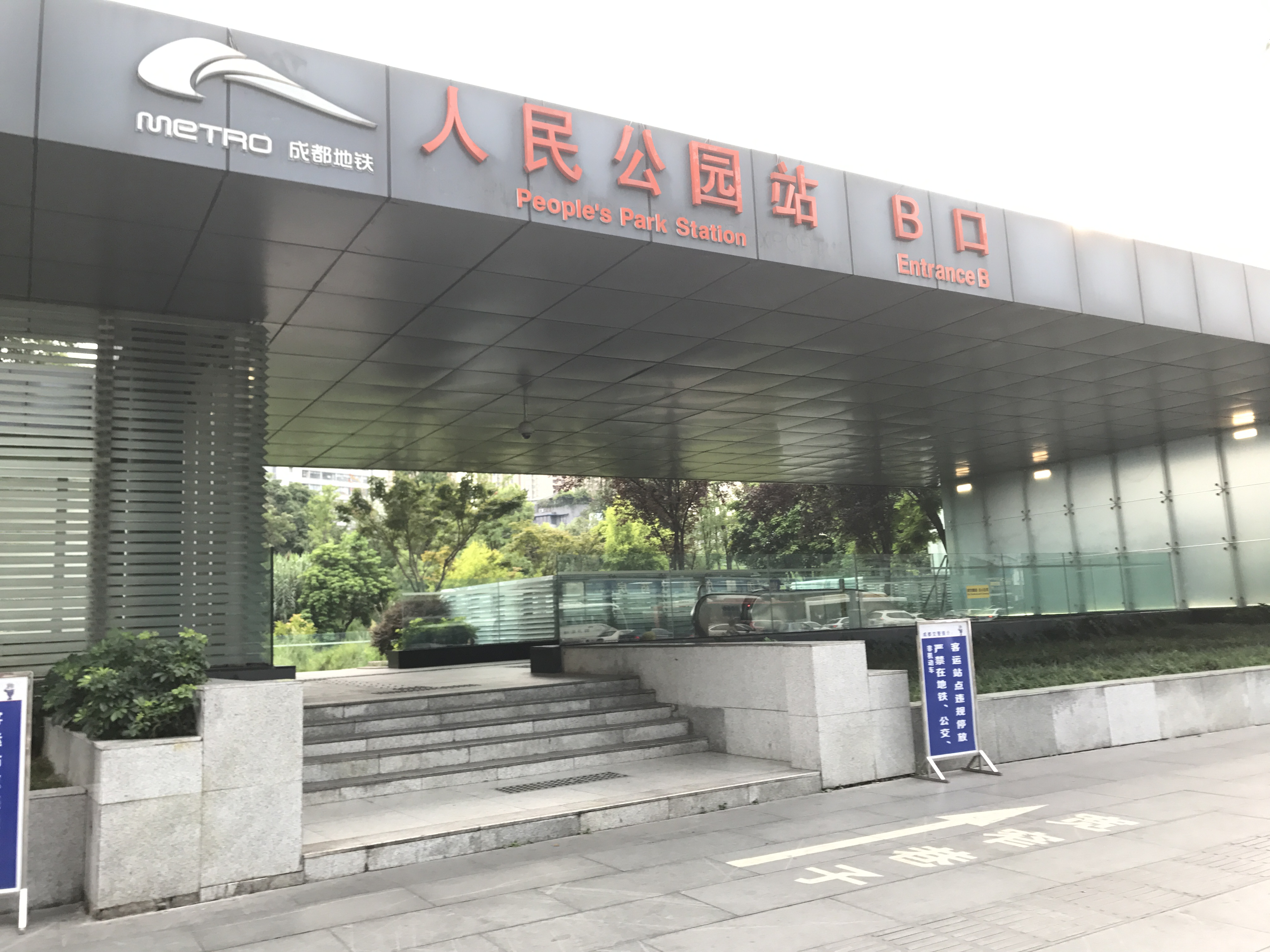
Entrance B

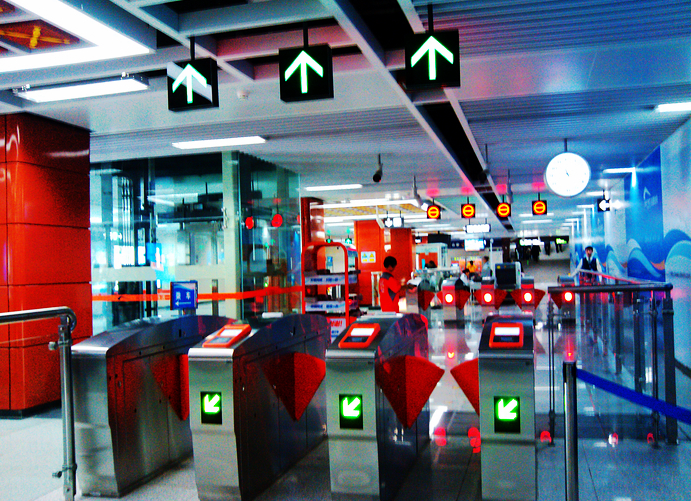
Line 2 Concourse
