= Yipintianxia station =

Chengdu Metro station

Coordinates: 30.6911°N 104.0180°E

Yipintianxia 一品天下
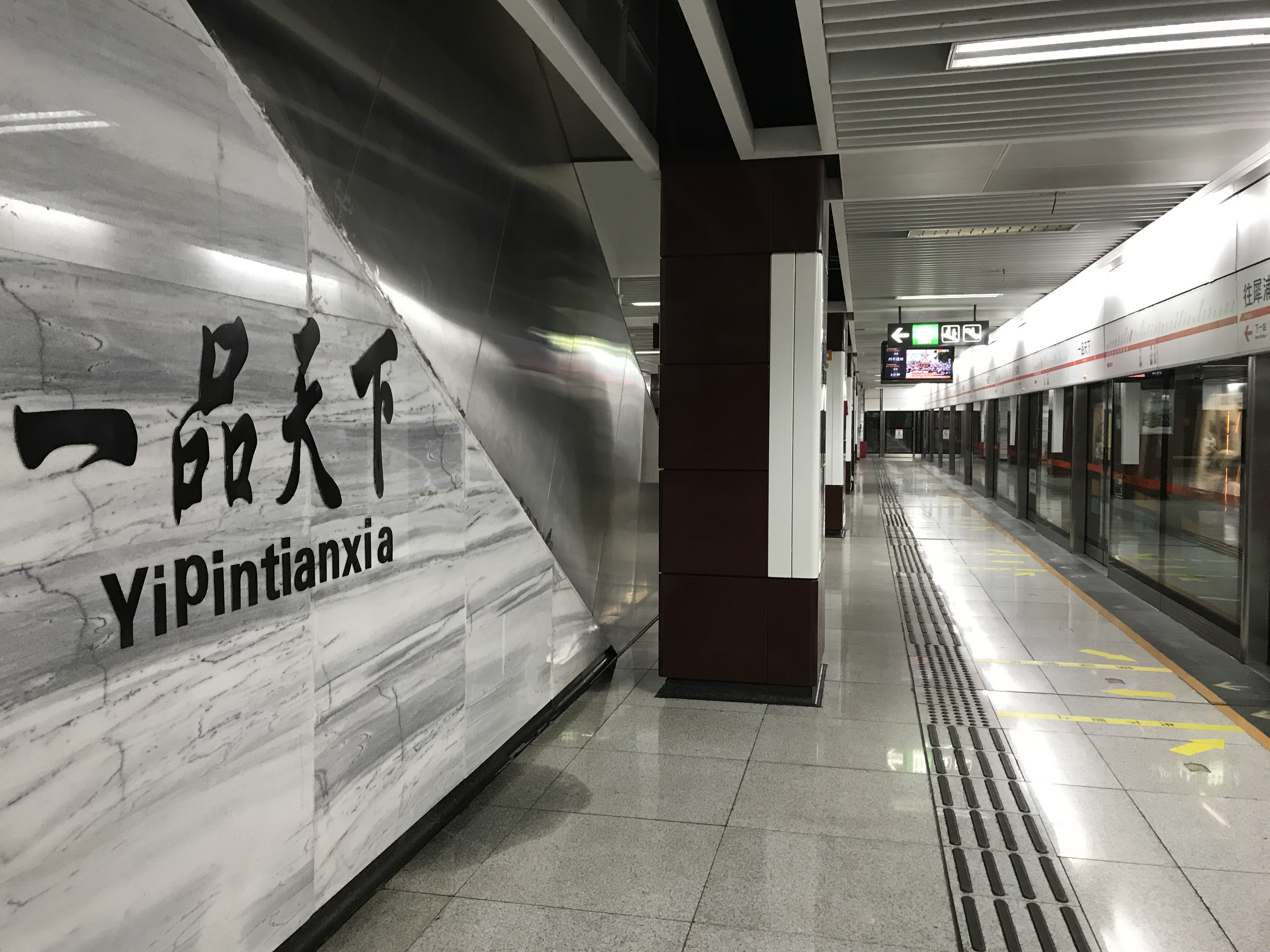
- Line 2 platform

General information
- Location: Jinniu District, Chengdu, Sichuan; China
- Operated by: Chengdu Metro Limited
- Lines: Line 2 Line 7
- Platforms: 4 (2 island platforms)

Other information
- Station code: 0224 0707

History
- Opened: 16 September 2012

Services
| Preceding station | Chengdu Metro | Following station |
|---|---|---|
| Shuhan Road East towards Longquanyi | Line 2 | Yangxi Flyover towards Xipu Railway Station |
| Chadianzi Clockwise | Line 7 | Jinsha Site Museum Anticlockwise |
Location

Yipintianxia station (Chinese: 一品天下站; pinyin: Yīpǐntiānxià zhàn) is a transfer station on Line 2 and Line 7 of the Chengdu Metro in China.

== Station layout ==
| G | Ground level | Exits A, B, D-G |
| B1 | Concourse | Faregates, Station Agent |
| B2 | Westbound | ← Line 2 towards Xipu Railway Station (Yangxi Flyover) |
| B2 | Island platform, doors open on the left |
| B2 | Eastbound | Line 2 towards Longquanyi (Shuhan Road East) → |
| B3 | Clockwise | ← Line 7 to Chadianzi |
| B3 | Island platform, doors open on the left |
| B3 | Counterclockwise | Line 7 to Jinsha Site Museum → |

== Gallery ==
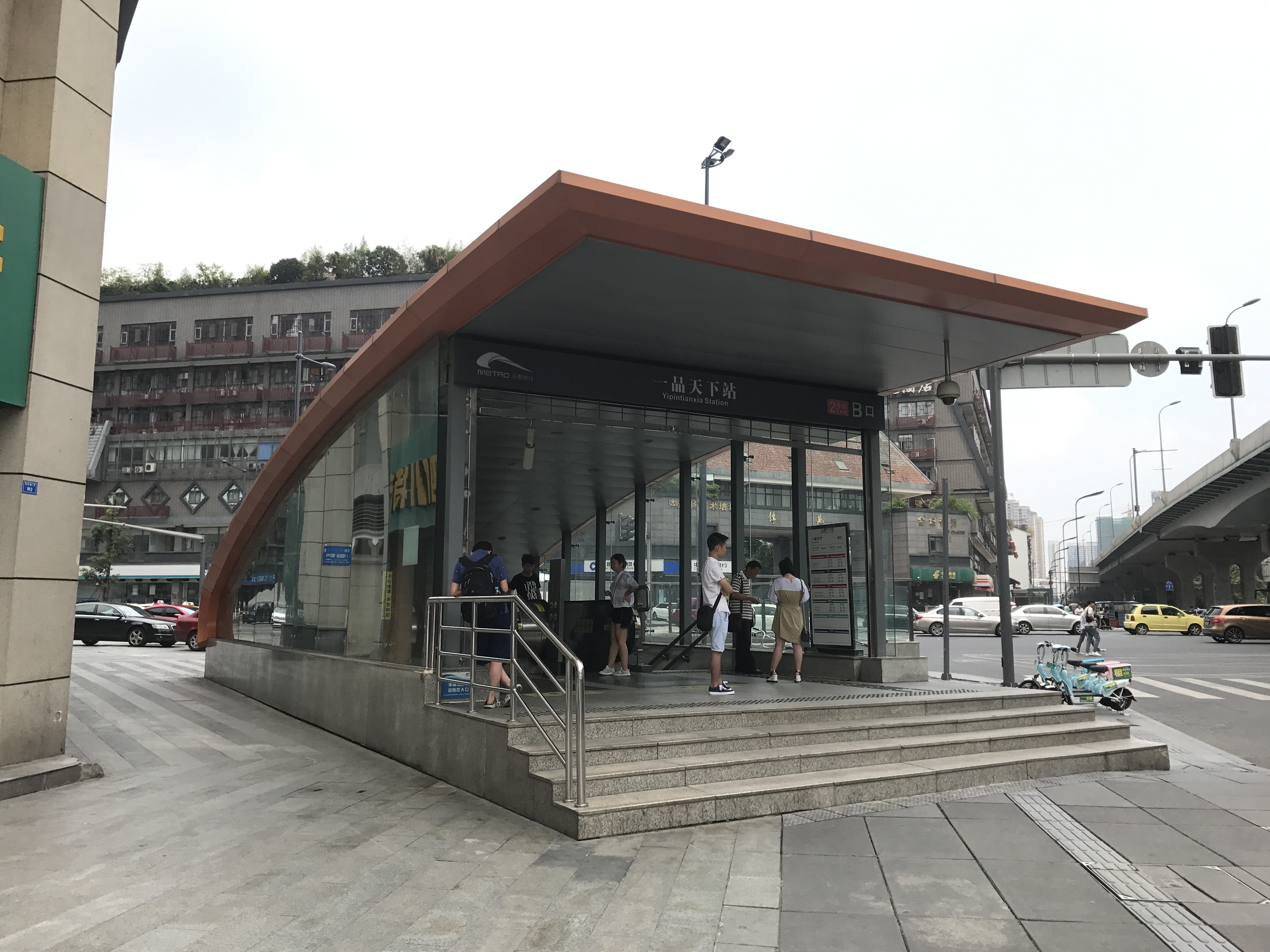
Entrance B

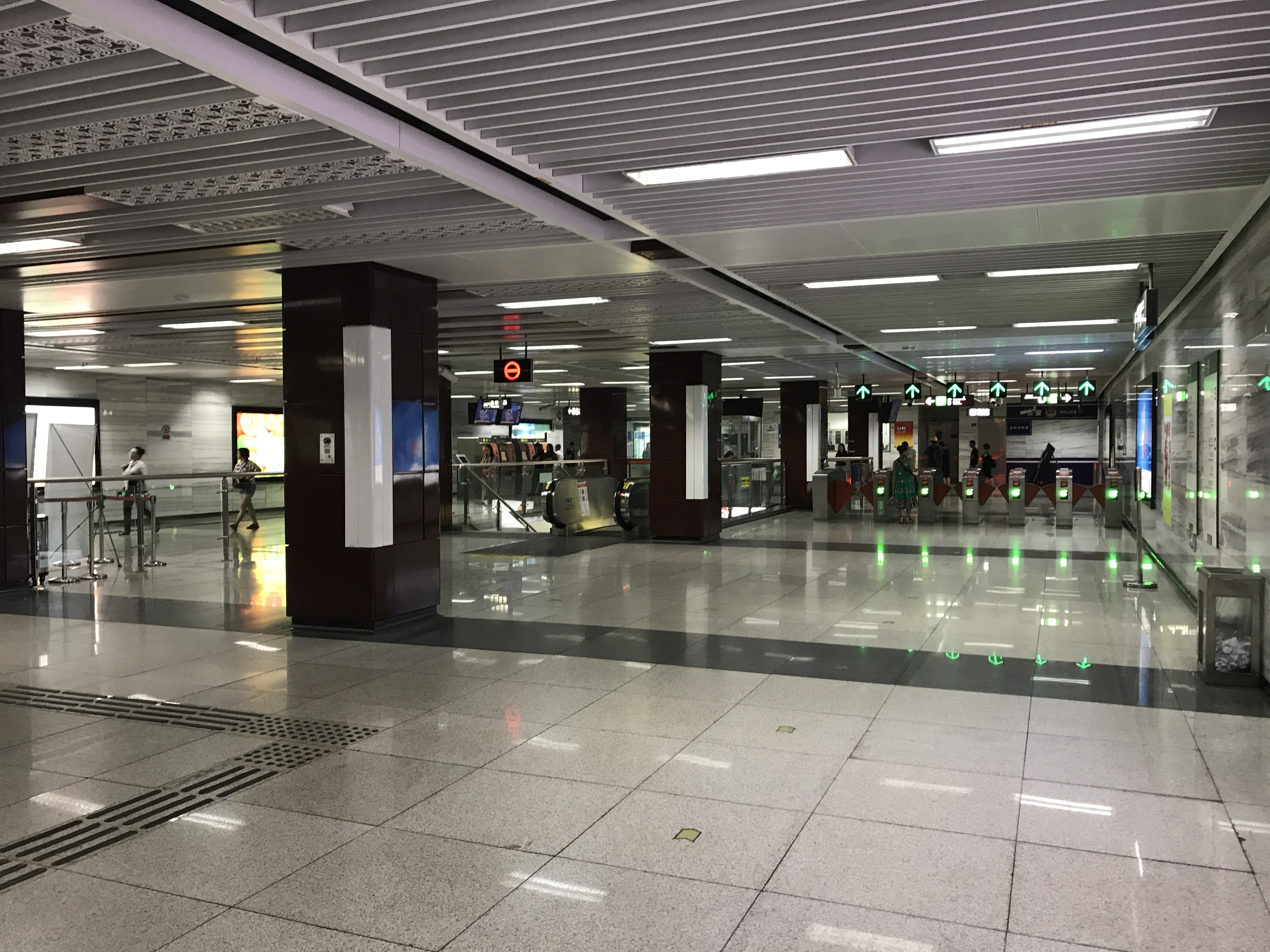
Concourse

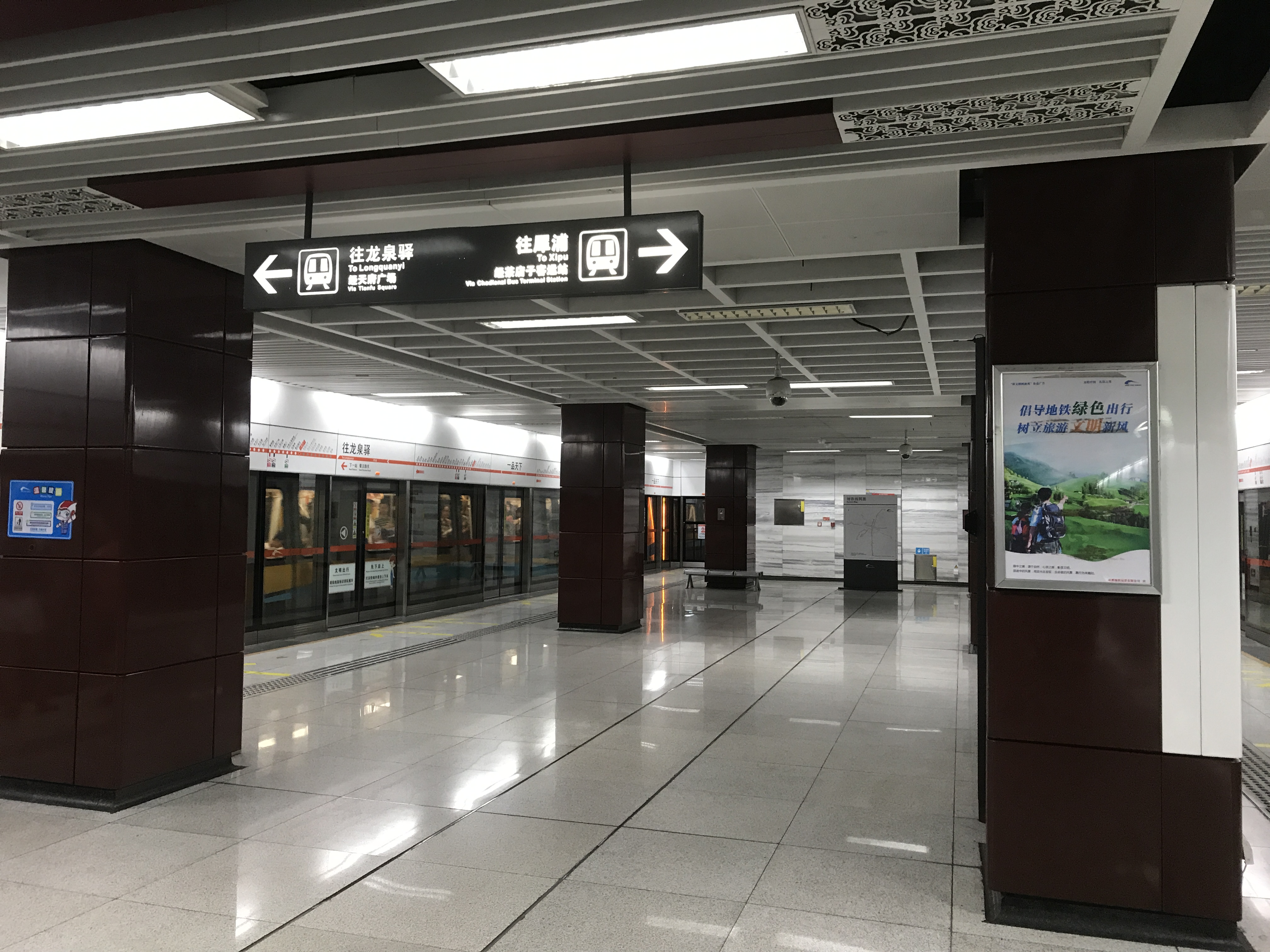
Line 2 platform

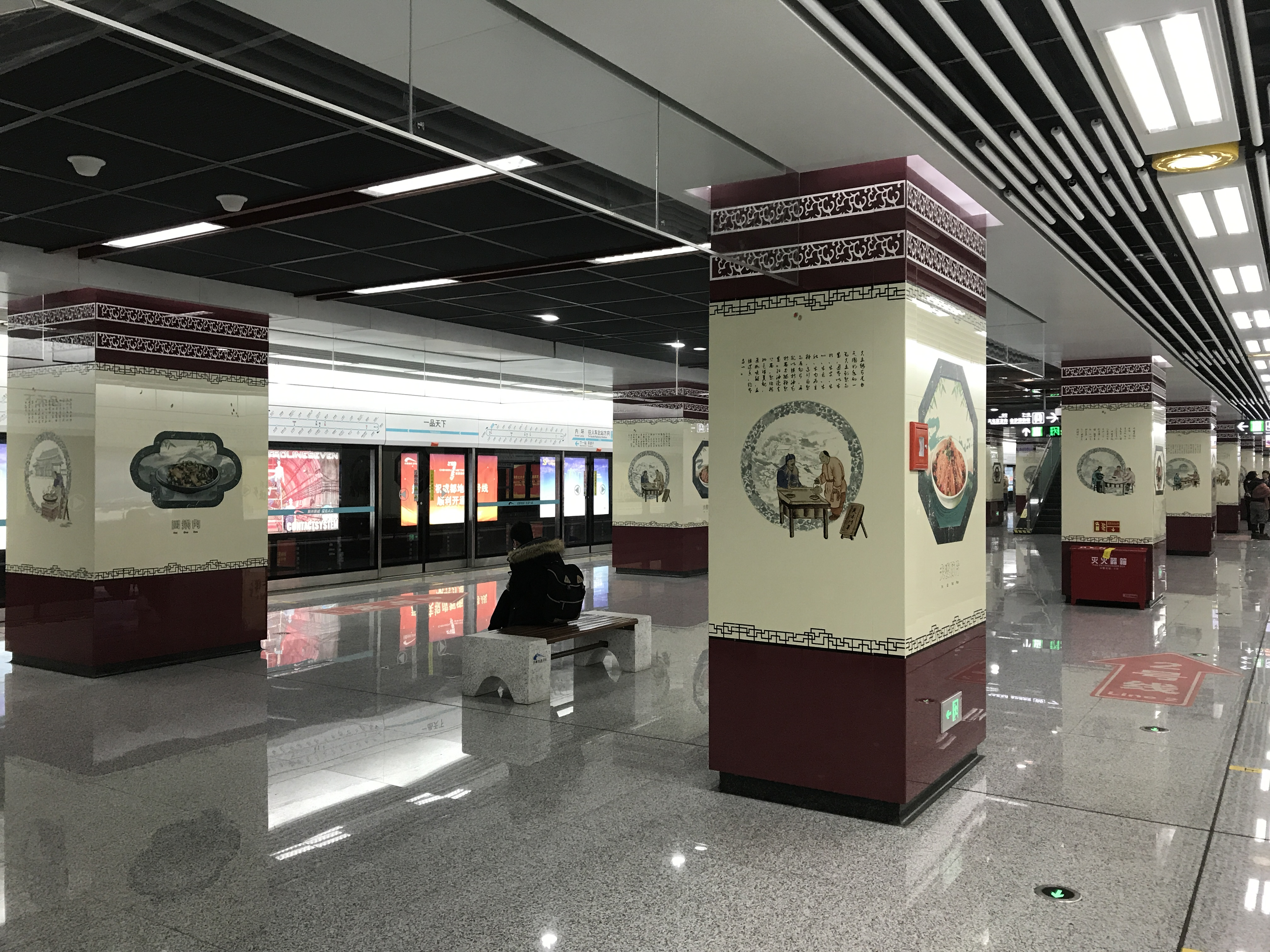
Line 7 platform
