= Railway Protection Movement =

1911 political protest movement in China

- Railway Rights Protection Movement; Part of the 1911 Revolution
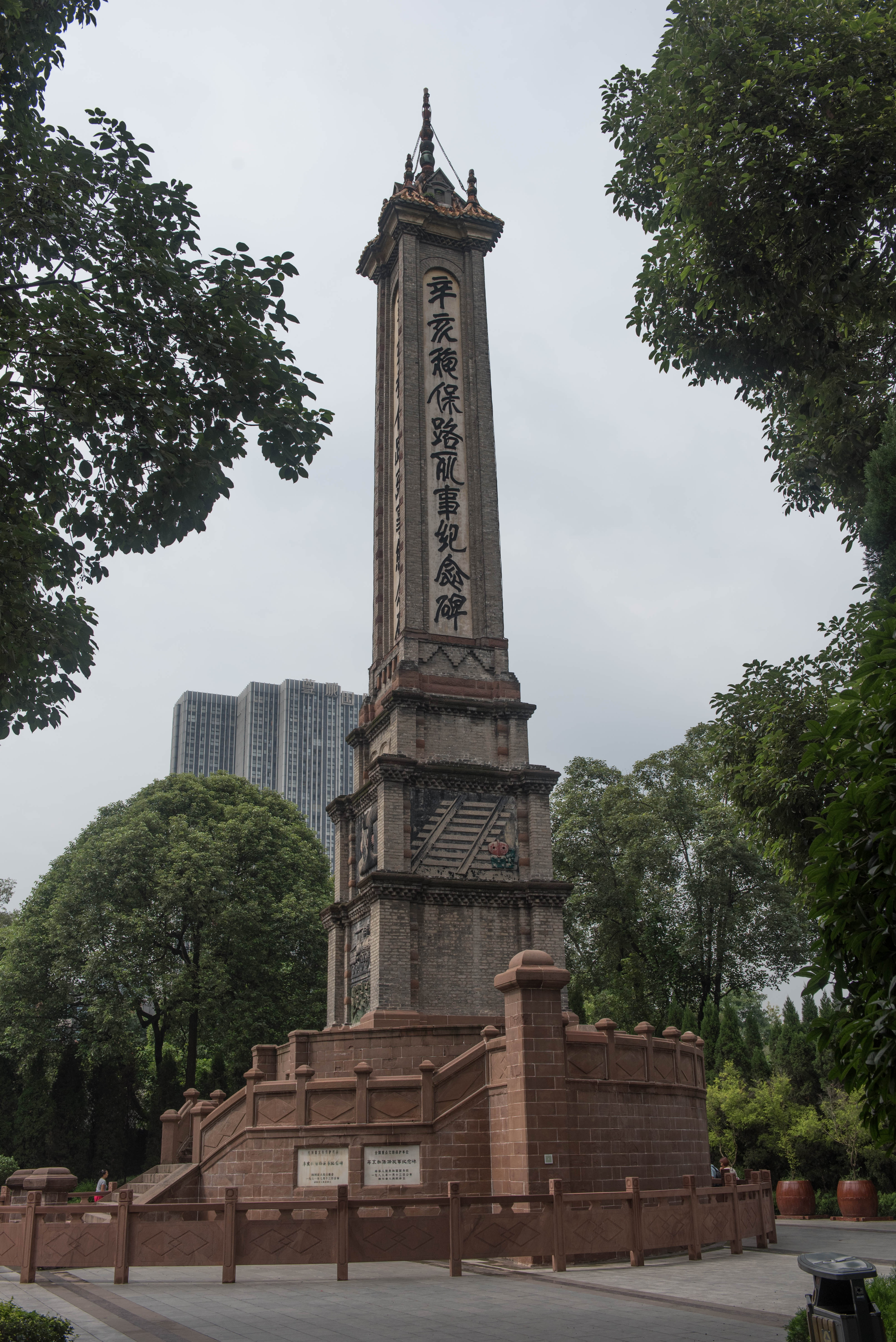
- Monument in honour of the martyrs of the Railway Protection Movement in People's Park, Chengdu
- Date: 17 June 1911 – 9 October 1911 (3 months and 22 days)
- Location: Sichuan, Qing Empire
- Caused by: Anti-Qing sentiment
- Methods: Protests, rallies, and strikes
- Result: Wuchang Uprising

Parties
Qing dynasty; New Army	Resistance: Tongmenghui; Gelaohui

Lead figures
(Qing dynasty) Zhao Erfeng (Qing dynasty) Duanfang	Pu Dianjun

Chinese name
- Traditional Chinese: 保路運動
- Simplified Chinese: 保路运动
- Hanyu Pinyin: bǎo lù yùndòng
Transcriptions
Standard Mandarin
- Hanyu Pinyin: bǎo lù yùndòng

The Railway Protection Movement (simplified Chinese: 保路运动; traditional Chinese: 保路運動; pinyin: bǎo lù yùndòng), also known as the "Railway Rights Protection Movement", was a political protest movement that erupted in 1911 in late Qing China against the Qing government's plan to nationalize local railway development projects and transfer control to foreign banks. The movement, centered in Sichuan province, expressed mass discontent with Qing rule, galvanized anti-Qing groups and contributed to the outbreak of the 1911 Revolution. The mobilization of imperial troops from neighboring Hubei Province to suppress the Railway Protection Movement created the opportunity for revolutionaries in Wuhan to launch the Wuchang Uprising, which triggered the revolution that overthrew the Qing dynasty and established the Republic of China.

== Background ==
From the 1890s to 1905, nearly all railways in China were planned, financed, built and operated by foreign powers pursuant to concessions from the Qing government. To help local economies develop and retain earnings from railways, the Qing government granted the provinces the right to organize their own railway construction ventures.

In 1905, Sichuan Province established the Sichuan-Hankou Railway Company. To raise funds for the 1,238 km railway from Chengdu to Wuhan, the company sold shares to the public and the provincial government levied a special 3% tax on harvests paid by land owners, who were also given share certificates. In one way or another, much of the Sichuan gentry and merchant class became shareholders of the railway venture. By 1911, the company had raised 11,983,305 taels of silver of which 9,288,428 or 77.5% came from tax levies, 2,458,147 taels from public investments and 236,730 taels from government. The company was beset by corruption and mismanagement by government-appointed administrators, and construction efforts made little progress. In 1907, the company management was replaced by a board of trustees consisting of gentry, merchants and retired officials. In 1909, Zhan Tianyou, the Yale-educated builder of the Beijing-Zhangjiakou Railway, was hired as chief engineer. But the board remained divided by squabbles over the route of the planned railway and only about 10 miles of track had been laid by 1911.

Meanwhile, the Qing government, impatient with the progress of locally funded railway projects, returned to foreign lenders. At the time, the Qing authorities were under the financial pressure of having to pay back huge debts under the terms of the Boxer Protocol. By nationalizing the local rail ventures and then selling the rights to those ventures to foreigners, the government could raise money to pay debts owed to Great Britain, Germany, France and the United States. In early May 1911, lenders of the so-called China Consortium including Hongkong Shanghai Banking Corporation (HSBC) of Britain, Deutsch-Asiatische Bank of Germany, Banque de l'Indochine of France, and J.P. Morgan & Co., Kuhn, Loeb & Co. and First National City Bank of New York (CitiBank) of the United States, agreed with the Qing government to finance the construction of railways in central China. On 9 May, Sheng Xuanhuai, Minister of Posts and Communications, ordered the nationalization of all locally controlled railway projects and on 20 May, signed a loan agreement with the China Consortium pledging the rights to operate the Sichuan-Hankou and Hankou-Guangdong Railway in exchange for a 10 million pound loan, to be repaid by custom duties and salt taxes. The Guangdong-Hankou Railway was a locally backed venture in Hubei, Hunan and Guangdong Province.

== Railway Protest Movement ==
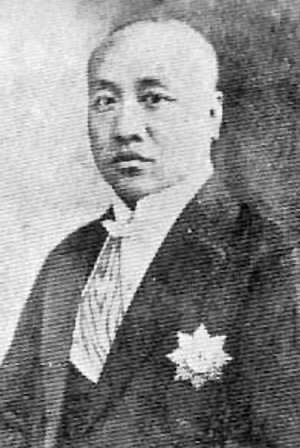
Pu Dianjun, one of the organizers of the Sichuan Railway Protection League, who became the head of the Sichuan revolutionary government during the Xinhai Revolution.

The nationalization order drew strong opposition across southern China, especially Sichuan, which had the largest public shareholding in the Sichuan-Hankou Railway venture. Investors were unhappy that they would only be partially compensated with government bonds, rather than silver.

The amount offered to Sichuan was much lower than all other provinces. Pu Dianjun and other influential members of the Sichuan Provincial Assembly organized the Railway Protection League on 17 June, and made public speeches against the plan, which was widely regarded as a seizure of valuable economic assets by the Manchu court and conversion of local property to foreign control.

=== Bloodshed in Chengdu ===
Between 11 and 13 August, more than 10,000 protesters held a rally against the proposal in Chengdu and organized a series of strikes and boycotts by students and merchants. On 1 September, the Sichuan-Hankou Railway Company adopted a shareholders' resolution calling on the Sichuan public to withhold the payment of grain taxes to the Qing government. On 7 September, the Governor-General of Sichuan, Zhao Erfeng had Pu Dianjun and other leaders arrested and closed the company. Enraged protesters then marched on the Governor-General's office in Chengdu demanding Pu's release. In what became known as the Bloody Chengdu Incident, Zhao ordered troops to open fire and dozens of protesters were killed. In Chengdu there were 32 deaths. Authorities closed the Chengdu city gates and had them heavily guarded. Protestors created "water telegrams" by carving a message on to oiled boards, which were smuggled out and floated downriver:

Butcher Zhao arrested Pu and Luo,

Then massacred the Sichuan people.

In all places, friends, arise, save and protect your land!

Bloodshed further inflamed the protests. Underground anti-Qing groups including the Tongmenghui and Gelaohui initiated armed clashes with Qing troops in and around Chengdu. On 15 September, Wang Tianjie, head of the Gelaohui in Rong County south of Chengdu organized the Comrades' Army and led 800 followers to march on Chengdu, vowing to topple Zhao Erfeng. As tensions escalated in Sichuan, the Qing government removed Zhao Erfeng from the governorship and offered full compensation to investors. But armed groups numbering as many as over a hundred thousand were overwhelming government authorities in Sichuan. Gelaohui militants were the majority of armed combatants against Qing soldiers and Sichuan government militias.

In one of the Xinhai Revolution's first major battles, Zhao's modernized New Army soldiers opened fire from Chengdu's gates onto Gelaohui fighters, killing more than a thousand. The New Army forces were equipped with repeating weapons and artillery. They pushed back the rebel siege of Chengdu. Continued fighting over the next two months required Qing leaders to divert troops from central China to Sichuan.

=== New Army orders and mutiny ===
The Qing court also ordered the Governor-General of Hubei and Hunan, Duanfang, to reinforce Sichuan with troops from Hubei. The situation in Hubei and Hunan was slightly different; elites in those provinces were not as outraged as elites in Sichuan over the nationalization of the provincial railways. The press together with radical students in both provinces reproached local elites for their perceived passivity and servility, and compared them unfavorably to the protesters in Sichuan. As Joseph Esherick has explained, it was in this atmosphere of heated rhetoric that the public mood in both provinces began to radicalize: "[T]he general belief that the Manchu dynasty was coming to an end ... was slowly transformed into a wish that the dynasty would fall."

In turn, the mobilization of New Army troops from Hubei forced underground revolutionary groups there to expedite their planned uprising. The diversion of New Army troops weakened defenses in Wuhan but also took away some of the army units sympathetic to the revolutionaries. Nonetheless, the diversion of Qing troops from central China to fight in Sichuan was a major reason why the Wuchang Uprising, which began on 10 October 1911, was successful.

== Aftermath ==
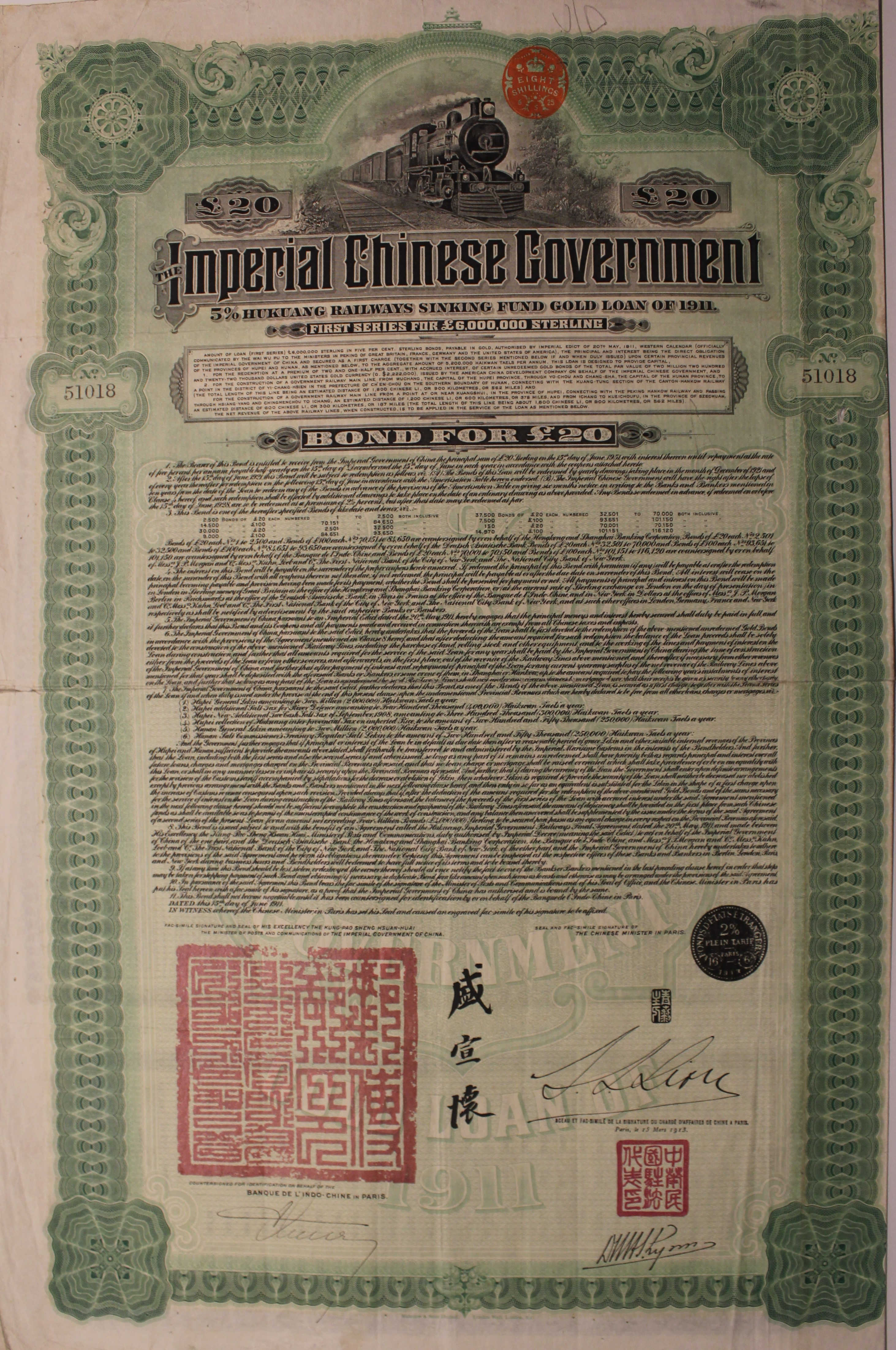
Hukuang bond, issued 15 June 1911

After the outbreak of the Xinhai Revolution, uprisings and clashes in Sichuan between loyalists and revolutionaries continued into November. Duanfang was killed by Liu Yifeng after a mutiny by the New Army. On 14 November, Zhao Erfeng released Pu Dianjun from prison and negotiated an agreement to hand over power to a newly established Great Han Military Government of Sichuan. On 27 November, Pu Dianjun declared Sichuan's independence from the Qing dynasty. Zhao Erfeng was subsequently accused of fomenting a coup that briefly swept Chengdu in December and was executed by the revolutionaries on 28 December.

Ironically, the Sichuan–Hankou Railway, the underlying cause of all this trouble, remained unbuilt for decades due to political turmoil, warfare, inadequate funding, and extremely difficult terrain. The Chengdu–Chongqing Railway, built in 1955, and the Xiangyang–Chongqing Railway, completed in 1979, eventually connected Chengdu and Wuhan, but the journey takes an indirect path through Shaanxi Province. The long-dormant plans for a railway along the original Sichuan-Hankou Railway route were eventually brought to fruition a century later as the Shanghai–Wuhan–Chengdu Passenger Dedicated Line, the last section of which opened on 1 July 2012.

As late as 1983, over 300 American investors tried, unsuccessfully, to force the government of China to redeem the worthless Hukuang bonds.

== Bibliography ==
- Dillon, Michael (2010). China: a modern history. I.B. Tauris. ISBN 978-1-85043-582-2.
- Fairbank, John; Liu, Kwang-Ching, eds. (1980). The Cambridge History of China. Vol. 11, Part 2. Cambridge University Press. ISBN 978-0-521-22029-3.
- Fogel, Peter A.; Zarrow, Peter Gue (1997). Imagining the people: Chinese intellectuals and the concept of citizenship, 1890-1920. M.E.Sharpe. ISBN 978-0-7656-0098-1.
- Gao, James Zheng (1997). Meeting technology's advance: social change in China and Zimbabwe in the railway age. Greenwood Publishing Group. ISBN 978-0-313-30095-0.
- Guo 郭, Qin 钦. 风雨欲来——重绘辛亥革命历史地图. 湖南人民出版社. Archived from the original on 7 April 2012.
- Rhoads, Edward J. M. (2000). Manchus & Han: ethnic relations and political power in late Qing and early republican China, 1861-1928. University of Washington Press. ISBN 978-0-295-98040-9.
- Wu, Yuzhang (2001). Recollections of the Revolution of 1911: A Great Democratic Revolution of China. Minerva Group. ISBN 978-0-89875-531-2.
