= People's Park (Chengdu) =

Urban public park in Chengdu, Sichuan, China

- Renmin Park
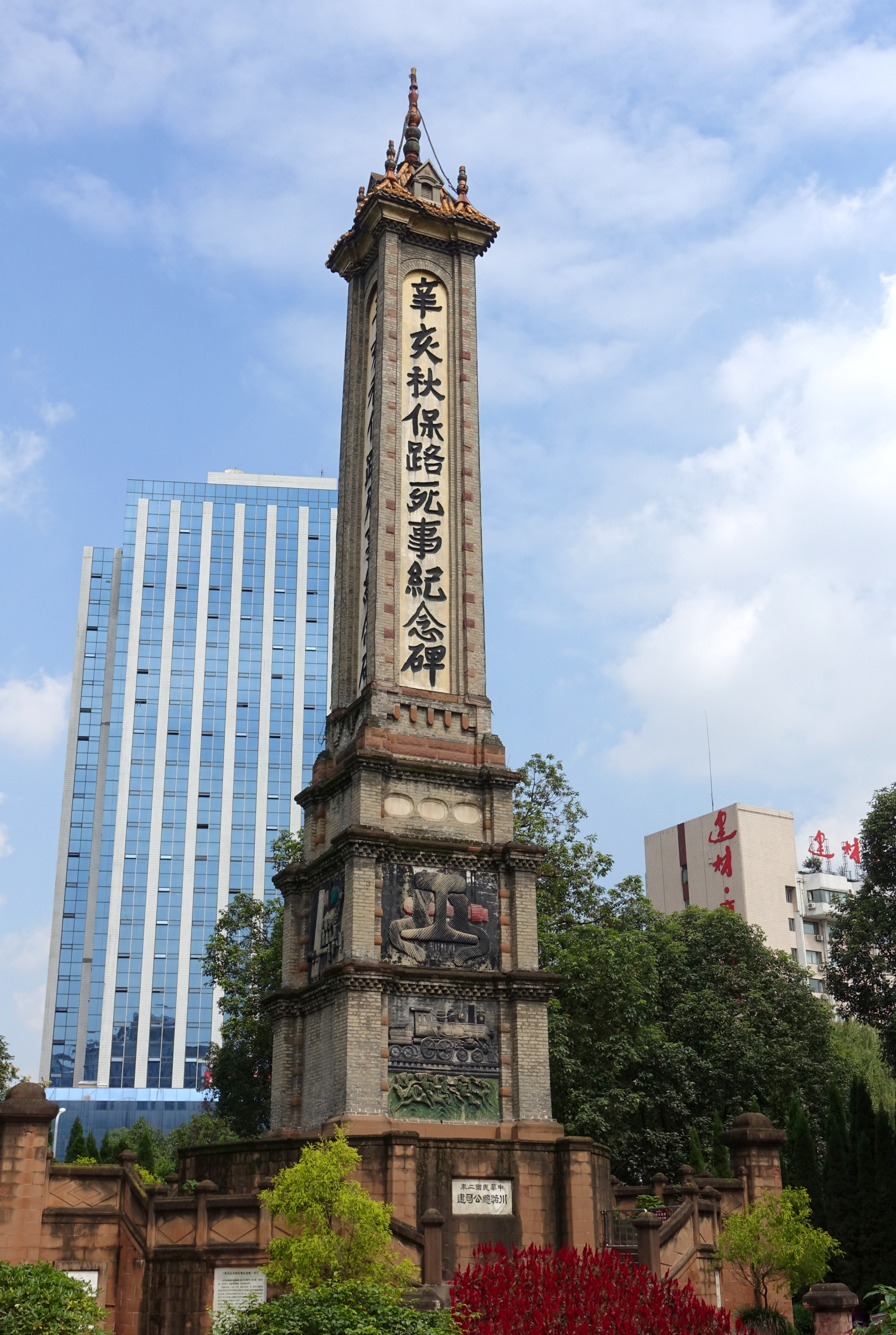
- Monument to the Martyrs of the Railway Protection Movement in People's Park
- Interactive map of People's Park
- Type: Urban park
- Location: Chengdu, Sichuan, China
- Coordinates: 30.6595°N 104.0549°E
- Area: 112,639 m^{2} (1,212,440 sq ft)
- Created: 1911

People's Park (Chinese: 人民公园; pinyin: Rénmín Gōngyuán) is an urban public park in central Chengdu, capital of Sichuan province, China. Built in 1911 as Shaocheng Park (少城公园), it is the first public park in the city. The Railway Protection Movement Monument in the park is designated a Major Historical and Cultural Site of China.

== Overview ==
People's Park is located on Shaocheng Road in central Chengdu, near Tianfu Square. Covering an area of 112,639 square metres (1,212,440 sq ft), it is the largest green area in downtown Chengdu. The park features an artificial lake, several gardens, the Railway Protection Movement Monument, and the century-old Heming Teahouse (鹤鸣茶馆), a local landmark.

== History ==
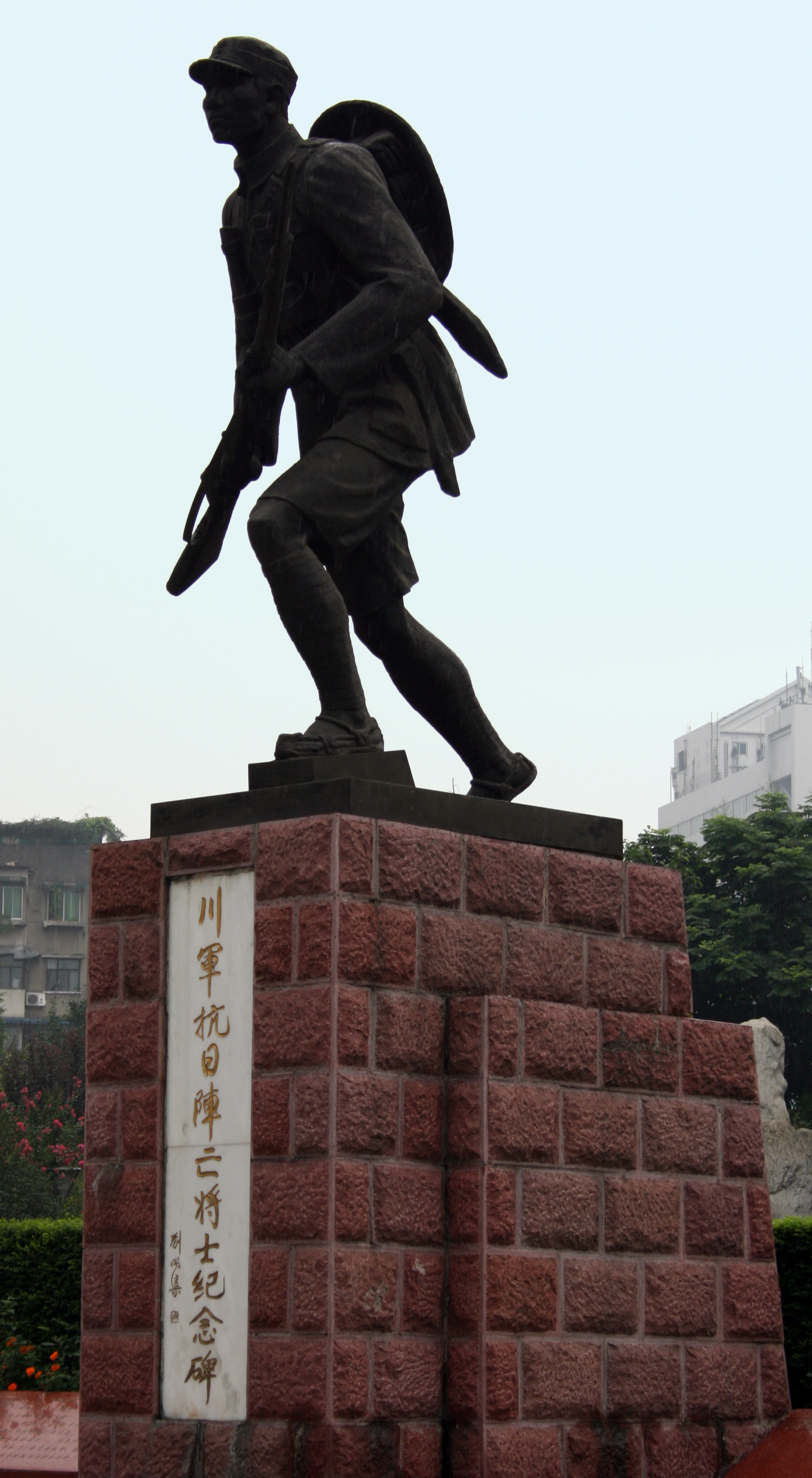
Monument to the Sichuan Army Martyrs of the Second Sino-Japanese War

The park is located in the former Shaocheng ("small city"), which was built by the Qing dynasty as the garrison for the Manchu and Mongol soldiers from the Eight Banners. In 1911, Yu Kun (玉昆), the last Qing general in Chengdu, converted part of Shaocheng into the city's first public park, known as Shaocheng Park.

In 1911, the Railway Protection Movement erupted in Sichuan, which led to the Xinhai Revolution that overthrew the Qing dynasty and replaced it with the Republic of China. From 1913–14, the new republican government built the Monument to the Martyrs of the Railway Protection Movement (辛亥秋保路死事纪念碑) in the park, which is now a Major Historical and Cultural Site of China.

The park was enlarged in 1914. In 1924, Governor Yang Sen appointed prominent businessman Lu Zuofu (卢作孚) to be the education minister of Sichuan. Lu made many improvements to the park, building museums, a library, a zoo, and sports facilities.

During the Second Sino-Japanese War, a bronze statue of General Wang Mingzhang of the Sichuan Army was erected in the park, after Wang was killed in the Battle of Xuzhou. On 27 September 1940 and 27 July 1941, Shaocheng Park was twice bombed by Japanese warplanes, which destroyed many facilities and caused thousands of casualties, although the Railway Protection Monument survived.

After the establishment of the People's Republic of China in 1949, the new Communist government renamed the park as People's Park in 1950. The park was enlarged, refurbished, and reopened in October 1952, but the Wang Mingzhang statue was demolished.

== Transportation ==
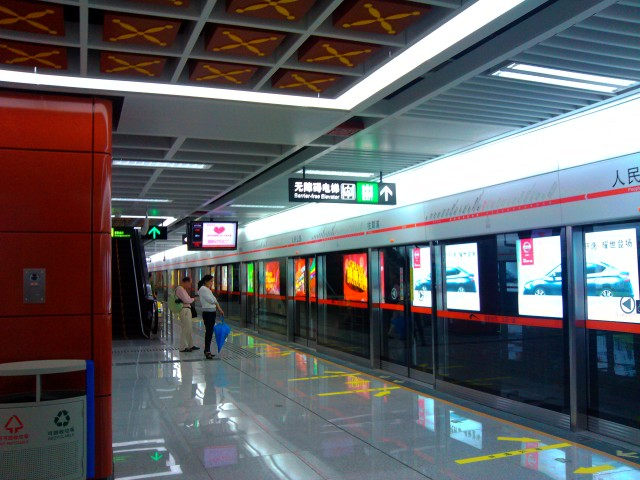
People's Park station of the Chengdu Metro

The park has its own station, People's Park station, on Line 2 of the Chengdu Metro. It is also served by bus lines 5, 13, and 37.
