= Tonghuimen station =

Metro station in Chengdu, China

Tonghuimen 通惠门
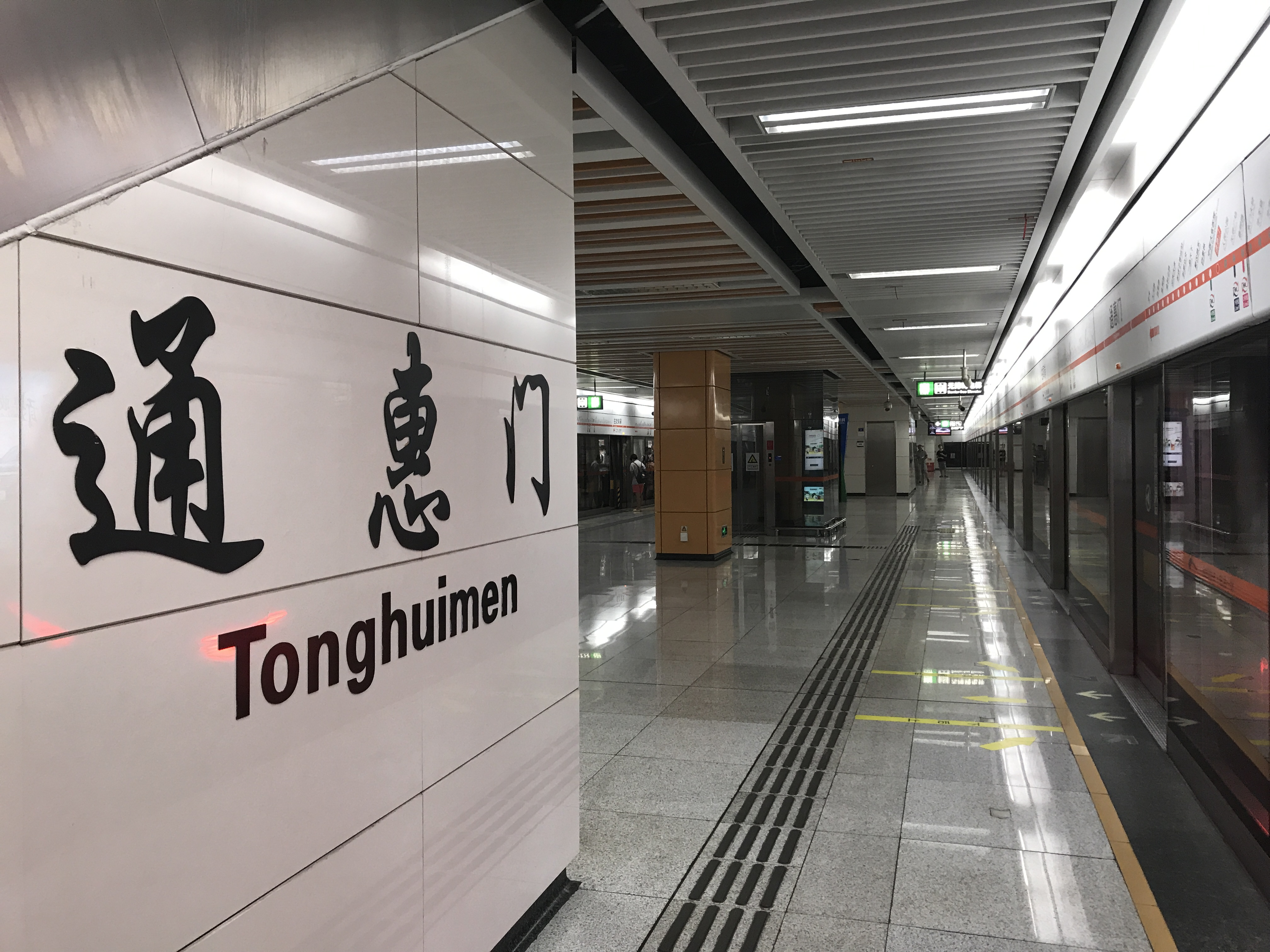

General information
- Location: Qingyang District, Chengdu, Sichuan; China
- Coordinates: 30.6647426°N 104.0458473°E
- Operated by: Chengdu Metro Limited
- Line: Line 2
- Platforms: 2 (1 island platform)

Other information
- Station code: 0220

History
- Opened: 16 September 2012

Services
Preceding station	Chengdu Metro	Following station
People's Park towards Longquanyi	Line 2	Chengdu University of TCM & Sichuan Provincial People's Hospital towards Xipu Railway Station
Location

Tonghuimen (Chinese: 通惠门) is a station on Line 2 of the Chengdu Metro in China.

== Station layout ==
G	Entrances and Exits	Exits A, C-E
B1	Concourse	Faregates, Station Agent
B2	Westbound	← Line 2 towards Xipu (Chengdu University of TCM & Sichuan Provincial People's Hospital)
B2	Island platform, doors open on the left
B2	Eastbound	Line 2 towards Longquanyi (People's Park) →

== Gallery ==
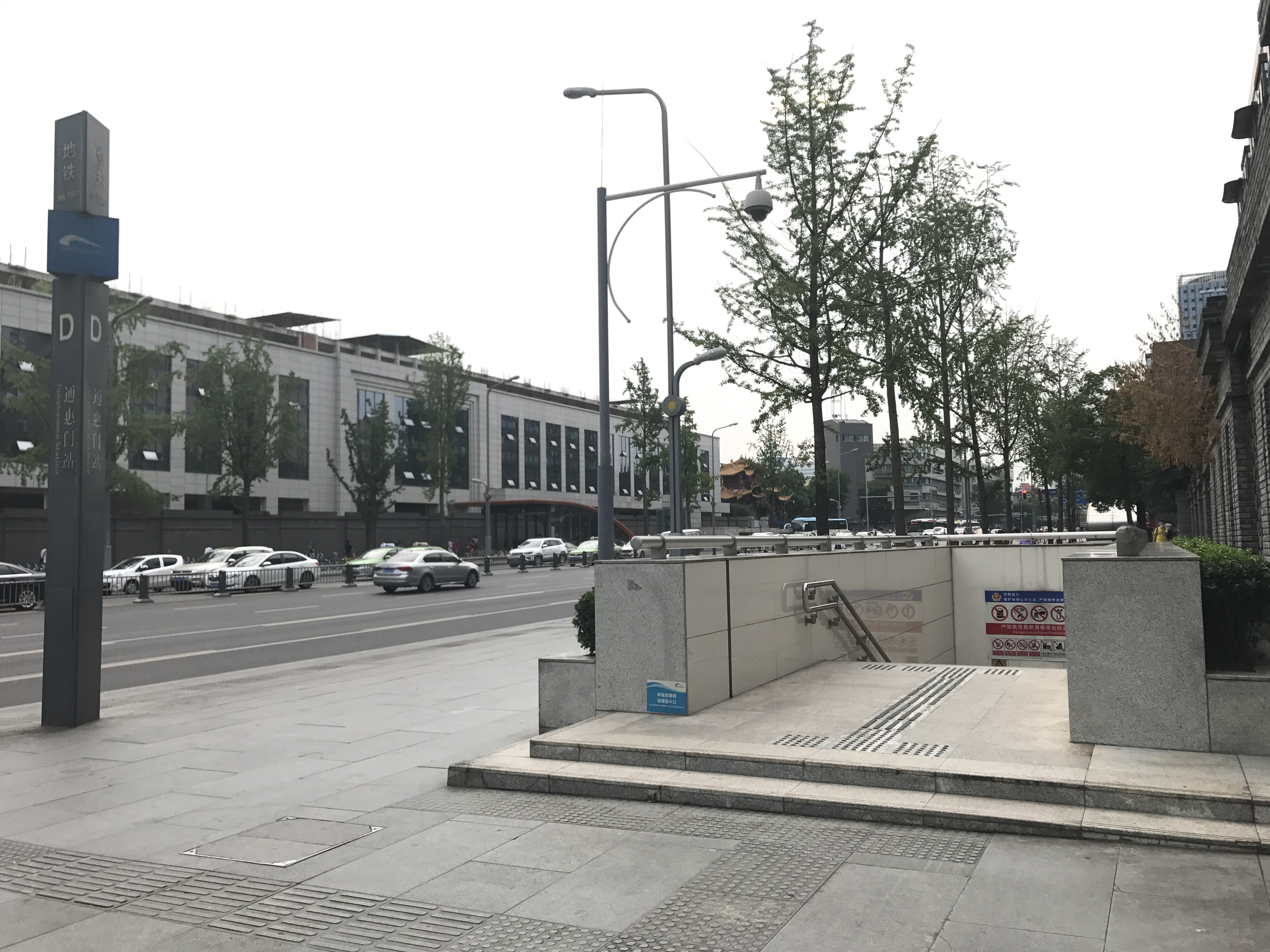
Entrance D

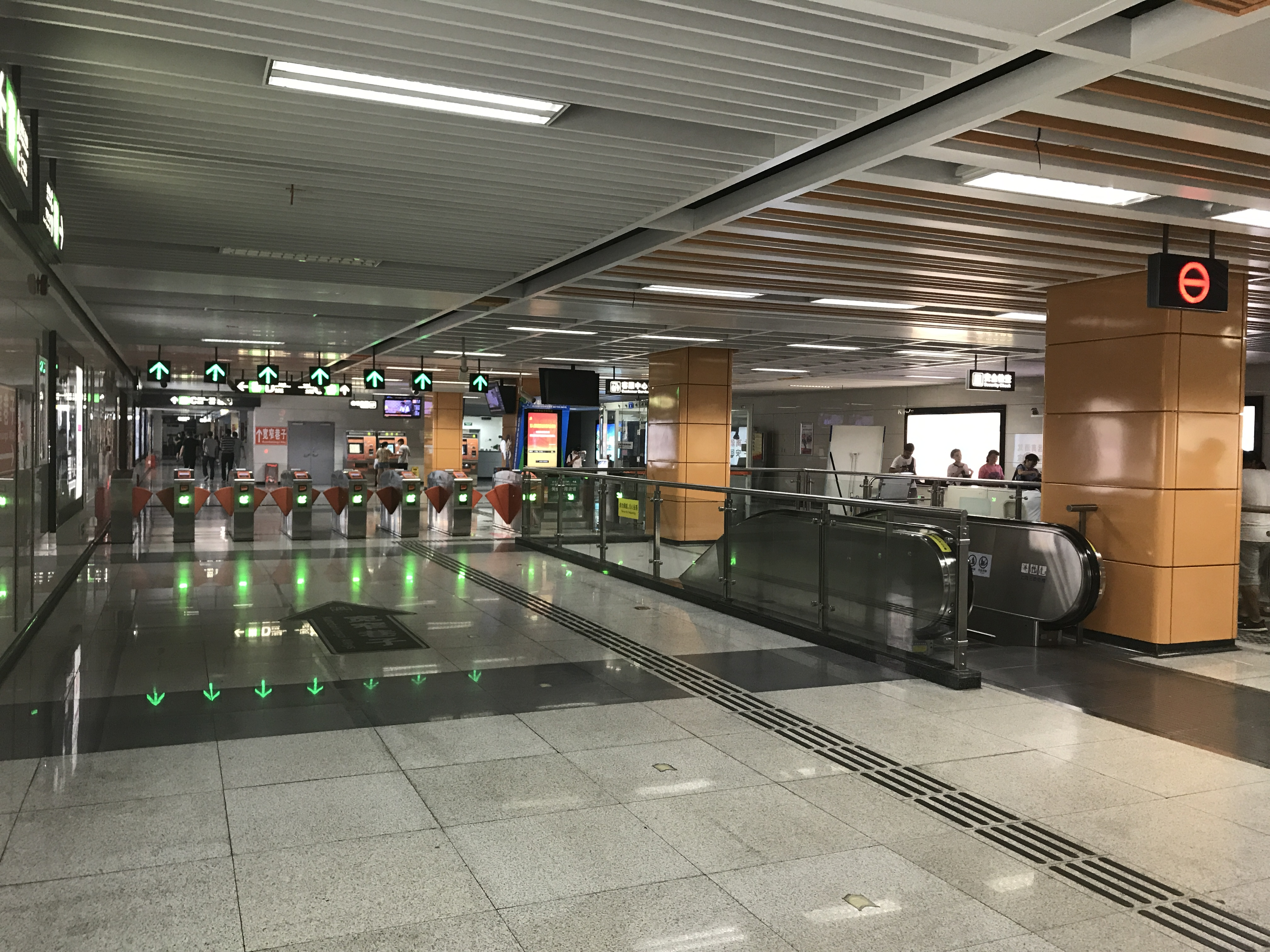
Concourse

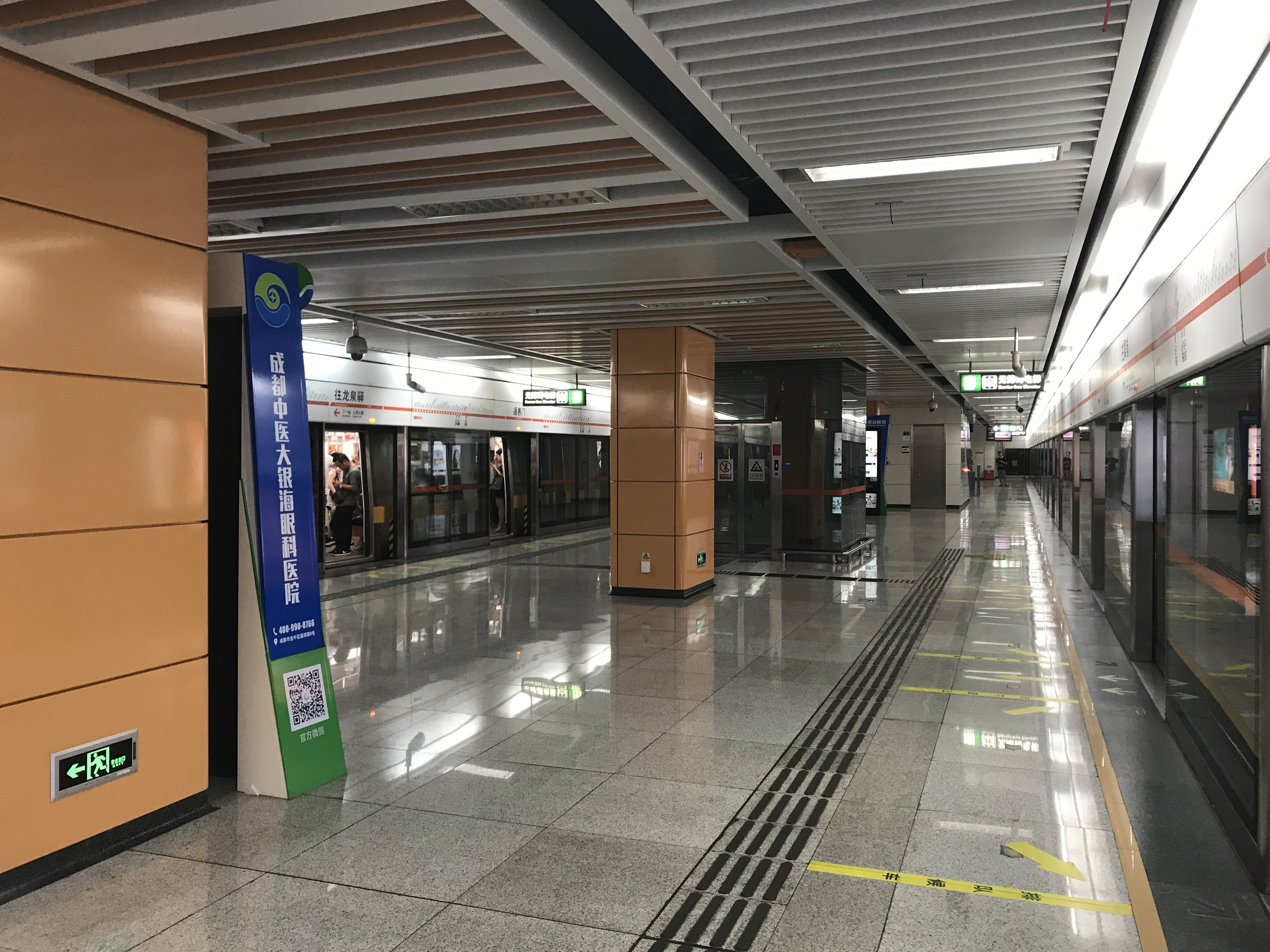
Platform
