= List of statues of Mao Zedong =

This article lists statues of Mao Zedong.

== China ==
Province	Location	Name	Image	Year Completed	Notes
Anhui	Hefei				Located at Anhui Medical University in Hefei.
Beijing	Beijing				Located at Beijing University of Posts and Telecommunications
Beijing	Beijing				Located at University of Science and Technology Beijing
Beijing	Beijing				Located at China University of Geosciences (Beijing)
Hunan	Changsha	Young Mao Zedong		2009	Located on Orange Isle in Changsha.
Hunan	Changsha				Located inside Changsha South Bus Station.
Hunan	Changsha			1967	Located on Dongfanghong Square in Yuelu District, Changsha. Erected on 26 December 1967 by students and staff of Hunan University.
Hunan	Changsha				Located at the City Museum, Changsha.
Hunan	Changsha				Located in Chili Garden, Changsha. Erected to commemorate Mao Zedong's inspection of Huogong Palace in 1958. The inscription reads "Huogong Palace's stinky tofu smells bad but tastes delicious."
Hunan	Shaoshan			1993	Bronze statue designed by Liu Kaiqu and Cheng Yunxian located on Mao Zedong Square in Shaoshan, Mao Zedong's birthplace. Erected to celebrate the 100th anniversary of Mao Zedong's birth. On the base is inscribed "Comrade Mao Zedong, 24 November 1992" by Jiang Zemin.
Hunan	Wenjiashi				Bronze statue located in the memorial hall of the Site of Joining Forces in Wenjiashi of Autumn Harvest Uprising.
Chongqing	Chongqing				Located at the entrance of Southwest University in Beibei District, Chongqing.
Guizhou	Guiyang				
Hebei	Zhangjiakou				Located on Cultural Square in Zhangjiakou.
Hebei	Tangshan				Located at Tangshan Museum.
Heilongjiang	Fularji				
Henan	Nanjie				Statue of Mao Zedong in Nanjie Commune, flanked by portraits of Friedrich Engels (left) and Vladimir Lenin (right).
Henan	Zhengzhou				Located at People's Square, Zhengzhou.
Henan	Zhengzhou	Memorial of Mao Zedong's Visit to Yanzhuang			Located on Jinshui Road. Commemorates Mao Zedong's visit to Yanzhuang.
Henan	Kaifeng				Located in Bianjing Park, Kaifeng.
Henan	Guangkuotiandi, Jia County				Located in Guangkuotiandi Township, Jia County, Henan.
Henan	Luoyang				Located in Wangcheng Park, Luoyang.
Henan	Luoyang				Located in front of YTO Group Headquarters in Luoyang.
Henan	Luoyang				Located in front of Luoyang Bearing Factory.
Henan	Shancheng				
Henan	Zhoukou				Located at the former site of Xihua May Seventh Cadre School of the State Planning Commission.
Hubei	Wuhan				Located on the campus of Huazhong University of Science and Technology.
Jiangsu	Shiyue Village				
Jiangxi	Xingguo County				Located in front of Xingguo Pingchuan High School in Xingguo County.
Jilin	Changchun				Located at the former site of Changchun Film Studio.
Sichuan	Chengdu	Statue of Mao Zedong, Chengdu		1968	Located in front of the Sichuan Science and Technology Museum on Tianfu Square in Chengdu.
Tianjin	Huangyaguan				Located near the Great Wall of China (visible in the background) at Huangyaguan.
Fujian	Fuzhou	Statue of Mao Zedong, Fuzhou		1969	Located on Wuyi Square in Fuzhou. Built by artist Yang Zhengrong.
Liaoning	Shenyang	Long Live the Victory of Mao Zedong Thought		1970	Epoxy resin statue located on Zhongshan Square in Heping District, Shenyang. Inaugurated on 1 October 1970 as part of 21st anniversary celebrations of the founding of the People's Republic.
Liaoning	Dandong				Located by Dandong railway station.
Shandong	Jinan				Located on Dongfanghong Square on the Qianfoshan campus of Shandong Normal University.
Shandong	Jinan	Memorial for Chairman Mao's inspection of the North Park Commune			Built to commemorate an inspection visit by Mao Zedong on 9 August 1958 to promote the idea of the people's commune. Located in Tianqiao District, Jinan. It was designated a protected historical site by Shandong Province in December 1977.
Shandong	Qingdao				Located in Laoshan District, Qingdao.
Shanghai	Shanghai				Located in Fudan University in Yangpu District, Shanghai.
Shanghai	Shanghai				Located at East China Normal University, Shanghai.
Shanghai	Xuhui District				Located on the Xuhui campus of the East China University of Science and Technology.
Shaanxi	Yan'an				Located at Yan'an Revolutionary Memorial Hall.
Xinjiang	Hotan				Statue of Mao Zedong and Kurban Tulum on Tuanjie Square in Hotan.
Xinjiang	Kashgar				Located outside the People's Park in Kashgar.
Xinjiang	Niya				Monument to Mao Zedong in downtown Minfeng (Niya) in Niya County.
Xinjiang	Yutian County				Statue of Mao Zedong and Kurban Tulum in Yutian County, Xinjiang.
Yunnan	Lijiang				Located on Red Sun Square in Gucheng District, Lijiang.
Yunnan	Shangri-La				Located at Red Sun Square, Shangri-La.
Yunnan	Zhaotong				Located in Zhenxiong People's Park in Zhenxiong County.
Zhejiang	Hangzhou				Seated statue of Mao Zedong reading. Located at Zhejiang Provincial Museum in Hangzhou.
Zhejiang	Hangzhou				Located at the site of the Hangzhou Second Textile Factory.
Zhejiang	Hangzhou				Located on Yuquan Campus, Zhejiang University in Hangzhou.

== Outside China ==
=== France ===
Location	Name	Image	Year Completed	Notes
Montpellier			2012	Located at Place des Grands Hommes, Montpellier. Commissioned by Georges Frêche in 2010 as one of several statues of "great men" of history. Its installation was controversial and is one of the only statues of Mao Zedong outside China.
