= Mao Zedong Statue =

Mao Zedong Statue may refer to:

- Mao Zedong Statue (Chengdu)
- Mao Zedong Statue (Fuzhou)
- Long Live the Victory of Mao Zedong Thought, a statue of Mao Zedong in Shenyang
- Young Mao Zedong statue
