= Tianhu =

Tianhu may refer to:

- Sky Fox (mythology) (Chinese: 天狐; pinyin: Tiānhú) from Chinese mythology
- Tianhu, Henan, town in Song County, Henan, China
- Tianhu Subdistrict, Ningguo, Anhui, China

== See also ==
- Tian Hu, fictional character from the Chinese novel Water Margin
