= Songzhou (disambiguation) =

Songzhou or Song Prefecture (宋州) was a historical prefecture located in the border area of modern Chinese provinces of Henan, Anhui and Shandong intermittently from 596 to 1006.

Songzhou or Song Prefecture may also refer to other historical prefectures of China:

- Songzhou (宋州), in modern Hanoi, Vietnam, from 621
- Songzhou (松州), in modern Songpan County, Sichuan from 618 to 742, from 758 to 763 and from the 13th century to 1387
- Songzhou (嵩州), in modern Dengfeng, Henan from 596 to 604, and from 621 to 629
- Songzhou (嵩州), in modern Song County, Henan from 1151 to 1369
