= Tianfu Square =

Public square in Chengdu, Sichuan, China

Coordinates: 30.6599°N 104.0634°E

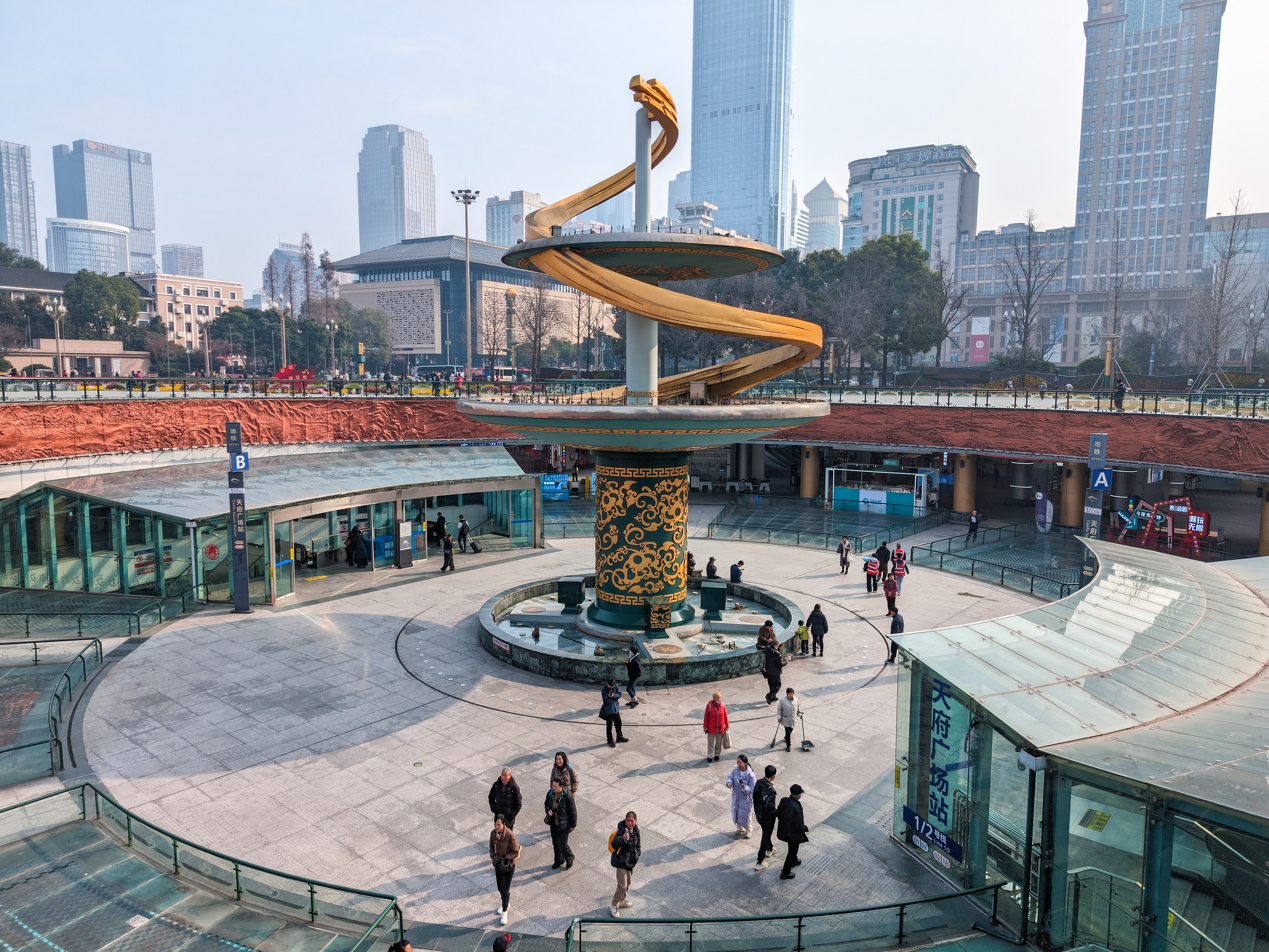
- Tianfu Square from the sunken plaza
- Simplified Chinese: 天府广场
- Traditional Chinese: 天府廣場
Transcriptions
Standard Mandarin
- Hanyu Pinyin: Tiānfǔ Guǎngchǎng

Tianfu Square (Chinese: 天府广场) is a major public square in central Chengdu, Sichuan, China. Located at the geographic intersection of the city's principal north–south and east–west axes, it occupies approximately 88,000 m^{2} (22 acres) and is commonly regarded as one of Chengdu's principal civic landmarks.

The present square is characterized by a large taijitu-inspired landscape incorporating the Sun and Immortal Birds motif from the Jinsha site, fountains, water features, a sunken plaza, and elements derived from ancient Ba–Shu culture. A large statue of Mao Zedong, erected during the Cultural Revolution, stands on the northern side in front of the Sichuan Science and Technology Museum.

== History ==
Bicycle traffic on the square, 1988

The area occupied by Tianfu Square has long formed part of Chengdu's political and civic center. It was historically known as Huangchengba (皇城坝; lit. 'Imperial City grounds'), after the walled palace complex of the Ming dynasty princes of Shu that stood in the area. The palace was surrounded by a moat known as the Yu River, and the site remained an important administrative district in later periods.

After the establishment of the People's Republic of China, construction of Renmin South Road and new public buildings transformed the former Huangchengba area into Renmin South Road Square (人民南路广场). During the Cultural Revolution, in 1968, the surviving former imperial-city structures were demolished and an exhibition hall was constructed on the site. The building was later converted into the Sichuan Science and Technology Museum. The Mao Zedong statue in front of the building dates from the same period.

Skyscrapers on the corner of South Renmin Road

The square was renamed Tianfu Square in 1999. A major reconstruction was undertaken in the 2000s in conjunction with the construction of the Chengdu Metro. The landscape scheme selected in 2006 used a taijitu-inspired composition divided into eastern and western sections, with the Sun and Immortal Bird as a central visual motif and additional imagery drawn from the Jinsha and Sanxingdui archaeological cultures.

The reconstructed square was substantially complete by 2007. Its eastern half contains a sunken plaza, while the western half is dominated by fountains. The design also includes dragon-themed water sculptures, cultural columns, and other decorative elements referring to the history and landscape of Sichuan.

== Surroundings ==
Tianfu Square forms part of a concentration of provincial and municipal cultural institutions in central Chengdu. The Sichuan Science and Technology Museum occupies the former exhibition hall on its northern side. Nearby institutions include the Chengdu Museum, the Sichuan Provincial Library, the Sichuan Art Museum, and the Sichuan Grand Theater. Sichuan provincial authorities have described the area around the square as a major public cultural area.

The square itself is open to the public and is used for recreation, tourism, civic displays and public events. Its present landscaping incorporates the Sun and Immortal Bird emblem, based on a gold ornament excavated at Jinsha that has become a prominent symbol of Chengdu's ancient Shu heritage.

== Metro transport ==
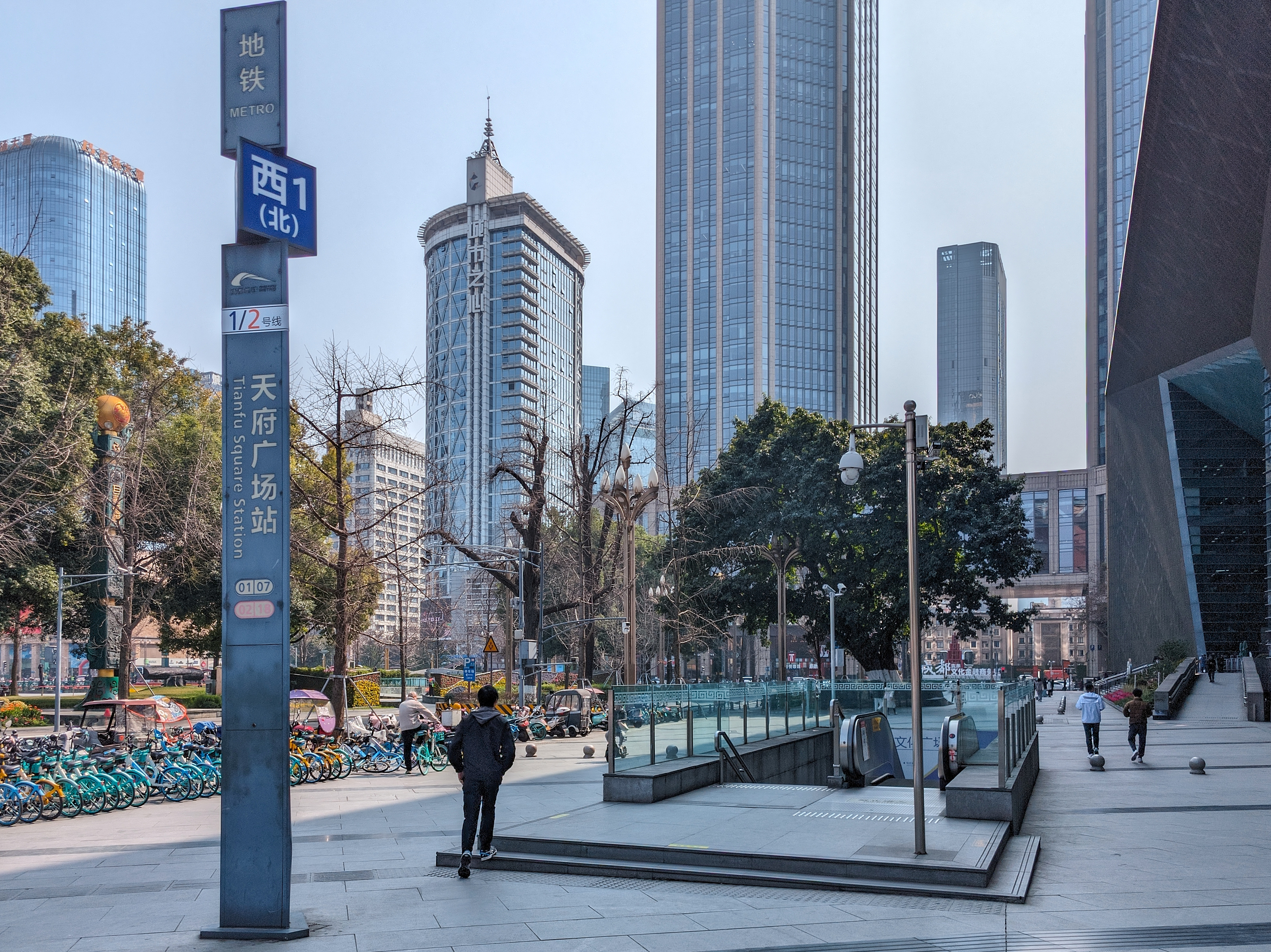
Tianfu Square Station West exit

Tianfu Square station is directly beneath the square and is an interchange metro station between Line 1 and Line 2 of the Chengdu Metro. Line 1, Chengdu's first metro line, opened on 27 September 2010 and included Tianfu Square station. Line 2 began operation through the station on 16 September 2012, making Tianfu Square an interchange station between Chengdu's principal north–south and east–west metro corridors.

The underground complex also connects to commercial and pedestrian spaces beneath the square. Together with the surrounding bus routes and arterial streets, the metro station reinforces the square's role as a major transport node in central Chengdu.

== See also ==
- Tianfu Square station
