= Tonganosaurus =

Tonganosaurus Temporal range: Pliensbachian ~184.5 Ma

Scientific classification
- Kingdom: Animalia
- Phylum: Chordata
- Class: Reptilia
- Clade: Dinosauria
- Clade: Saurischia
- Clade: †Sauropodomorpha
- Clade: †Sauropoda
- Family: †Mamenchisauridae
- Genus: †Tonganosaurus; Li et al., 2010
- Species: †T. hei

Binomial name
- †Tonganosaurus hei Li et al., 2010

Extinct genus of dinosaurs

Tonganosaurus (named for the town of Tong'an, Sichuan where it was found) is a genus of mamenchisaurid sauropod dinosaur, similar to Omeisaurus. It is known from one specimen consisting of twenty vertebrae, a front limb and pectoral girdle, and a complete hind limb with partial hip. It was discovered in the Yimen Formation, China. The horizon of the specimen and the age of the Yimen Formation is controversial. The formation has been divided into three levels, and Tonganosaurus appears to be of late Early Jurassic (Pliensbachian) in age. Tonganosaurus is the oldest known member of the mamenchisaurids, being almost 15 million years older than the next-oldest members of the group. It was first named by Li Kui, Yang Chun-Yan, Liu Jian, and Wang Zheng-Xin in 2010, and the type species is Tonganosaurus hei.

== Description ==
The ratio of the front and rear limbs is 0.80. The tibia was straight and thick, with a length 75% that of the femur. The holotype is an incomplete skeleton of an adult sauropod. The skeleton of Tonganosaurus has been calculated in size, using Omeisaurus as reference, at 11.6 metres (38 ft) long. In life, it was probably a little bigger, about 12 metres (39 ft).

== History of discovery ==
In 2007, the Chengdu University of Technology Museum based on information gathered from citizen scientists, searched for dinosaurs in Tongan Town, Huili County, Sichuan Province. They found the fossils of Tonganosaurus in the middle of the lower part of the Yimen Formation, whose age is estimated on 184.5 Ma. The fossils included about 20 vertebrae, a complete right shoulder blade and right forelimb, a distal left humerus, intact left and right ischia, a left femur, and complete right hind limb, and more than 10 scattered cervical vertebrae, ribs, tibia and claw bones. The fossils were collected in the same general area and were proportional, so they were believed to belong to the same animal. Being the first representative of the family Mamenchisauridae implies a high diversity of sauropods in the late Early Jurassic. The specimen was kept at Chengdu University of Technology Museum, with the number MCDUT 14454.

== Paleoenvironment ==
Tonganosaurus holotype comes from the Upper section of the Yimen Formation, being associated with Brontopodus tracks with also Mamenchisaurid resemblance, that maybe were made by this taxon. These layers are also filled with Ostracodans (Darwinula), Stoneworts, Bivalves (Utschamiella and Sibireconcha) and Conchostracans. The Stonewort assemblage is dominated by the genus Aclistochara (A. nuguishanensis, A. yunnanensis) associated with elements of Porochara and sporadic individuals of Stenochara, suggesting shallow-deep lake and flood environments. Apart from Tonganosaurus, Sauropodomorph remains where uncovered, likely similar to Yunnanosaurus of the same age.
