= Memorial for Chairman Mao's inspection of the North Park Commune =

- 毛主席视察北园公社纪念地
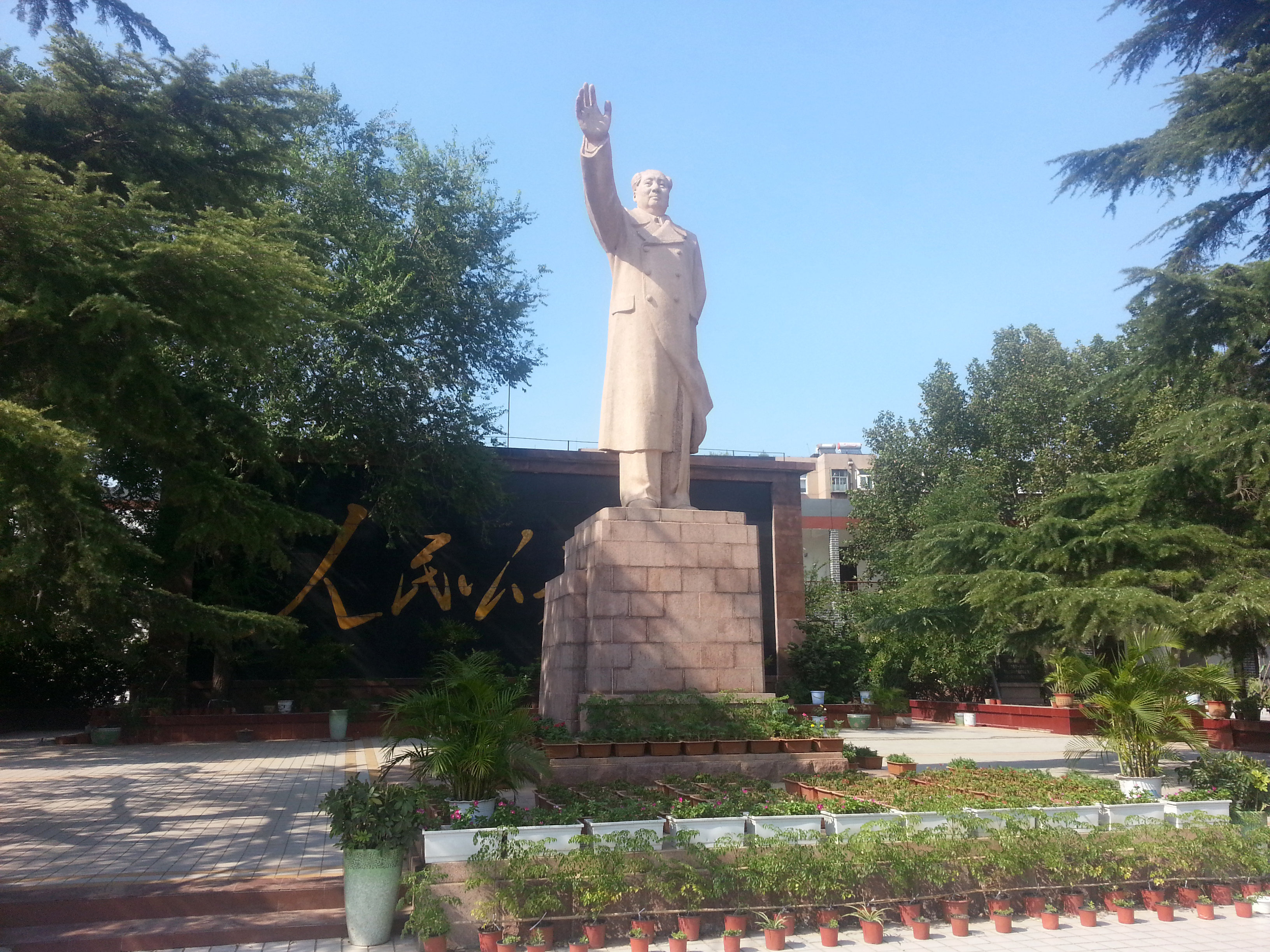
- Mao sculpture in the center of the memorial.
- Interactive map of Memorial for Chairman Mao's inspection of the North Park Commune
- Location: Jinan, Shandong, China
- Coordinates: 36.69422°N 117.02075°E
- Type: Memorial
- Dedicated to: An inspection visit by Mao Zedong

The Memorial for Chairman Mao's Inspection of the North Park Commune (Chinese: 毛主席视察北园公社纪念地; pinyin: Máo Zhǔxí shìchá Běiyuán gōngshè jìniàndì) is a historical site in the City of Jinan, Shandong, China. The memorial commemorates an inspection visit by Mao Zedong on August 9, 1958, during a tour of the provinces Hebei, Henan. The purpose of the tour was to promote the idea of the People's Commune. During this visit, Mao made the statement "People's Communes are good" (Chinese: 人民公社好; pinyin: Rénmín gōngshè hǎo) which triggered the collectivization in the Great Leap Forward. The North Park Commune was organized on August 20, 1958, a few days after Mao's visit, as the first People's Commune in Shandong.

The site is located on the grounds of the North Park Middle School (北园中学) in Shuitun Village (水屯村), Tianqiao District. It consists of a larger-than-life statue of Mao Zedong positioned in front of an inscription with his remark ("People's Communes are good"). It was inscribed as a historical site protected by Shandong Province in December 1977 (site number 1-01).

== See also ==
- List of statues of Mao Zedong
- List of sites in Jinan
- Major historical and cultural sites protected by Shandong Province
