= Statue of Mao Zedong, Chengdu =

Mao Zedong Statue, Chengdu
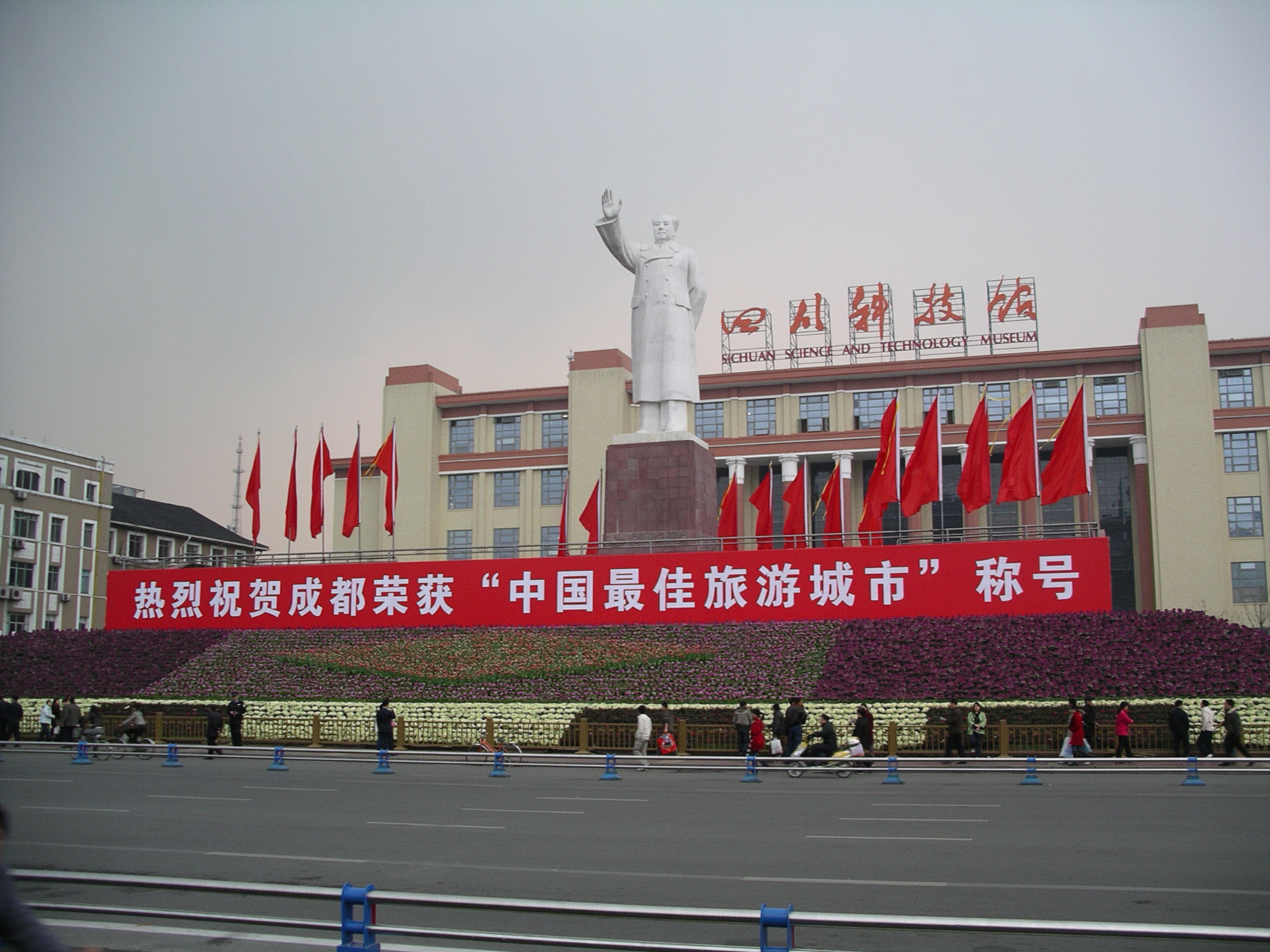
- Statue in front of the Sichuan Science and Technology Museum
- Interactive map of Mao Zedong Statue, Chengdu
- Location: Chengdu, Sichuan, China
- Coordinates: 30°39′41″N 104°03′48″E
- Type: Statue
- Material: Marble
- Height: 30 metres (98 ft)
- Completion date: 1968

The Mao Zedong Statue is a marble sculpture located in Tianfu Square, Chengdu, Sichuan, China. The monument stands 30 m (98.4 ft) tall and depicts Mao Zedong with an outstretched arm. Before 1967, the site was occupied by an ancient palace from the Shu Kingdom of ancient Sichuan. The palace was destroyed by Red Guards and the moat around it filled in to make an air raid shelter in 1967.

== See also ==
- List of statues of Mao Zedong
- List of tallest statues
