= Chengdu Huangcheng Mosque =

Mosque in Chengdu, Sichuan, China

- 成都皇城清真寺
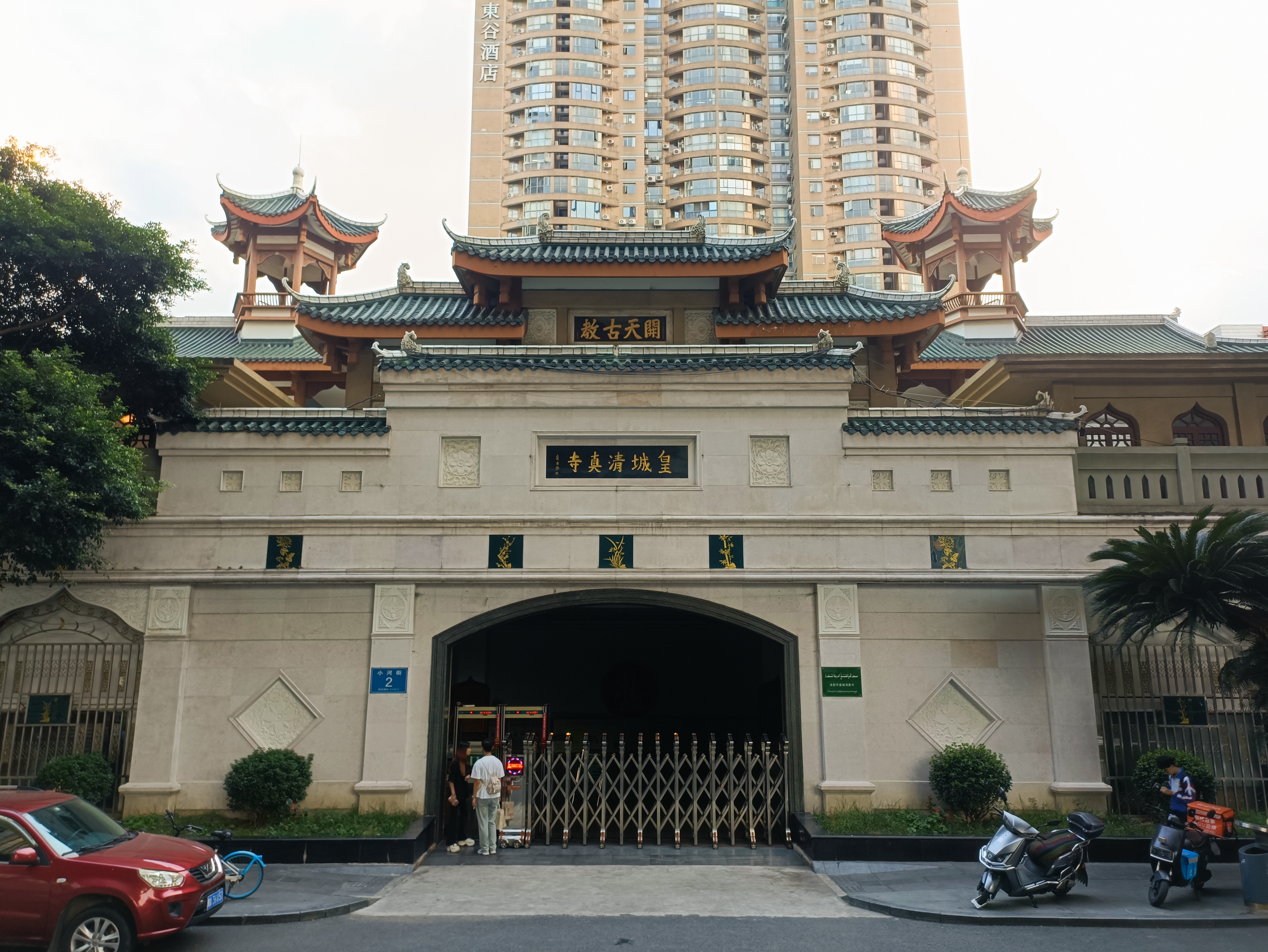

- Location of the mosque in Sichuan

Religion
- Affiliation: Sunni Islam
- Ecclesiastical or organizational status: Mosque
- Status: Active

Location
- Location: 2 Xiaohe Street, Qingyang, Chengdu, Sichuan
- Country: China
- Interactive map of Chengdu Huangcheng Mosque
- Coordinates: 30°39′33″N 104°3′38″E

Architecture
- Type: Mosque
- Style: Islamic, Ming, Qing
- Completed: 16th century CE (original); 1998 (rebuilt)
- Demolished: 1917 (since rebuilt)

Chinese name
- Simplified Chinese: 成都皇城清真寺
- Traditional Chinese: 成都皇城清真寺
- Literal meaning: Mosque in the Imperial City Wall of Chengdu
Transcriptions
Standard Mandarin
- Hanyu Pinyin: Chéngdū Huángchéng Qīngzhēnsì

The Chengdu Huangcheng Mosque (Chinese: 成都皇城清真寺; pinyin: Chéngdū Huángchéng Qīngzhēnsì; lit. 'Mosque in the Imperial City Wall of Chengdu') is a mosque in Qingyang District, Chengdu, in the Sichuan province of China. It is the largest mosque in Sichuan.

== Name ==
Huangcheng means Palace Wall, and the mosque is located near a palace of a dynasty in the local history of Sichuan.

== History ==
The mosque was constructed in the 16th century CE. It was first rebuilt in 1858. In 1917 it was heavily damaged during a war. Subsequently, the size of the mosque was reduced from 660 square metres (7,100 sq ft) to 5,000 square metres (54,000 sq ft) due to financial pressures. The mosque stands at its current site since November 1998.

== Architecture ==
The mosque was constructed with the combination of Islamic, Ming, Qing architectural styles. It consists of the entrance wall, gates, bathroom, library and the main prayer hall. The library consists of Islamic books written in Arabic and Chinese languages. On the first gate, there is a tablet with the name of the mosque. On the second gate, there is a tablet with four Chinese characters Kai Tian Gu Jiao (lit. 'the most ancient religion'), which was made during the Qing dynasty. The mosque houses the headquarters of the Islamic Association of Sichuan Province.

== Transportation ==
The mosque is accessible within walking distance west of Tianfu Square station of Chengdu Metro.

== See also ==
- Islam in Sichuan
- List of mosques in China
