= Tianfu Square station =

Chengdu metro transfer station

Tianfu Square 天府广场
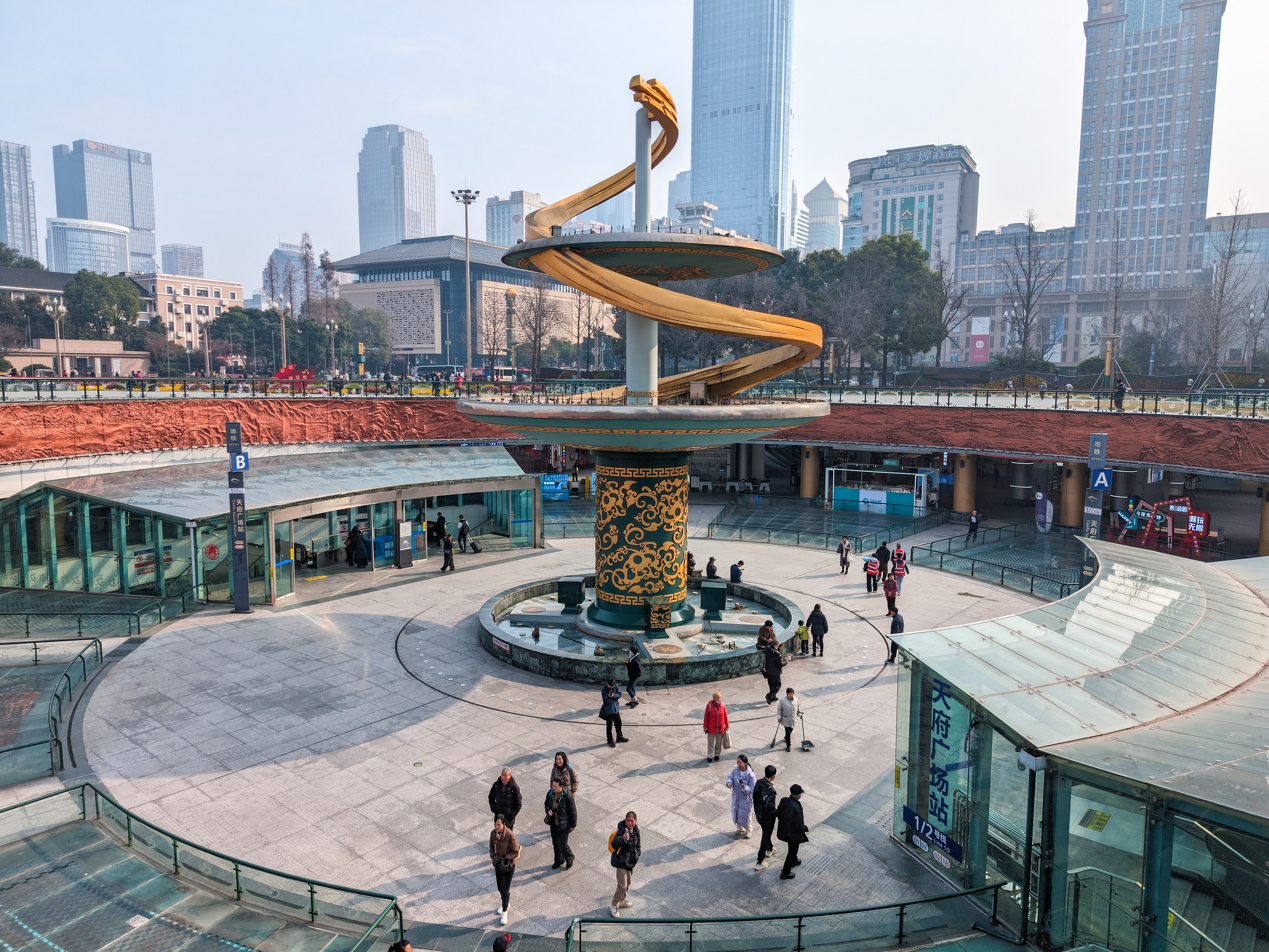
- Station entrance

General information
- Location: Qingyang, Chengdu, Sichuan; China
- Coordinates: 30.65997°N 104.06334°E
- Operator: Chengdu Metro Limited
- Lines: Line 1; Line 2
- Platforms: 6 (2 island platforms, 2 side platforms)

Other information
- Station code: 0107 0218

History
- Opened: 27 September 2010

Services
Preceding station	Chengdu Metro	Following station
Luomashi towards Weijianian	Line 1	Jinjiang Hotel towards Science City or Wugensong
Chunxi Road towards Longquanyi	Line 2	People's Park towards Xipu Railway Station
Location

Tianfu Square station (Chinese: 天府广场站; pinyin: Tiānfǔ Guǎngchǎng zhàn) is an interchange metro station of the Chengdu Metro on Lines 1 and 2. It is named after Tianfu Square it serves.

== Station layout ==
G	Entrances and Exits	Exits A-H, J
B1	Concourse	Faregates, Station Agent
B2	Side platform, doors open on the right
B2	Northbound	← Line 1 towards Weijianian (Luomashi)
B2	Island platform, doors open on the left
B2	Southbound	Line 1 towards Science City (Jinjiang Hotel) →
B2	Side platform, doors open on the right
B3	Westbound	← Line 2 towards Xipu (People's Park)
B3	Island platform, doors open on the left
B3	Eastbound	Line 2 towards Longquanyi (Chunxi Road) →

== Around the station ==
- Tianfu Square
- Chengdu Huangcheng Mosque

== Gallery ==
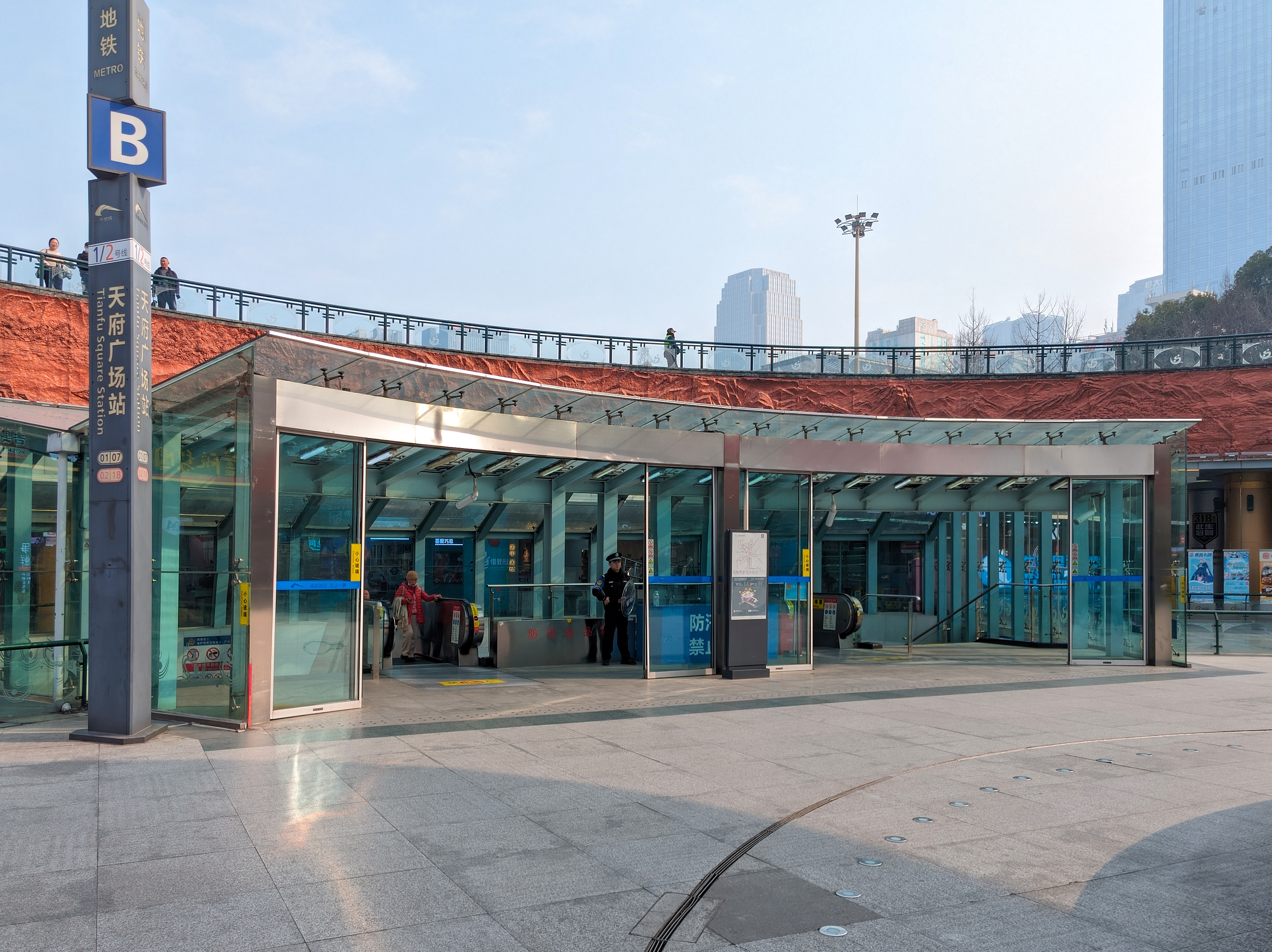
Exit B

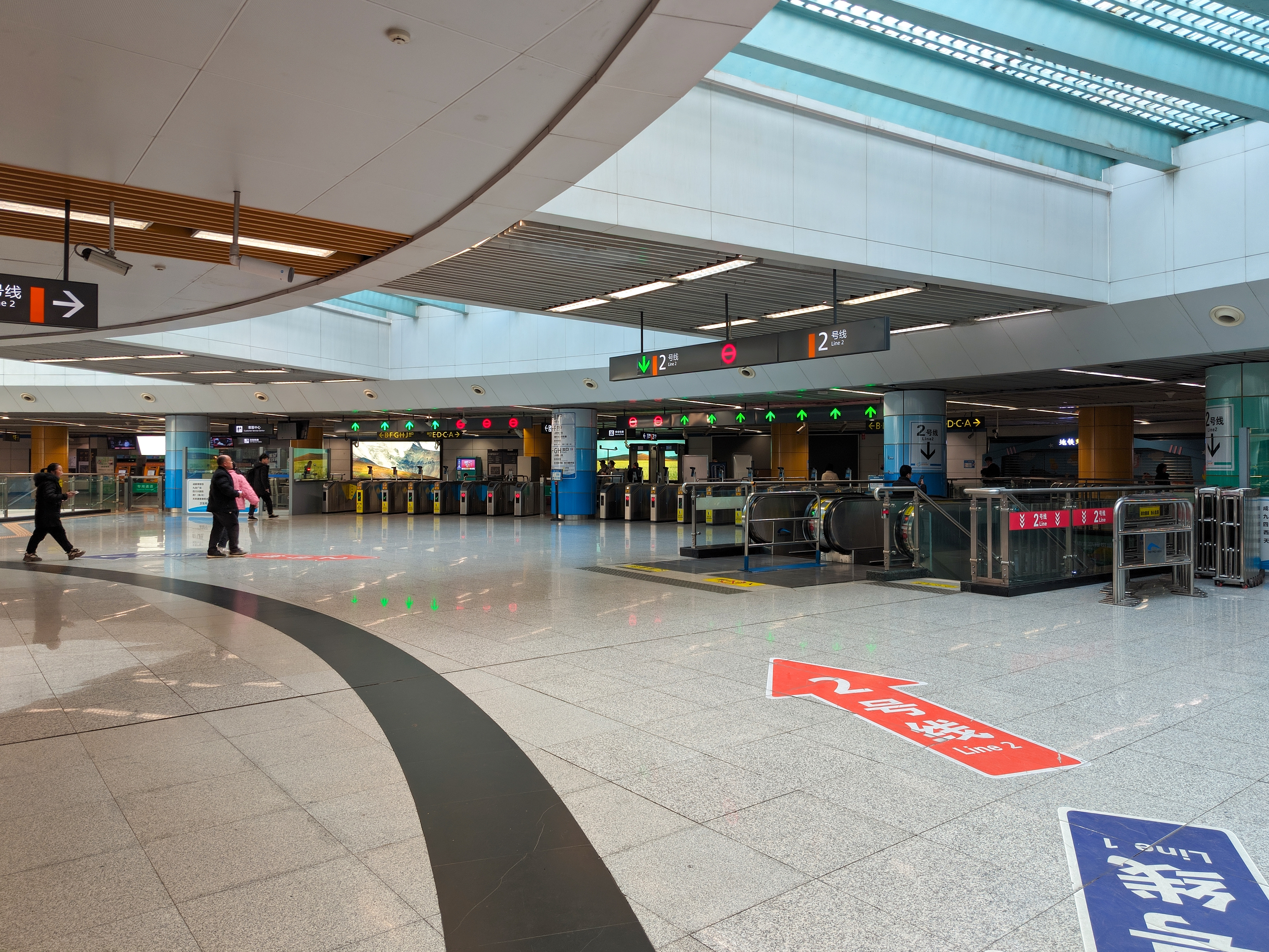
Concourse

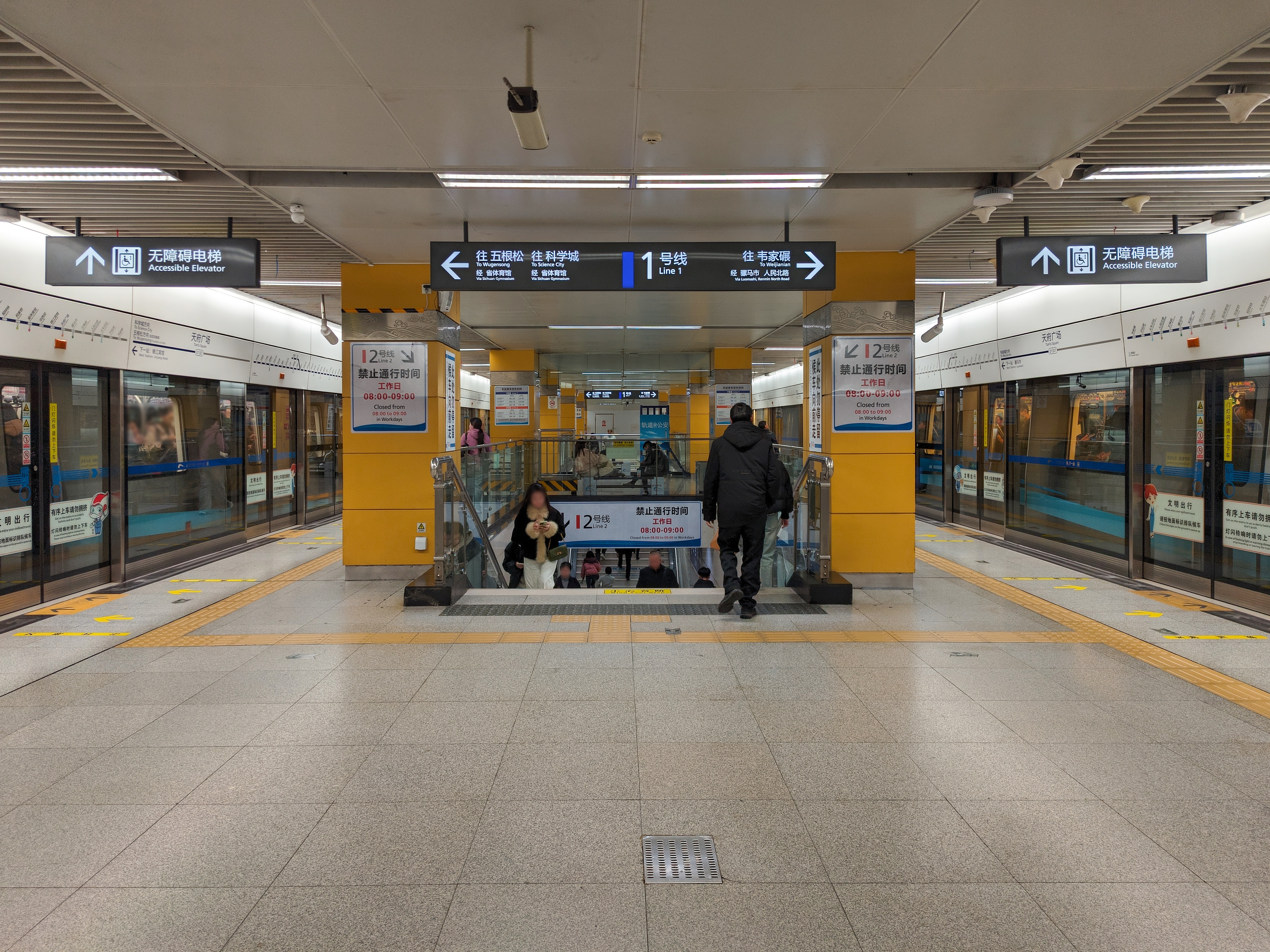
Line 1 platform

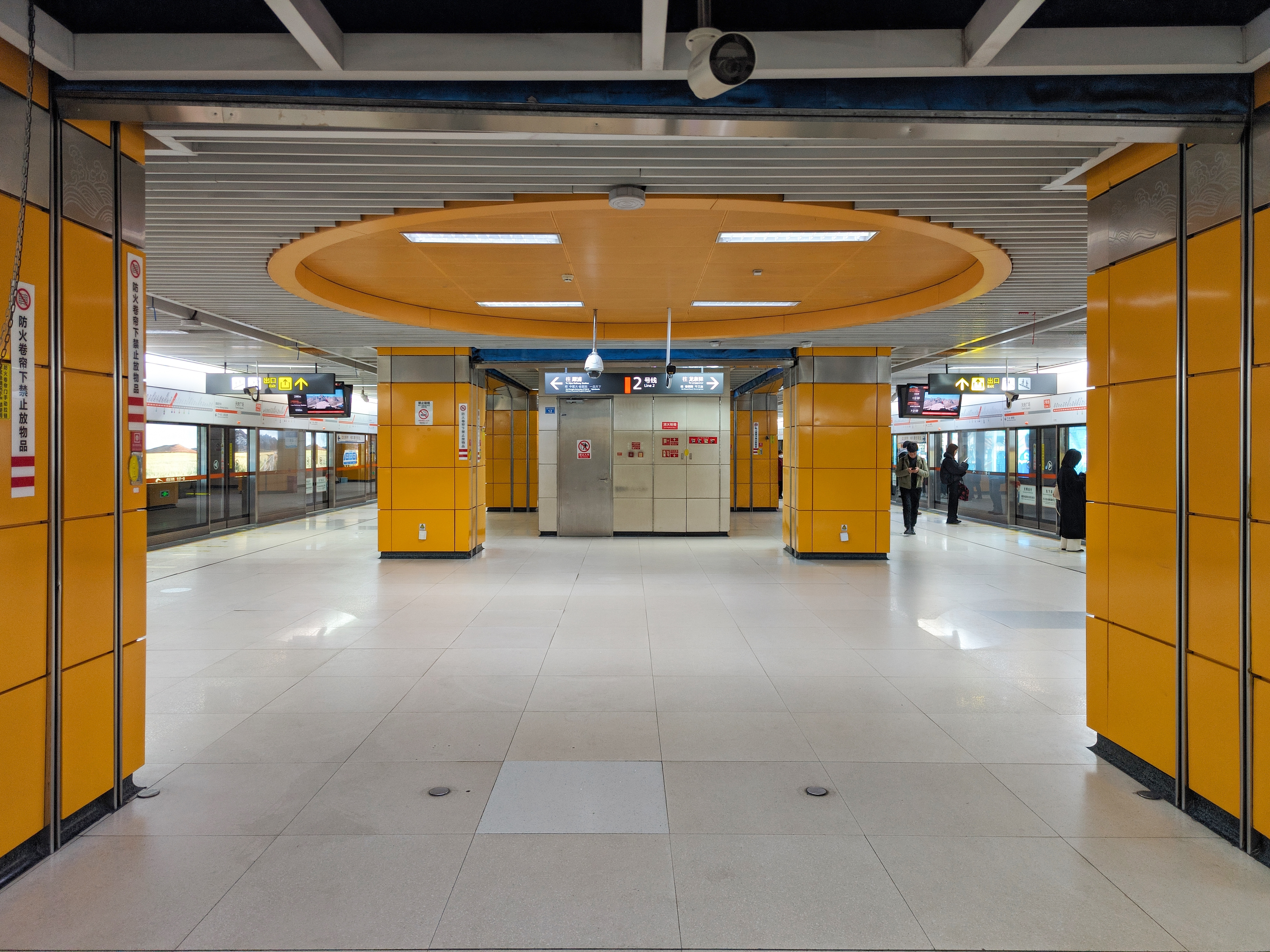
Line 2 platform
