= Chengdu Museum =

Coordinates: 30°39′35″N 104°03′40″E

- 成都博物馆
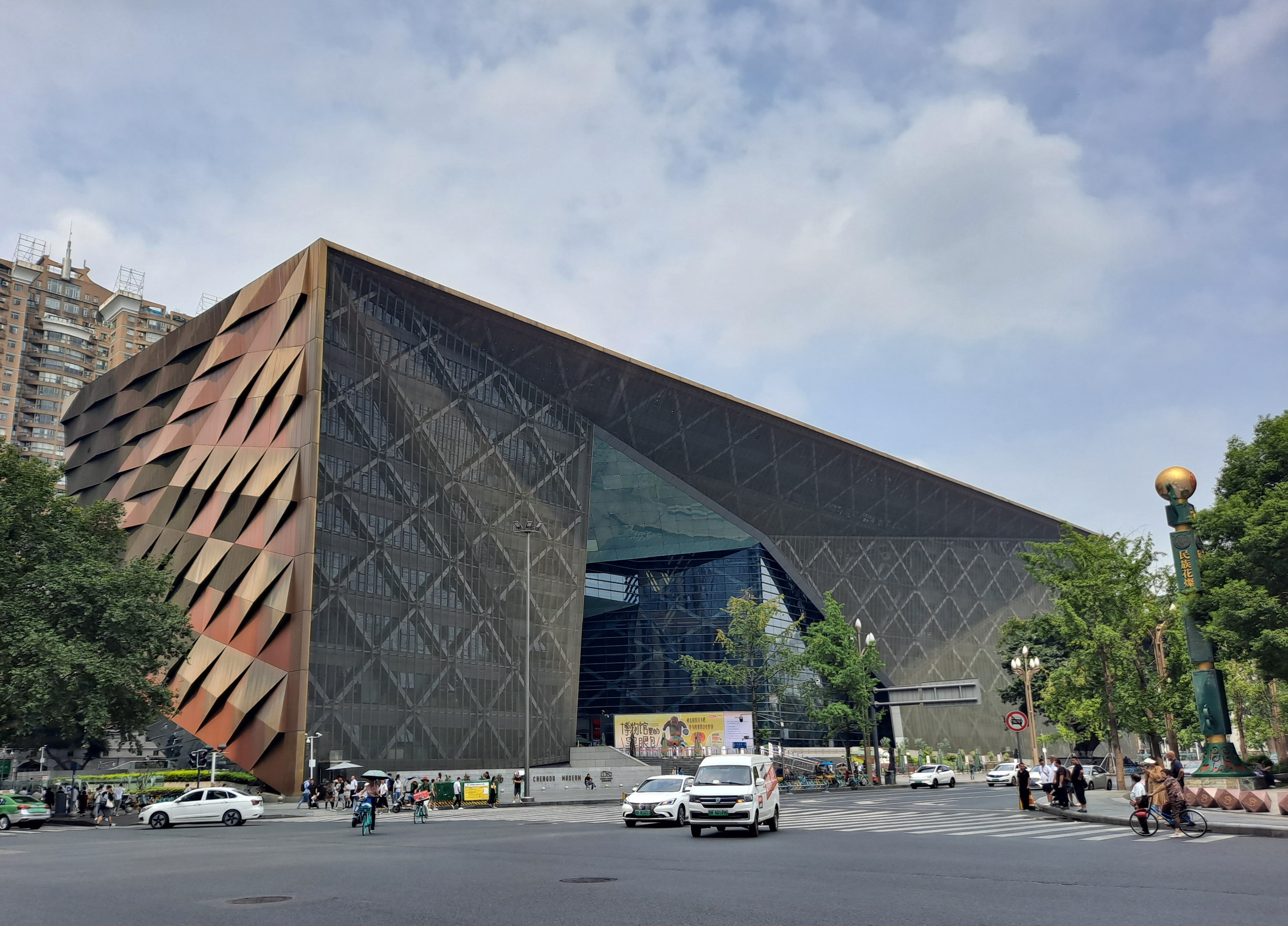
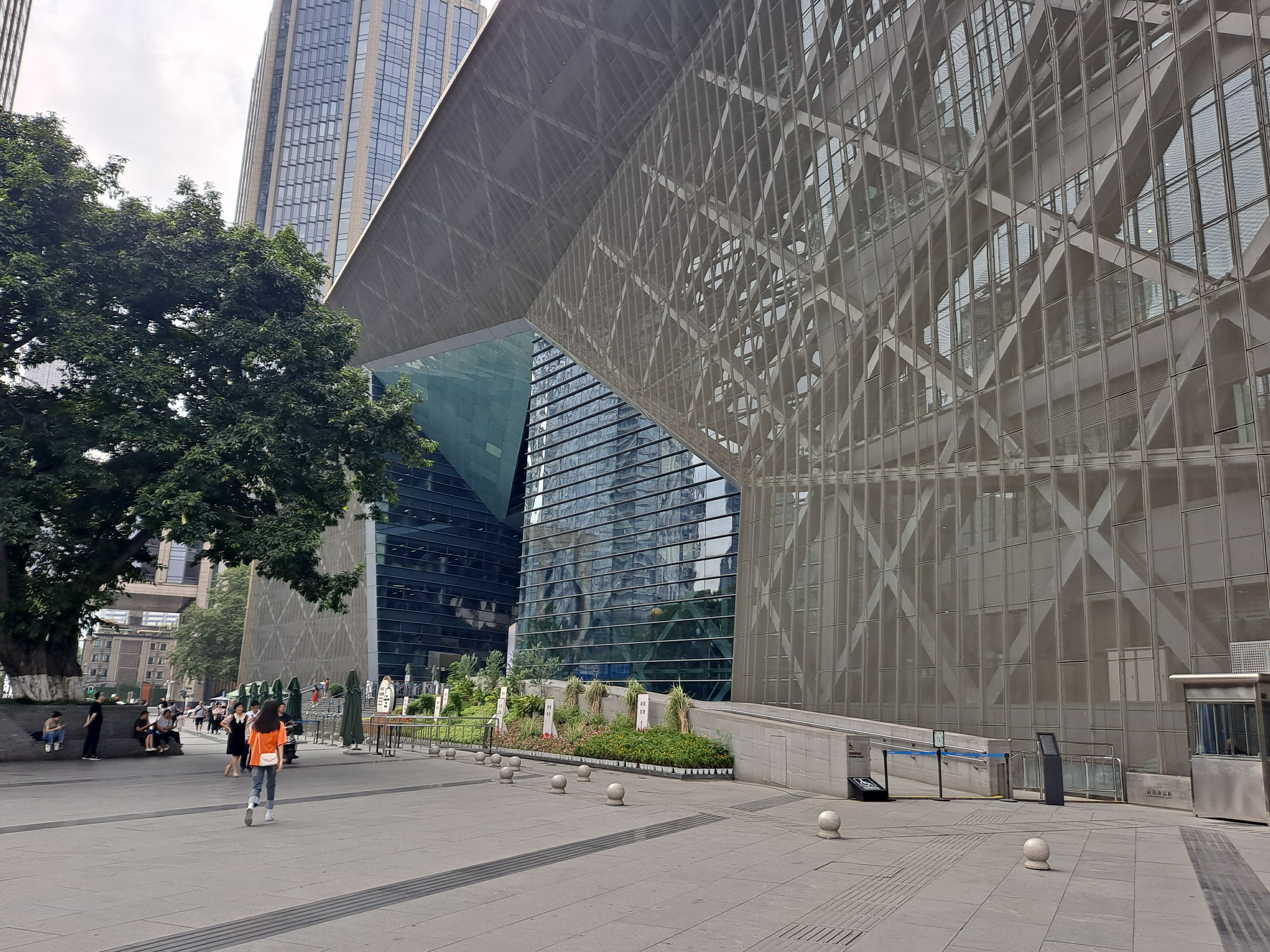
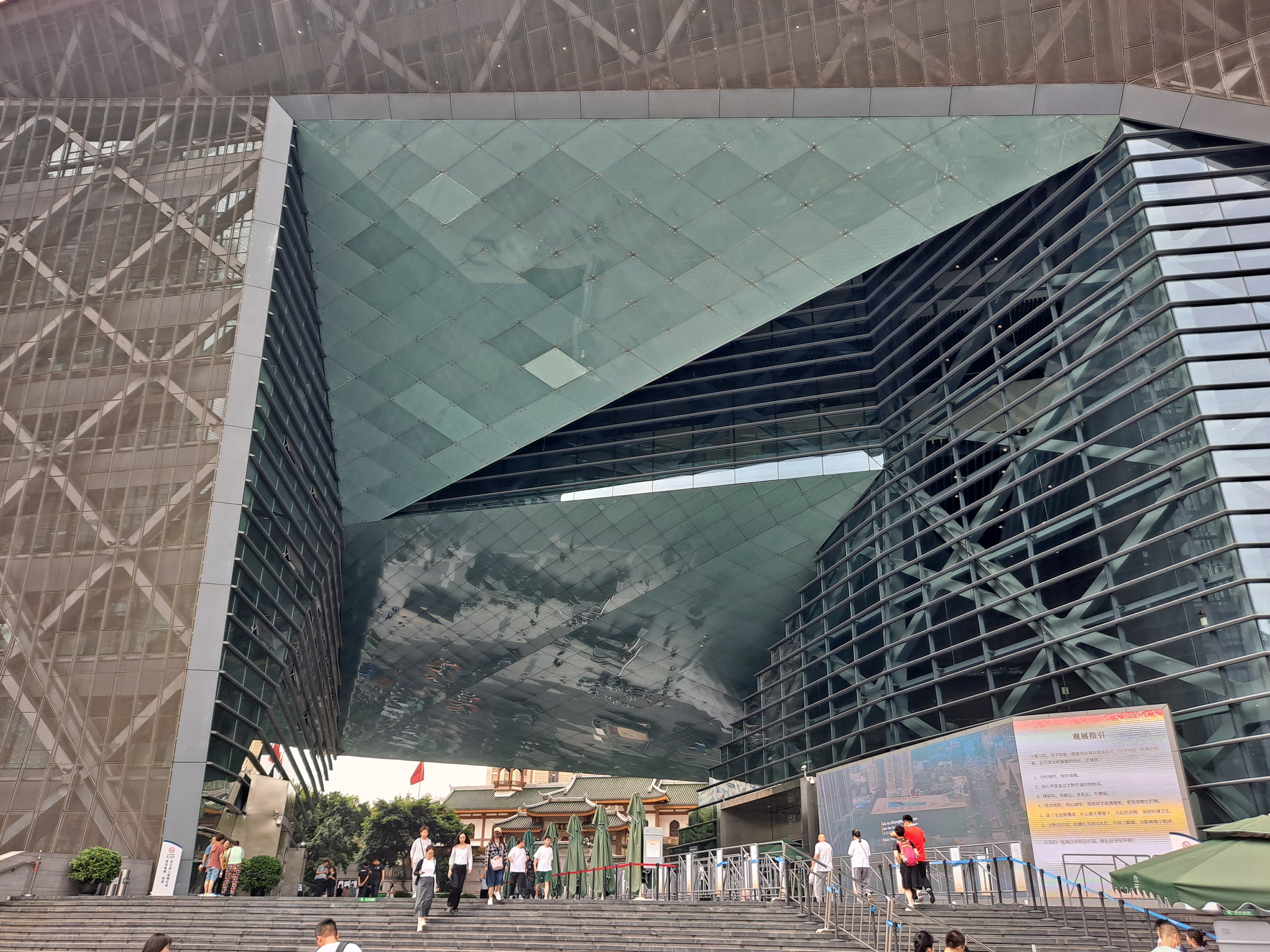
- Former name: Chengdu Topographical Museum
- Established: 1984
- Location: 1 Xiaohe Street, Qingyang District, Chengdu, China
- Type: City museum
- Collections: Historical artifacts, puppetry, wood carvings
- Collection size: c.200,000
- Founder: Chengdu Topographical Museum Preparatory Committee
- Director: Li Jieren (from 1958)
- Architect: Sutherland Hussey Harris
- Website: cdmuseum.com (in Chinese)

Chengdu Museum (Chinese: 成都博物馆) is a public municipal museum in Chengdu, Sichuan, China.

The museum is located on the west side of Tianfu Square, close to the Jincheng Art Palace, Sichuan Art Museum, Sichuan Provincial Library, and Sichuan Science and Technology Museum.

== History ==
On 15 September 1958, the Chengdu Municipal Government, under the direction of the Ministry of Culture to prepare for the formation of a museum, established the Chengdu Topographical Museum Preparatory Committee, located at Daci Temple. The deputy mayor, the writer Li Jieren, was the director of the committee. The committee eventually led to the opening of Chengdu Museum in 1984, housed at Daci Temple.

In 2007, the architects Sutherland Hussey Harris, together with Pansolution, based in Beijing, won the first prize in an international competition to design a new city museum for Chengdu. The museum building was completed in 2016 with a floor area of 65,000 m^{2} and named Chengdu Museum New Hall.

== Collections ==
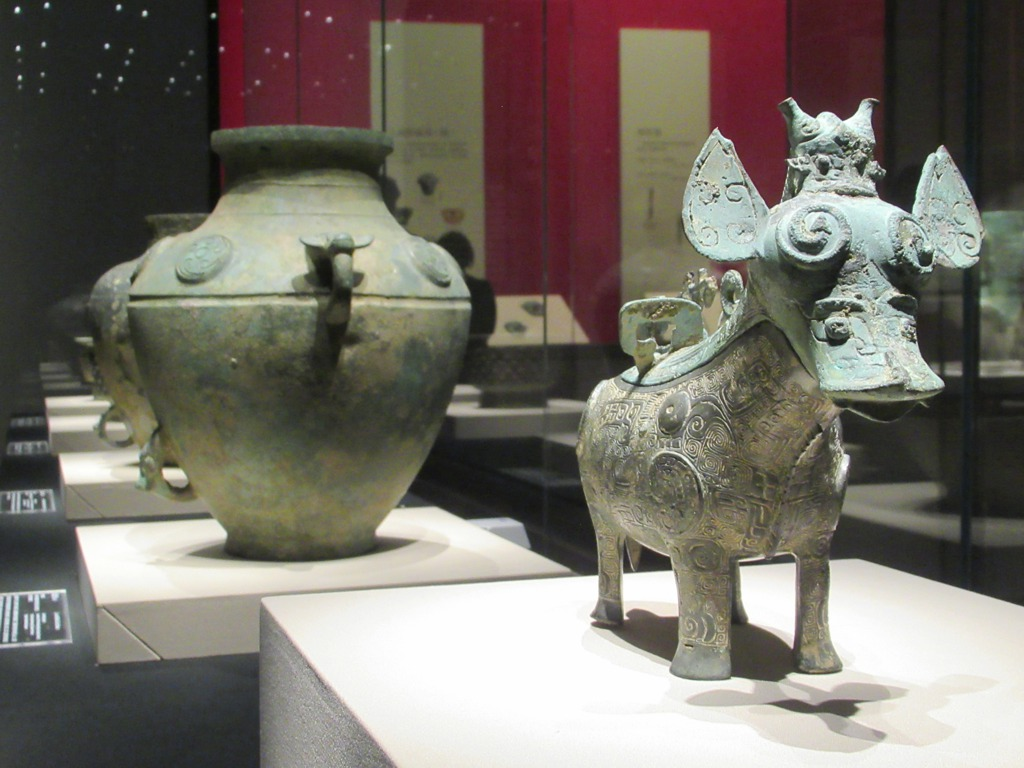
Bronze artefacts on display in the museum

The museum has six floors displaying historic artifacts. It has exhibitions of puppetry, shadow puppets, and wood carvings. The museum is the largest comprehensive museum in Chengdu with nearly 200,000 objects in its collections, covering a time period from the Neolithic period to that of the Republic of China.

== Transport ==
The museum is accessible by the Tianfu Square Station of Chengdu Metro Line 1 and Line 2.

== See also ==
- Chengdu Museum of Contemporary Art
