= Sichuan Science and Technology Museum =

Science museum in Chengdu, Sichuan, China

- 四川科技馆
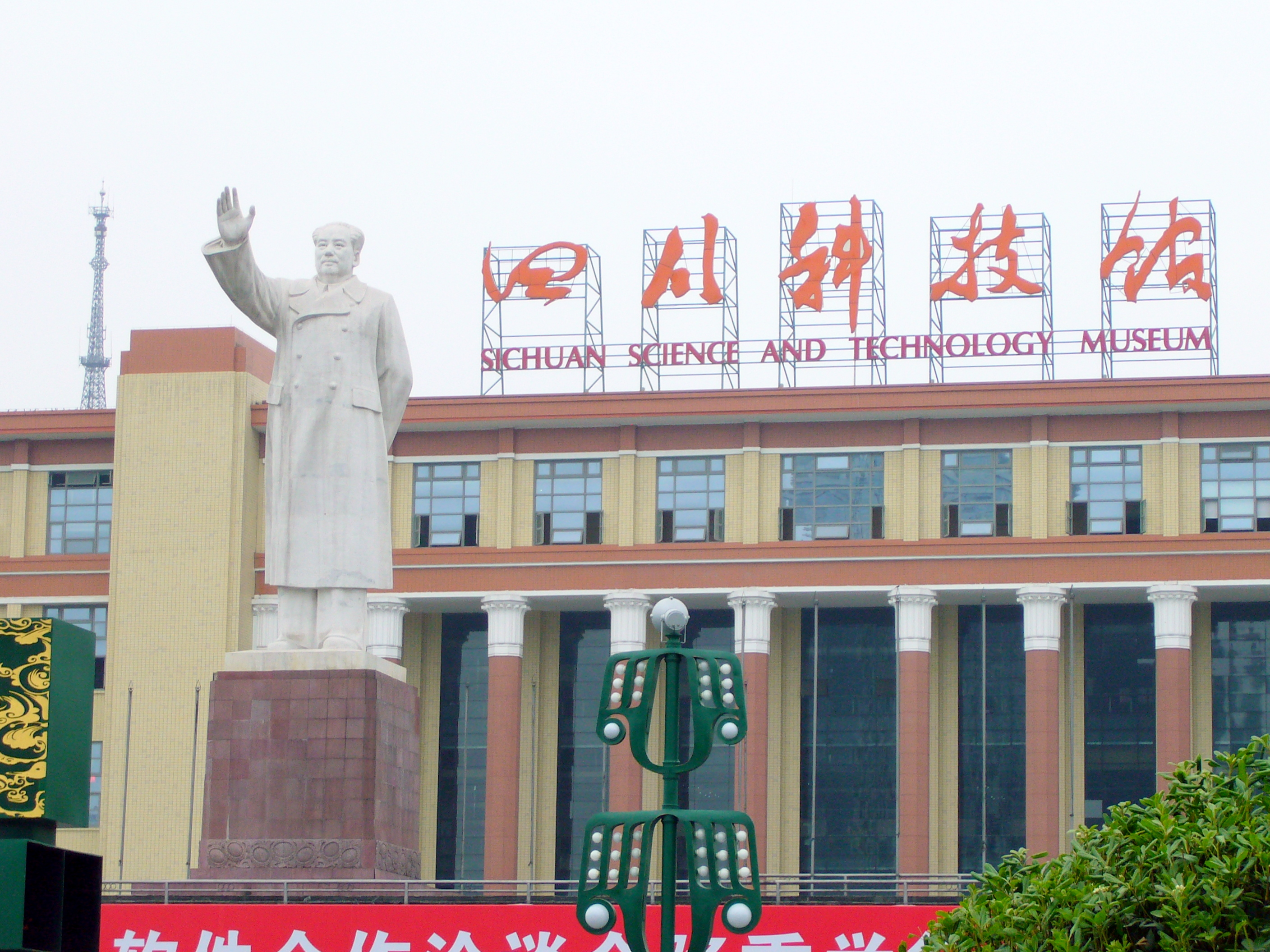
- Statue of Mao Zedong in front of the museum

- Location within Sichuan
- Established: November 2, 2006; 19 years ago
- Location: Qingyang, Chengdu, Sichuan, China
- Coordinates: 30.6624°N 104.0632°E
- Owner: Sichuan Provincial People's Government
- Website: scstm.com

The Sichuan Science and Technology Museum (SCSTM; Chinese: 四川科技馆) is a provincial public science museum in central Chengdu, Sichuan, China. It is owned and funded by the Sichuan Provincial People's Government. The museum is located immediately north of Tianfu Square in Qingyang District. It has a floor area of approximately 41,800 m^{2} (450,000 sq ft), of which about 25,000 m^{2} (270,000 sq ft) is used for exhibitions.

The museum opened on 2 November 2006 after the provincial government converted the exhibition hall into a facility for public science education. Its permanent exhibitions use interactive displays to present subjects including aerospace, physics, mathematics, mechanical engineering, robotics, life sciences, ecology, disaster preparedness, transportation, and the science and engineering of Sichuan.

== History ==
The building occupied by the museum was constructed as a large exhibition hall and was completed in October 1969. It later operated as the Sichuan Provincial Exhibition Hall (四川省展览馆) and was used for exhibitions and other public events in central Chengdu.

In early 2004, the Sichuan provincial government decided to convert the exhibition hall into a science and technology museum as one of the province's major public cultural projects. The resulting Sichuan Science and Technology Museum formally opened on 2 November 2006. It was intended as a comprehensive venue for science popularization and public science education.

The museum began offering its basic exhibitions and public science-education services free of charge on 1 May 2015, as part of a national program to introduce free admission at science museums operated through China's science and technology associations.

The museum subsequently closed for a major renovation lasting more than 400 days during 2016 and 2017. The project cost approximately CN¥120 million and substantially renewed its permanent exhibitions. Following the renovation, the first three floors were organized around three broad groups of themes concerning the sky, water, and the future; knowledge, intelligence, and technological development; and life, survival, and everyday living.

On 30 March 2022, the museum was designated a National Science Popularization Education Base (全国科普教育基地) by the China Association for Science and Technology.

== Exhibitions and education ==
The permanent exhibitions emphasize hands-on and interactive science education. Major subjects include aviation and spaceflight, the scientific principles of the Dujiangyan irrigation system, mathematics and mechanics, acoustics and optics, electromagnetism, machinery, robotics, virtual technology, life sciences, disaster prevention, environmental science, health, and transportation.

When the renovated museum was presented in 2017, it contained 16 permanent exhibition zones, 360 exhibits or exhibit groups, and four specialized theaters: a 4D film theater, a future-oriented theater, a robot theater, and a theater concerned with the origins of life. Continued additions and renewal subsequently increased the number of exhibits. Xinhua reported in 2025 that the first three floors retained 16 exhibition zones but contained more than 700 exhibits.

The fourth floor contains a youth science-education center emphasizing interdisciplinary STEAM education, with maker activities, science demonstrations, reading facilities, and other practical-learning programs. The museum also hosts exhibitions on scientists associated with Sichuan. A permanent corridor honoring notable Sichuan scientists was established in 2021, and a further exhibition on scientific achievement and the scientific spirit opened in 2025.

Public outreach extends beyond the museum itself through school programs and traveling science exhibitions. In 2025, Xinhua reported that the museum received more than one million visitors annually, conducted more than 6,000 in-house science-popularization activities a year, organized more than 100 school outreach activities, and participated in traveling science-museum programs at more than 20 locations annually.

== See also ==
- Chengdu Museum
- Chengdu Natural History Museum
- List of museums in China
