= Tianhu, Henan =

Tianhu 田湖镇
- Town
- Location in Henan
- Coordinates: 34°14′7″N 112°11′49″E
- Country: People's Republic of China
- Province: Henan
- Prefecture-level city: Luoyang
- County: Song County
- Time zone: UTC+8 (China Standard)

Tianhu (Chinese: 田湖; pinyin: Tiánhú) is a town under the administration of Song County, Henan, China. As of 2023, it administers Fengyang Residential Community (凤阳社区) the following 30 villages:

- Tianhu Village
- Fandian Village (樊店村)
- Shiyuan Village (柿元村)
- Yaoshang Village (窑上村)
- Saluo Village (洒落村)
- Gucheng Village (古城村)
- Pugou Village (铺沟村)
- Shangwan Village (上湾村)
- Huangmen Village (黄门村)
- Zhangzhuang Village (张庄村)
- Nan'an Village (南安村)
- Pei Village (裴村)
- Yuling Village (于岭村)
- Cuiyuan Village (崔元村)
- Nanwa Village (南洼村)
- Tengwanggou Village (腾王沟村)
- Yaodian Village (窑店村)
- Dashiqiao Village (大石桥村)
- Xiawan Village (下湾村)
- Qianqiu Village (千秋村)
- Xinhedian Village (新和店村)
- Maozhuang Village (毛庄村)
- Xiejiagou Village (卸甲沟村)
- Cheng Village (程村)
- Xiao'antou Village (小安头村)
- Da'antou Village (大安头村)
- Gaotun Village (高屯村)
- Lutun Village (卢屯村)
- Pingfengzhuang Village (屏凤庄村)
- Yangwan Village (杨湾村)
