= Song County =

Song County 嵩县
- County
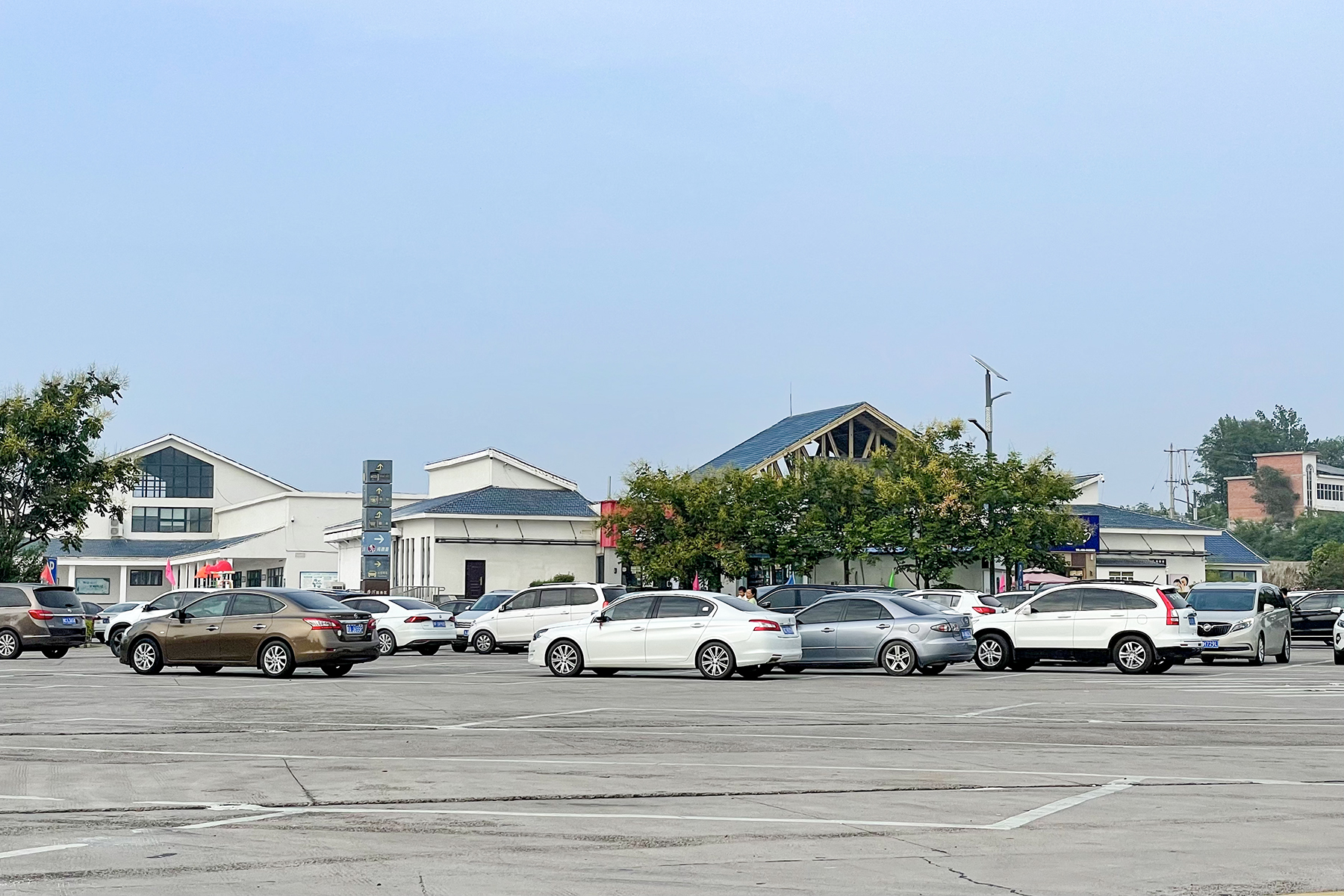

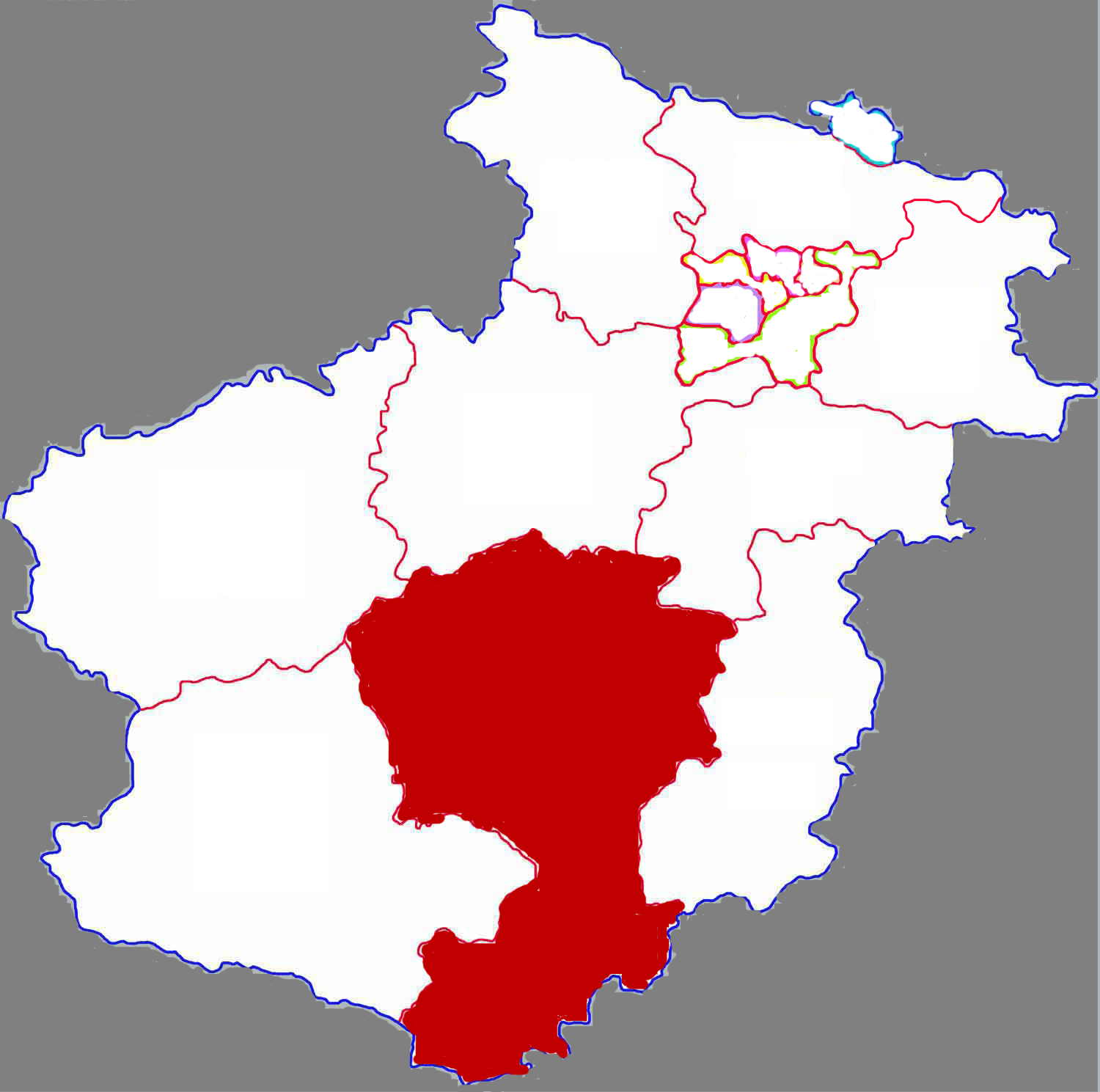
- Song County in Luoyang

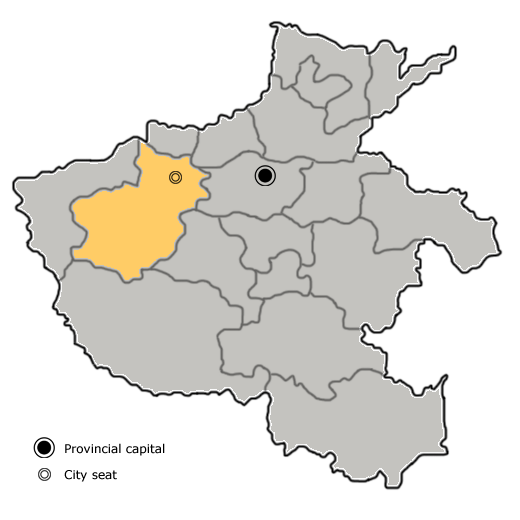
- Luoyang in Henan
- Coordinates: 34°08′04″N 112°05′08″E
- Country: People's Republic of China
- Province: Henan
- Prefecture-level city: Luoyang

Area
  - Total: 3,009 km^{2} (1,162 sq mi)

Population (2019)
  - Total: 521,400
  - Density: 173.3/km^{2} (448.8/sq mi)
- Time zone: UTC+8 (China Standard)
- Postal code: 471400

Song County or Songxian (Chinese: 嵩县; pinyin: Sōng Xiàn) is a county under the administration of the prefecture-level city of Luoyang, in the west of Henan Province, China. It contains the southernmost point of Luoyang's administrative area. It was the first capital of China during the Xia dynasty.

== Administrative divisions ==
As of 2012, this county is divided to 9 towns and 7 townships.

Towns

- Chengguan (城关镇)
- Tianhu (田湖镇)
- Jiuxian (旧县镇)
- Checun (车村镇)
- Yanzhuang (闫庄镇)
- Deting (德亭镇)
- Dazhang (大章镇)
- Baihe (白河镇)
- Zhifang (纸房镇)

Townships

- Daping Township (大坪乡)
- Kuqu Township (库区乡)
- Hecun Township (何村乡)
- Fanpo Township (饭坡乡)
- Jiudian Township (九店乡)
- Huangzhuang Township (黄庄乡)
- Muzhijie Township (木植街乡)

== Climate ==
Climate data for Songxian, elevation 326 m (1,070 ft), (1991–2020 normals, extremes 1981–2010)
Month	Jan	Feb	Mar	Apr	May	Jun	Jul	Aug	Sep	Oct	Nov	Dec	Year
Record high °C (°F)	21.1 (70.0)	27.6 (81.7)	31.0 (87.8)	37.9 (100.2)	40.4 (104.7)	41.5 (106.7)	41.1 (106.0)	40.8 (105.4)	40.1 (104.2)	33.7 (92.7)	28.8 (83.8)	25.1 (77.2)	41.5 (106.7)
Mean daily maximum °C (°F)	7.0 (44.6)	10.5 (50.9)	15.9 (60.6)	23.4 (74.1)	27.9 (82.2)	32.2 (90.0)	32.5 (90.5)	30.7 (87.3)	26.6 (79.9)	21.9 (71.4)	15.3 (59.5)	9.2 (48.6)	21.1 (70.0)
Daily mean °C (°F)	0.9 (33.6)	4.3 (39.7)	9.4 (48.9)	16.4 (61.5)	21.3 (70.3)	25.6 (78.1)	27.0 (80.6)	25.4 (77.7)	20.9 (69.6)	15.5 (59.9)	8.8 (47.8)	3.0 (37.4)	14.9 (58.8)
Mean daily minimum °C (°F)	−3.1 (26.4)	−0.1 (31.8)	4.5 (40.1)	10.6 (51.1)	15.7 (60.3)	20.2 (68.4)	22.9 (73.2)	21.6 (70.9)	16.7 (62.1)	11.0 (51.8)	4.4 (39.9)	−1.0 (30.2)	10.3 (50.5)
Record low °C (°F)	−13.6 (7.5)	−12.7 (9.1)	−8.5 (16.7)	−1.4 (29.5)	5.7 (42.3)	11.3 (52.3)	12.3 (54.1)	13.2 (55.8)	7.8 (46.0)	−1.2 (29.8)	−6.7 (19.9)	−13.0 (8.6)	−13.6 (7.5)
Average precipitation mm (inches)	11.4 (0.45)	17.3 (0.68)	29.7 (1.17)	34.8 (1.37)	67.4 (2.65)	72.4 (2.85)	137.4 (5.41)	121.7 (4.79)	90.5 (3.56)	43.4 (1.71)	33.4 (1.31)	10.2 (0.40)	669.6 (26.35)
Average precipitation days (≥ 0.1 mm)	4.6	5.0	7.0	6.7	8.8	8.7	12.7	12.1	10.2	7.6	5.7	4.5	93.6
Average snowy days	4.8	3.7	2.1	0.3	0	0	0	0	0	0	1.4	3.7	16
Average relative humidity (%)	58	60	59	57	60	62	74	77	74	68	63	59	64
Mean monthly sunshine hours	154.8	145.2	176.5	211.0	215.3	214.1	191.4	180.5	158.2	164.1	155.6	152.0	2,118.7
Percentage possible sunshine	49	47	47	54	50	50	44	44	43	47	50	50	48
Source: China Meteorological Administration
