= Chengdu Natural History Museum =

Natural history museum in Chengdu, Sichuan, China

- 成都自然博物馆（成都理工大学博物馆）
- Established: 1960; 66 years ago
- Location: Chenghua, Chengdu, Sichuan, China
- Type: Natural history museum Public municipal museum
- Collections: Geology, mineralogy, paleontology, zoology, and botany
- Architects: Pelli Clarke & Partners; China Southwest Architectural Design and Research Institute
- Owners: Chengdu Municipal People's Government; Chengdu University of Technology
- Website: cdmnh.com

The Chengdu Natural History Museum (Chinese: 成都自然博物馆), concurrently known as the Museum of the Chengdu University of Technology (成都理工大学博物馆), is a public municipal natural history museum in Chengdu, Sichuan, China. It is jointly developed by the Chengdu municipal government and the Chengdu University of Technology (CDUT), and wholly funded by the municipal government. The museum grew out of CDUT's geological exhibition hall originally founded in 1960. The present museum building opened to the public in November 2022.

The museum focuses particularly on earth sciences and paleontology. Its collections include fossils, rocks, minerals, meteorites, and animal and plant specimens. Notable holdings include the type specimen of Mamenchisaurus hochuanensis, the Longchang iron meteorite, and a well-preserved fossil of the prehistoric fish Chungkingichthys tachuensis.

== History ==
The museum originated in the autumn of 1960, when the Chengdu College of Geology, the predecessor of the Chengdu University of Technology, established three geological exhibition rooms for teaching and the preservation of specimens. The rooms were consolidated in 1962 as the Chengdu College of Geology Exhibition Hall (成都地质学院陈列馆), which displayed rocks, minerals, mineral resources, and fossils and was used for student training as well as occasional public visits.

In 1961, the college received the type specimen of Mamenchisaurus hochuanensis, a large sauropod dinosaur discovered near present-day Hechuan, Chongqing, in 1957. After study by paleontologist Yang Zhongjian and colleagues, the skeleton was mounted in 1965. The museum expanded its exhibition space to accommodate it.

The exhibition hall was renamed the Museum of the Chengdu College of Geology in 1986. In 2001, following the college's university status reception and the subsequent renaming, the museum was renamed the Museum of the Chengdu University of Technology.

During the 2010s, the Chengdu municipal government and CDUT began developing a much larger public natural history museum based on the university collection. The project was jointly planned, constructed, and developed by the municipal government and the university. The new Chengdu Natural History Museum began trial operation on 22 November 2022 and opened to the public the following day. The museum is legally a public institution wholly funded by the Chengdu municipal government.

== Building and exhibitions ==
The museum stands next to the Chengdu University of Technology campus. The building has a floor area of approximately 50,600 m^{2} (545,000 sq ft), including about 17,000 m^{2} (180,000 sq ft) of exhibition space.

It was designed by the American architectural firm Pelli Clarke & Partners together with the China Southwest Architectural Design and Research Institute (中国建筑西南设计研究院). The building consists of angular stone-clad volumes inspired by the mountains of western Sichuan. The architects described the design as drawing on three regional themes, which are "Shu Mountains", "Shu Roads", and "Shu Water", with elevated walkways referring to historic mountain roads and the landscape incorporating waterways and reflecting pools.

There are six permanent exhibition halls: Geological Environment, Mineral Resources, Dinosaurs of Sichuan and Chongqing, Exploring Dinosaurs, Origins of Life, and Diversity of Life. The exhibitions cover geological processes, natural hazards, mineral resources, the origin and evolution of life, dinosaurs, and modern biodiversity. The museum also contains temporary-exhibition galleries and educational facilities.

== Collections ==
The museum holds more than 60,000 natural-history specimens and displays approximately 10,000 objects in its permanent exhibitions. Its collections reflect the geological research and fieldwork of the Chengdu University of Technology and are particularly strong in paleontology, mineralogy, and the geology of Sichuan and the wider region.

The best-known specimen is the type skeleton of Mamenchisaurus hochuanensis. More than 80 percent of its skeleton is preserved. Before the opening of the new museum, the mount underwent a major restoration based on subsequent paleontological discoveries; its reconstructed length increased from about 22 metres (72 ft) to 24 metres (79 ft). It is displayed in the museum's Dinosaurs of Sichuan and Chongqing gallery.

Other prominent specimens include the Longchang iron meteorite, a 158.5 kg (349 lb) meteorite historically recorded in Longchang, Sichuan, and the fossil known as the Dazhu Chongqing fish (Chungkingichthys tachuensis), a well-preserved Jurassic fish specimen.

== See also ==
- Chengdu University of Technology
- Chengdu Museum
- Zigong Dinosaur Museum
- List of museums in China
