= Yanzhuang, Henan =

Yanzhuang 闫庄镇
- Town
- Location in Henan
- Coordinates: 34°14′18″N 112°06′21″E
- Country: People's Republic of China
- Province: Henan
- Prefecture-level city: Luoyang
- County: Song
- Elevation: 370 m (1,210 ft)
- Time zone: UTC+8 (China Standard)

Yanzhuang (simplified Chinese: 闫庄; traditional Chinese: 閆莊; pinyin: Yánzhuāng) is a town of Song County in the Qin Mountains of western Henan province, China, located about 12 kilometres (7.5 mi) north of the county seat. As of 2011, it has 21 villages under its administration.

== See also ==
- List of township-level divisions of Henan
