= Qingyang, Chengdu =

Qingyang 青羊区
- District
- District of Qingyang, City of Chengdu
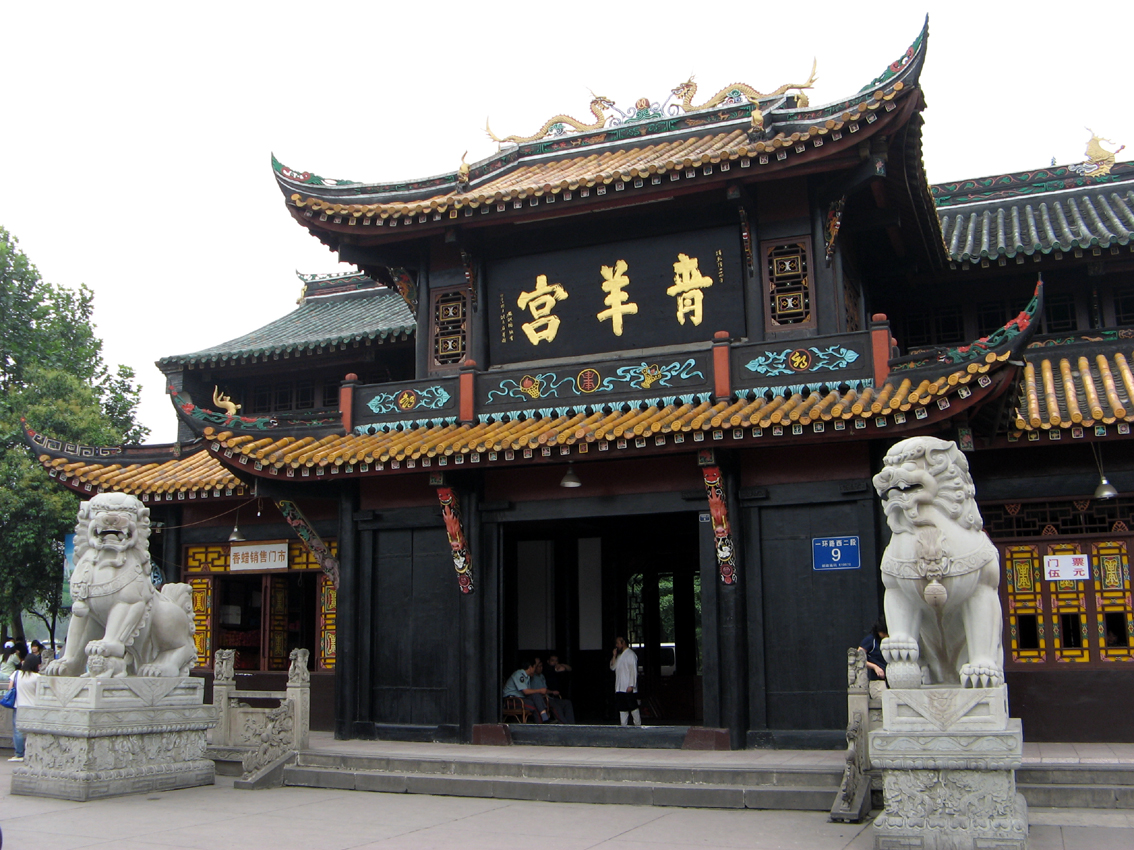
- Qingyang Palace

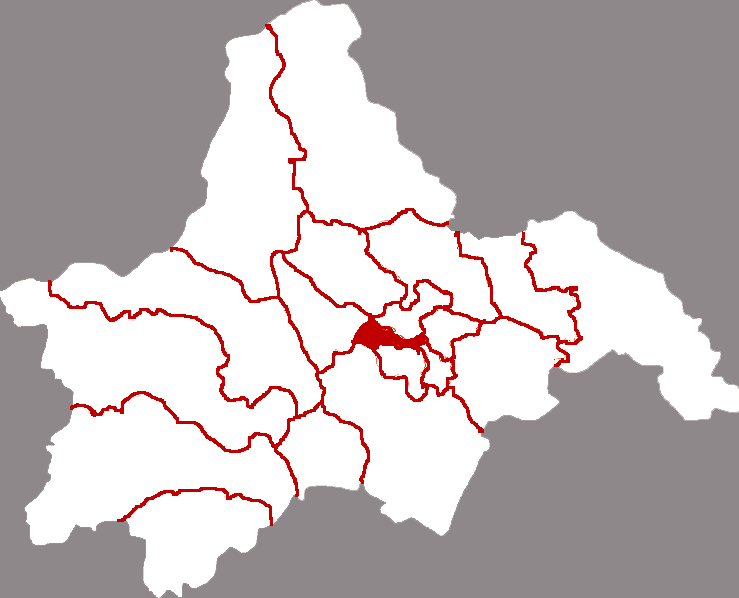
- Location of Qingyang in Chengdu

- Location in Sichuan
- Coordinates: 30°41′07″N 103°59′34″E
- Country: China
- Province: Sichuan
- Sub-provincial city: Chengdu
- District seat: Caoshijie Subdistrict

Area
  - Total: 67.78 km^{2} (26.17 sq mi)

Population (2020 census)
  - Total: 955,954
  - Density: 14,100/km^{2} (36,530/sq mi)
- Time zone: UTC+8 (China Standard)
- Website: www.cdqingyang.gov.cn

Qingyang District (Chinese: 青羊区; pinyin: Qīngyáng Qū) is a central urban district of the City of Chengdu, capital of Sichuan, China.

Qingyang District is bordered by Jinniu District to the northeast, Jinjiang District to the southeast, Wuhou District to the south, Shuangliu District to the southwest, Wenjiang District to the west, and Pidu District to the north. Qingyang has an area of 68 square kilometers and a population of 460,000.

== Administrative divisions ==
Qingyang District administers 12 subdistricts:

- Caoshijie Subdistrict (草市街街道)
- Xiyuhe Subdistrict (西御河街道)
- Shaocheng Subdistrict (少城街道)
- Caotang Subdistrict (草堂街道)
- Funan Subdistrict (府南街道)
- Guanghua Subdistrict (光华街道)
- Jinsha Subdistrict (金沙街道)
- Huangtianba Subdistrict (黄田坝街道)
- Supo Subdistrict (苏坡街道)
- Wenjia Subdistrict (文家街道)
- Caiqiao Subdistrict (蔡桥街道)
- Kanghe Subdistrict (康河街道)

== Tourist attractions ==
The following are in the Qingyang District:

- Chengdu Huangcheng Mosque
- Chengdu Museum
- Du Fu Thatched Cottage
- Jincheng Art Palace
- Jinsha site
- People's Park
- Qingyang Temple
- Sichuan Art Museum
- Sichuan Provincial Library
- Sichuan Science and Technology Museum
- Wenshu Temple
