= Tianhu Subdistrict =

Tianhu Subdistrict 天湖街道
- Subdistrict
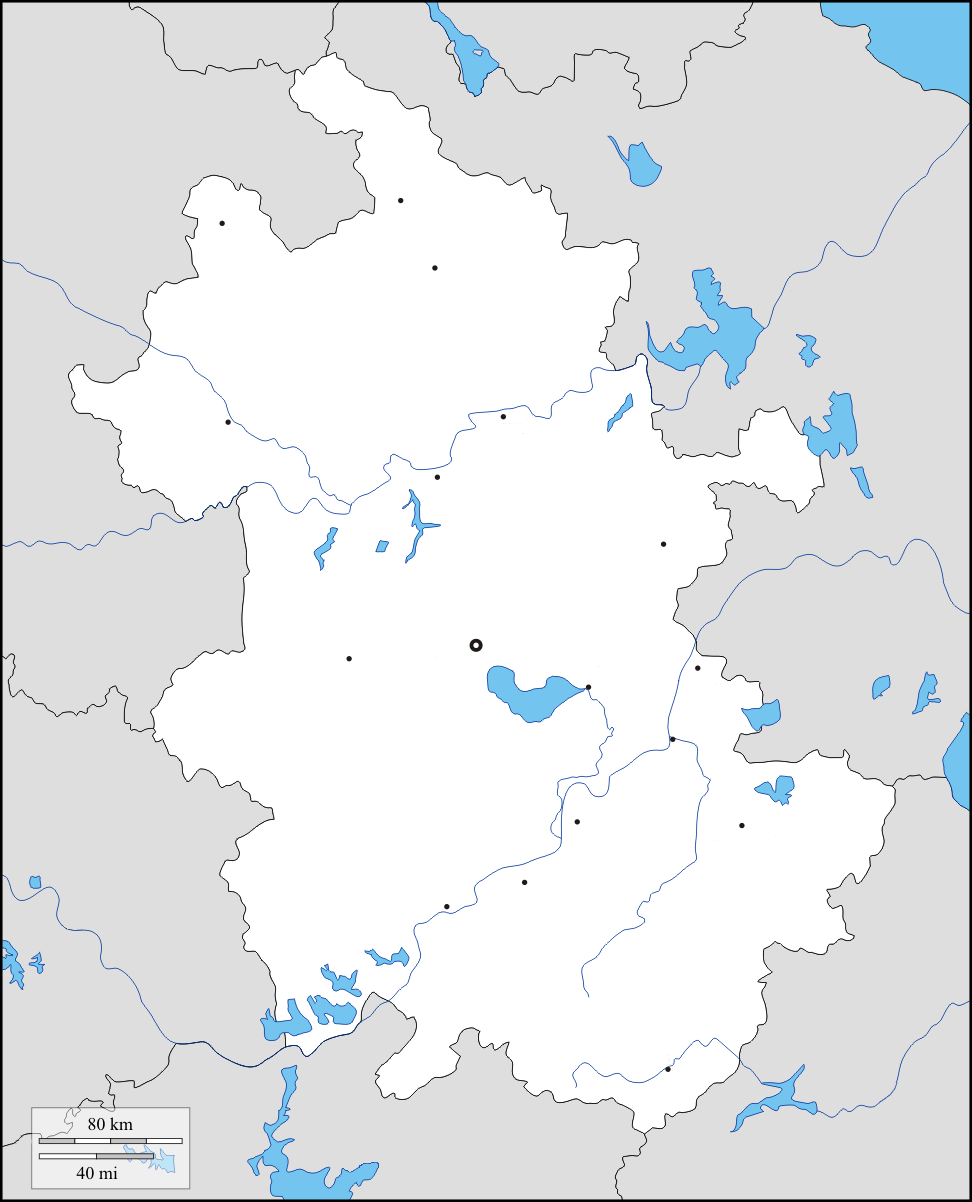
- Location in Anhui
- Coordinates: 30°55′19″N 118°35′13″E
- Country: People's Republic of China
- Province: Anhui
- Prefecture-level city: Xuancheng
- County-level city: Ningguo
- Time zone: UTC+8 (China Standard)

Tianhu Subdistrict (Chinese: 天湖街道; pinyin: Tiānhú Jiēdào) is a subdistrict in Ningguo, Xuancheng, Anhui, China under the administration of Xuancheng Economic Development Area (宣城市经济开发区). As of 2023, it administers Tianhu Residential Community, Ma Village (马村), Qian Village (钱村), Tang Village (汤村), and Fenghe Village (枫河村).

== See also ==
- List of township-level divisions of Anhui
