= Wuyi Square (Fuzhou) =

Square in Fuzhou, Fujian, China

Coordinates: 26.079072°N 119.303373°E

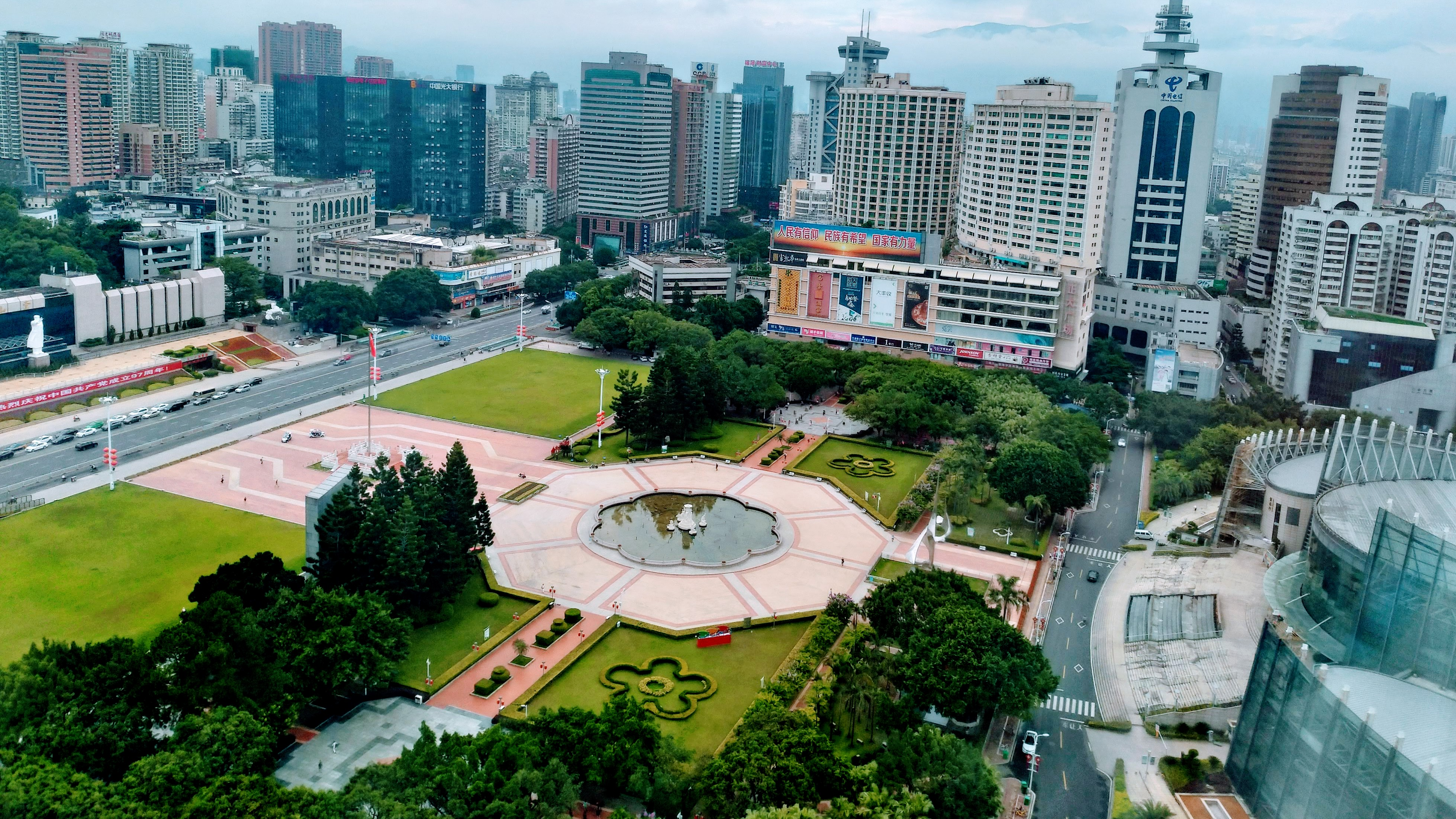
Wuyi Square from above

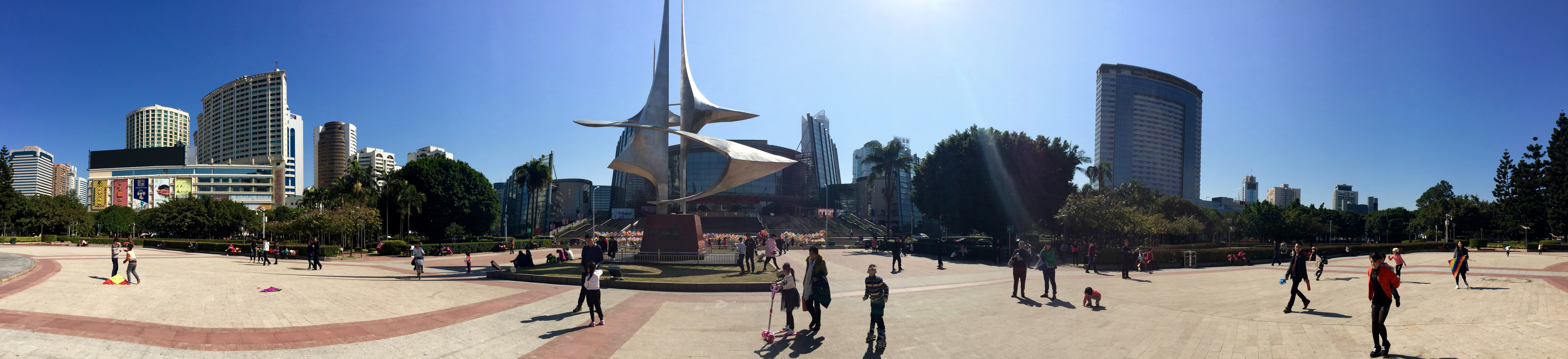
Panoramic view looking south

Wuyi Square (Chinese: 五一广场) is located in Gulou District, Fuzhou, Fujian, China. North of the square is the Nine Immortals' Hill (Yu Hill).

The square covers an area of 70,000 square meters. This one of the political activities place for Fuzhou people.

The Statue of Mao Zedong is located in the square.
