= Sichuan Provincial Library =

Provincial public library in Chengdu, Sichuan, China

- 四川省图书馆
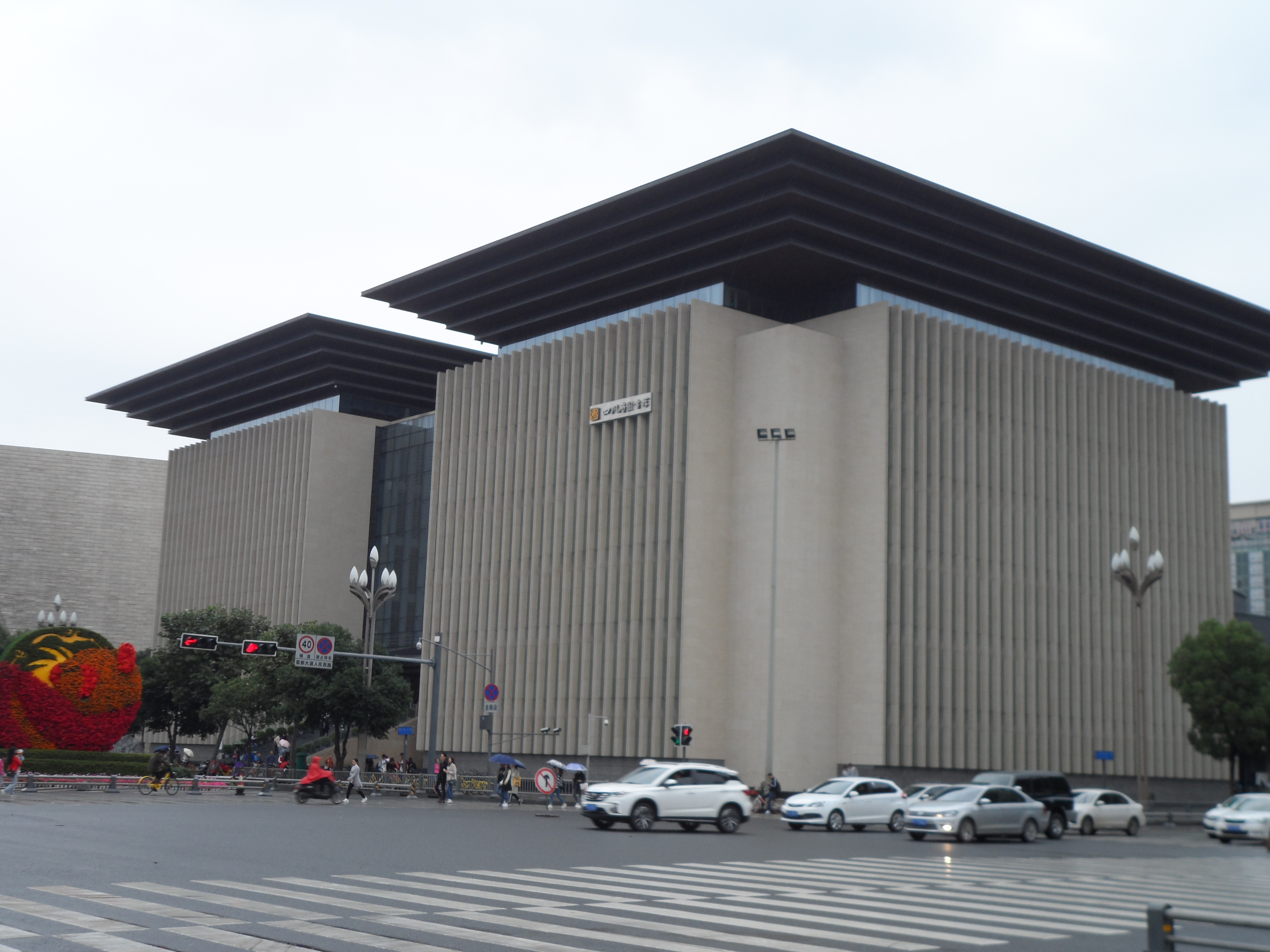
- Location: 4 Renmin West Road, Qingyang, Chengdu, Sichuan, China
- Type: Public library
- Established: 1912

Other information
- Website: www.sclib.org

Sichuan Provincial Library is the provincial public library of Sichuan, China, located in Qingyang, Chengdu. It is the largest library in Western China and one of the ten largest libraries in the country. The library was officially established in October 1912 and is the second oldest public library in China. The library is adjacent to Tianfu Square, the geographic center of Chengdu City.

== History ==
Sichuan Provincial Library was planned in 1909. On 20 October 1912, it was officially established and open to the public in a small blue brick building west of Chengdu Shaocheng Park (now People's Park).

In August 1927, due to financial difficulties of the Sichuan provincial government, Deng Xihou (commander of the 28th Army of the National Revolutionary Army in Chengdu) ordered the Sichuan Provincial Library to be transferred to the Chengdu Municipal Governmental Office for management. The library was renamed "Chengdu Municipal Library" by the city government in October 1928.

In November 1929, the Sichuan Provincial Department of Education sent a letter to the Chengdu Municipal Government, proposing to take over the Chengdu Municipal Library from the city government. The Chengdu Municipal Government replied and rejected this request.

In 1936, the Sichuan Provincial Department of Education prepared to rebuild the Provincial Library. It hired 15 people, including Gu Jiegang, Jiang Fucong, and Shen Zurong, as standing members of the Provincial Library Preparatory Committee. On 10 April 1940, Sichuan Provincial Library was re-established. The library was located in the former Qing Chengshou Yamen on Chengdu Chengshou Street.

The library was renamed Western Sichuan Library in 1950, Western Sichuan People's Library in 1951, and Sichuan Provincial Library in 1952. The final name has been in use ever since.

In June 2019, Sichuan Provincial Library established the Zhang Daqian Documentation Centre.

On 11 October 2020, the Long Scroll of 100 Pictures of Giant Pandas Thangka debuted at the Sichuan Provincial Library.

== See also ==
- List of libraries in China
