= Statue of Mao Zedong, Fuzhou =

Statue in Fujian, China

Statue of Mao Zedong
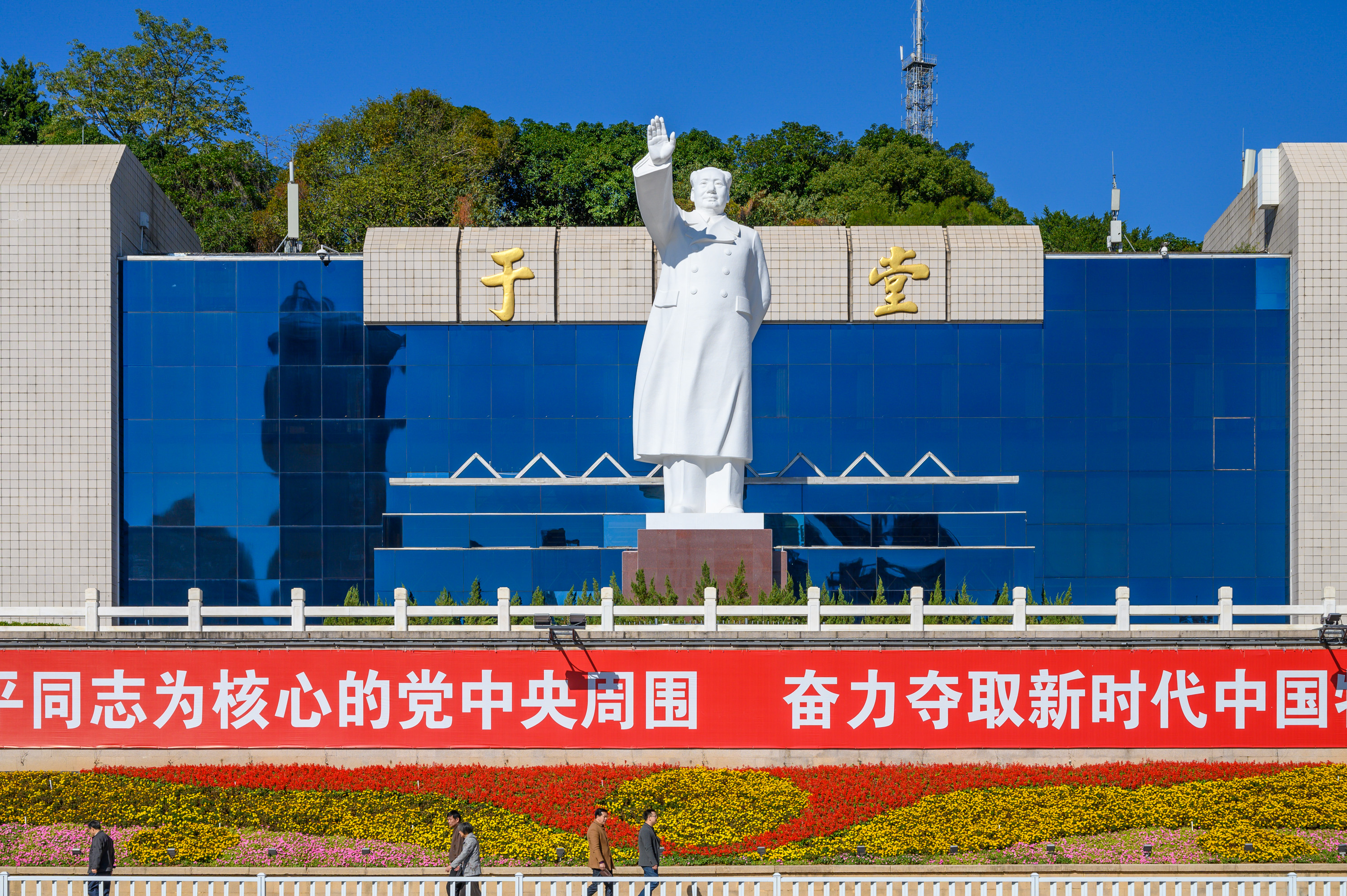
- Statue on Wuyi Square, Fuzhou

- Artist: Yang Zhengrong
- Year: 1969
- Subject: Mao Zedong
- Dimensions: 10.1 m (33 ft)
- Location: Wuyi Square, Fuzhou
- 26°04′46.7″N 119°18′12.1″E

The Mao Zedong Statue is located in Wuyi Square, Fuzhou, Fujian, China. The monument stands 10.1 m (33.1365 ft) tall and depicts Mao Zedong with an outstretched arm. The statue was built by Yang Zhengrong, a painter in Fujian, beginning in 1969; it was completed after a year and a half.
