= Long Live the Victory of Mao Zedong Thought =

Monument in Shenyang, Liaoning, China

- 毛泽东思想胜利万岁
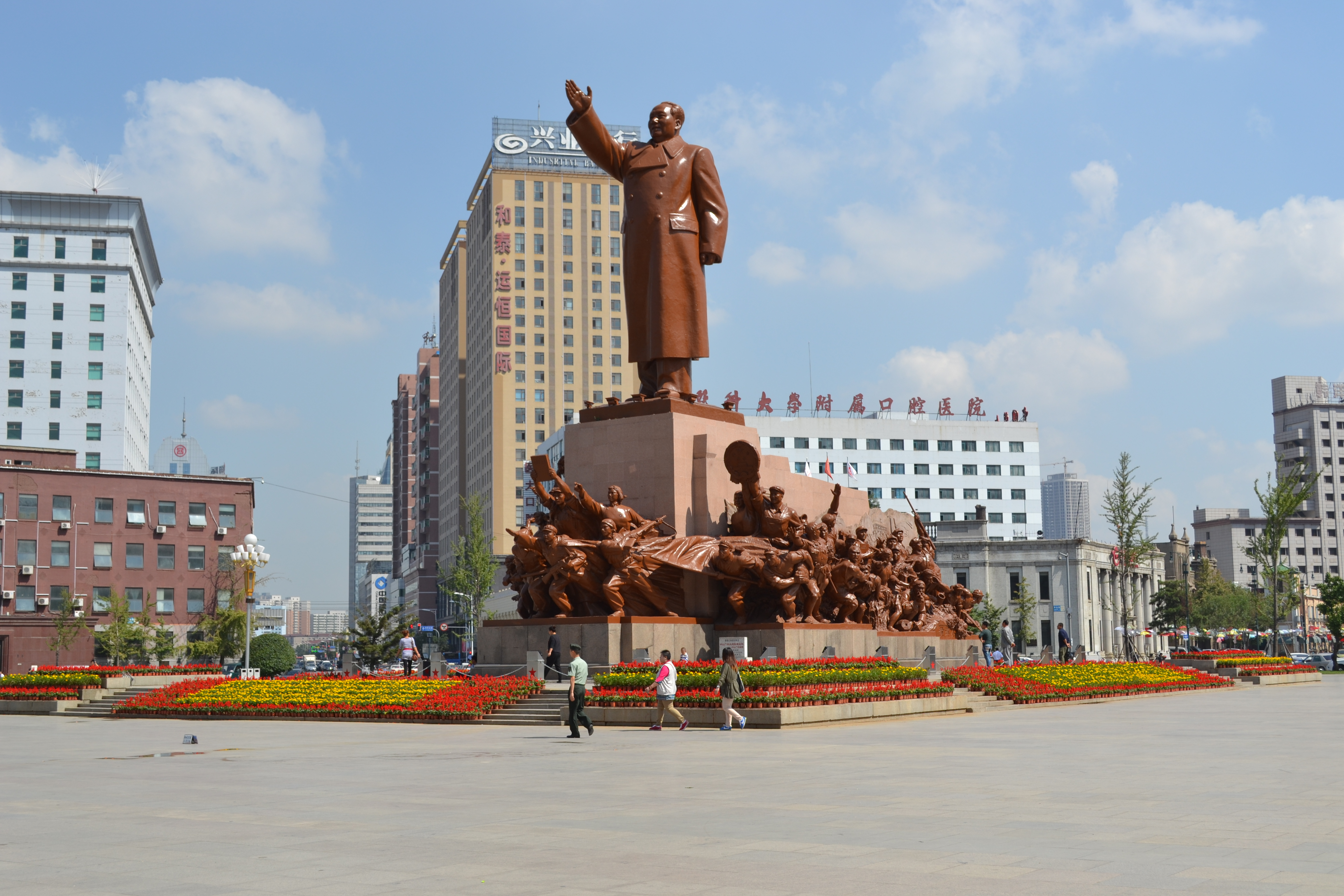
- The Long Live the Victory of Mao Zedong Thought monument in Shenyang
- Interactive map of Long Live the Victory of Mao Zedong Thought
- Location: Zhongshan Square, Shenyang, China
- Coordinates: 41°47′48.6″N 123°24′37.6″E
- Designer: students from the Art Academy
- Type: Statue
- Material: Epoxy
- Height: 9 metres (30 ft)
- Completion date: October 1, 1970
- Dedicated to: Mao Zedong

Long Live the Victory of Mao Zedong Thought (Chinese: 毛泽东思想胜利万岁) is an epoxy resin statue in Shenyang, Liaoning, China. The monument is located on Zhongshan Square in the center of the city. The statue is one of the largest of Chairman Mao Zedong in the country. It is one of the main provincial Cultural Revolution-era monuments not removed in later years.

== Statue ==
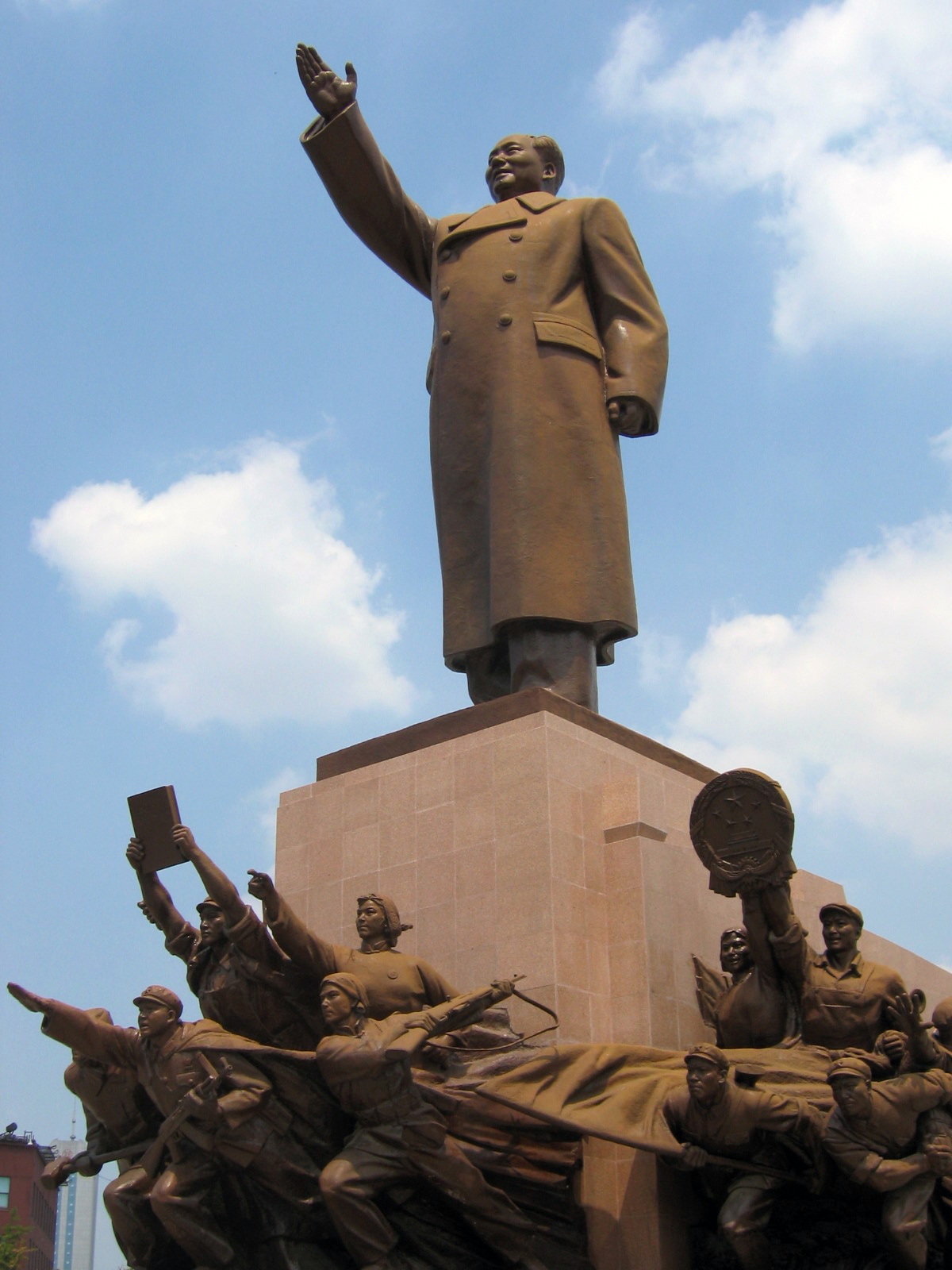
Close up view of the monument

The monument was erected by students from the Art Academy, who worked for two years on the project. They were supervised by a committee of peasants and workers. It was inaugurated on October 1, 1970, during the 21st anniversary celebrations of the founding of the People's Republic of China. The statue of Chairman Mao is 9 metres (30 ft) tall, and the base another 9 metres (30 ft) tall. The phrase "Long Live the Victory of Mao Zedong Thought" was carved on the front of the base.

Its base is surrounded by statues of 58 'worker-peasant-soldier heroes'. They are divided into eight groups, representing different struggles of the Chinese people under the leadership of Chairman Mao. Most of the surrounding characters originally carried Little Red Books, but most of these have been removed. The first group represents soldiers and civilians, propagating the appeal of the 9th National Congress of the Chinese Communist Party ("Unite to win still greater victories"). The group of statues at back of the base is titled "Party Building", and seeks to display the early phase of the Communist Party. The three groups on the left ("A Single Spark Can Start a Prairie Fire", "Long Live the People's War" and "Carry the Revolution to the End") illustrate struggles during the Chinese Civil War. The remaining three groups ("Socialism is Good", "Long Live the Three Red Banners" and "Carry the Great Proletarian Cultural Revolution Through to the End") on the right side of the base illustrate the phase of socialist revolution.
