= Tianhe Road station =

Metro station in Chengdu, China

Tianhe Road 天河路
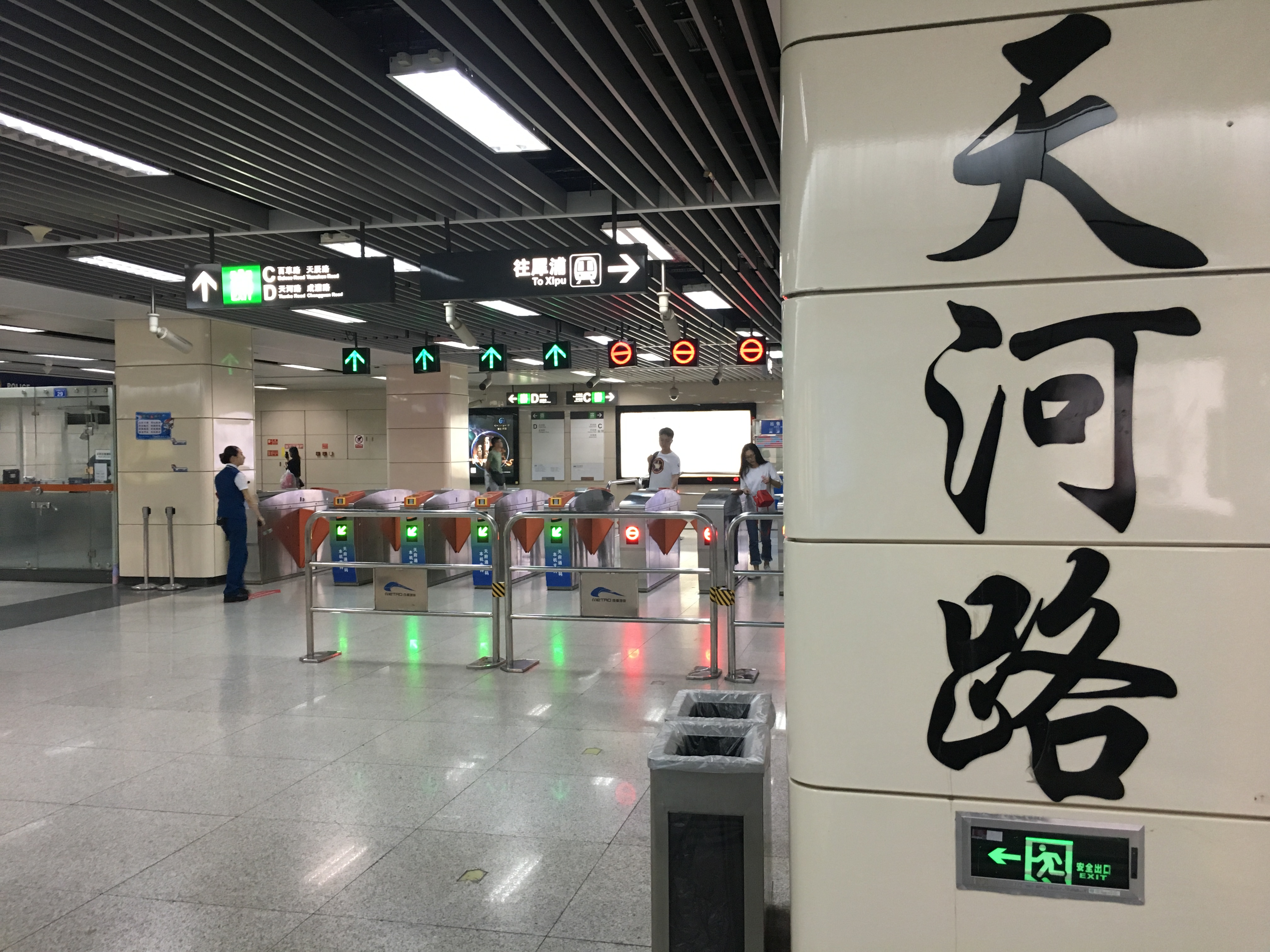

General information
- Location: Pidu District, Chengdu, Sichuan; China
- Coordinates: 30.7482199°N 103.9737620°E
- Operated by: Chengdu Metro Limited
- Line: Line 2
- Platforms: 2 (2 side platforms)

Other information
- Station code: 0231

History
- Opened: 8 June 2013

Services
Preceding station	Chengdu Metro	Following station
Baicao Road towards Longquanyi	Line 2	Xipu Railway Station Terminus
Location

Tianhe Road (Chinese: 天河路) is a station on Line 2 of the Chengdu Metro in China. The station is also served by Chengdu Tram Line T2.

== Station layout ==
G	Ground level	Exits A-D
B1	Concourse	Faregates, Station Agent
B1	Side platform, doors open on the left
B1	Eastbound	Line 2 towards Longquanyi (Baicao Road) →
B1	Westbound	← Line 2 towards Xipu Railway Station (Terminus)
B1	Side platform, doors open on the left
B1	Concourse	Faregates, Station Agent
