= Lianshanpo station =

Metro station in Chengdu, China

Lianshanpo 连山坡

General information
- Location: Longquanyi District, Chengdu, Sichuan; China
- Coordinates: 30.5901384°N 104.2104766°E
- Operator: Chengdu Metro Limited
- Line: Line 2
- Platforms: 2 (2 island platforms)

Other information
- Station code: 0205

History
- Opened: 26 October 2014

Services
Preceding station	Chengdu Metro	Following station
Jiepai towards Longquanyi	Line 2	Damianpu towards Xipu Railway Station
Location

Lianshanpo (Chinese: 连山坡) is a station on Line 2 of the Chengdu Metro in China.

== Station layout ==
3F	Side platform, doors open on the right
3F	Westbound	← Line 2 towards Xipu (Damianpu)
3F	Eastbound	Line 2 towards Longquanyi (Jiepai) →
3F	Side platform, doors open on the right
2F	Concourse	Faregates, Station Agent
G	Entrances and Exits	Exits A-B
