= Chengdu Academy of Governance station =

Metro station in Chengdu, China

Chengdu Academy of Governance 成都行政学院
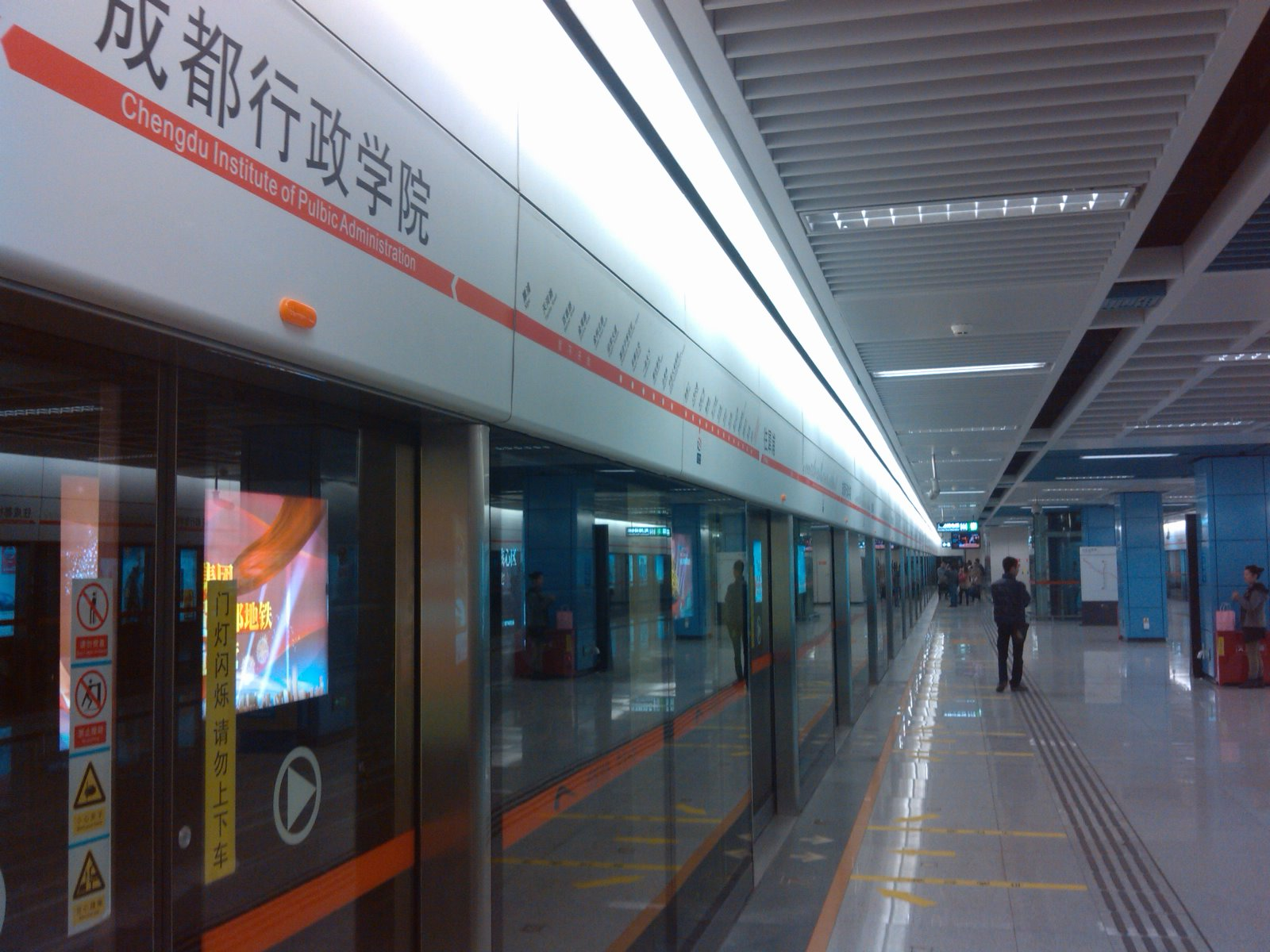

General information
- Location: Longquanyi District, Chengdu, Sichuan; China
- Coordinates: 30.59962°N 104.16824°E
- Operator: Chengdu Metro Limited
- Line: Line 2
- Platforms: 2 (1 island platform)

Other information
- Station code: 0208

History
- Opened: 16 September 2012

Services
| Preceding station | Chengdu Metro | Following station |
|---|---|---|
| Longquanyi Railway Station towards Longquanyi | Line 2 | Honghe towards Xipu Railway Station |
Location

Chengdu Academy of Governance (Chinese: 成都行政学院), formerly Chengdu Institute of Public Administration, is a station on Line 2 of the Chengdu Metro in China. It previously served as the eastern terminus for Line 2 until 2014.

It was the eastern terminus of Line 2 from December 2025 until September 2026 due to the new construction of Longquanyi Railway Station which the section between Damianpu-Longquanyi was suspended due to track alignment works, and to facilitate the upcoming Longquanyi Railway Station.

== Station layout ==
| G | Entrances and Exits | Exits A-B, Faregates, Station Agent |
| B1 | Westbound | ← Line 2 towards Xipu Railway Station (Honghe) |
| B1 | Island platform, doors open on the left |
| B1 | Eastbound | Line 2 towards Longquanyi (Longquanyi Railway Station) → |
