= Yingbin Avenue station =

Metro station in Chengdu, China

Yingbin Avenue 迎宾大道

General information
- Location: Jinniu District, Chengdu, Sichuan; China
- Coordinates: 30.7159527°N 104.0110017°E
- Operated by: Chengdu Metro Limited
- Line: Line 2
- Platforms: 2 (1 island platform)

Other information
- Station code: 0227

History
- Opened: 8 June 2013

Services
Preceding station	Chengdu Metro	Following station
Chadianzi Bus Terminal Station towards Longquanyi	Line 2	Jinke North Road towards Xipu Railway Station
Location

Yingbin Avenue (Chinese: 迎宾大道) is a station on Line 2 of the Chengdu Metro in China.

== Station layout ==
G	Entrances and Exits	Exits A-D
B1	Concourse	Faregates, Station Agent
B2	Westbound	← Line 2 towards Xipu Railway Station (Jinke North Road)
B2	Island platform, doors open on the left
B2	Eastbound	Line 2 towards Longquanyi (Chadianzi Bus Terminal Station) →
