= Damianpu station =

Metro station in Chengdu, China

Damianpu 大面铺
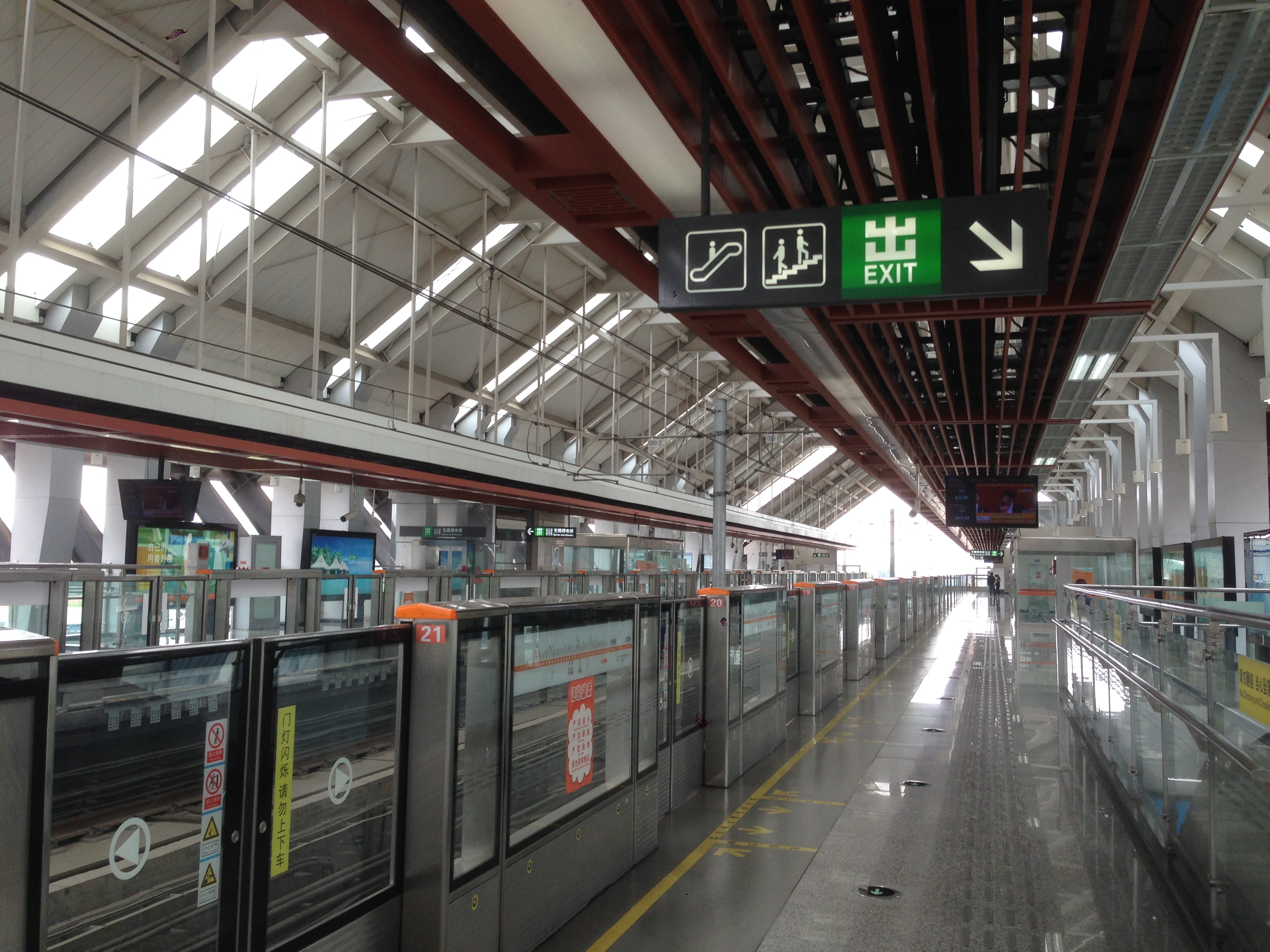

General information
- Location: Longquanyi District, Chengdu, Sichuan; China
- Coordinates: 30.59492°N 104.19905°E
- Operator: Chengdu Metro Limited
- Line: Line 2
- Platforms: 2 (2 island platforms)

Other information
- Station code: 0206

History
- Opened: 26 October 2014

Services
Preceding station	Chengdu Metro	Following station
Lianshanpo towards Longquanyi	Line 2	Longquanyi Railway Station towards Xipu Railway Station
Location

Damianpu (Chinese: 大面铺) is a station on Line 2 of the Chengdu Metro in China.

== Station layout ==
3F	Side platform, doors open on the right
3F	Westbound	← Line 2 towards Xipu (Longquanyi Railway Station)
3F	Eastbound	Line 2 towards Longquanyi (Lianshanpo) →
3F	Side platform, doors open on the right
2F	Concourse	Faregates, Station Agent
G	Entrances and Exits	Exits A-B
