= Chadianzi Bus Terminal station =

Metro station in Chengdu, China

Chadianzi Bus Terminal Station 茶店子客运站
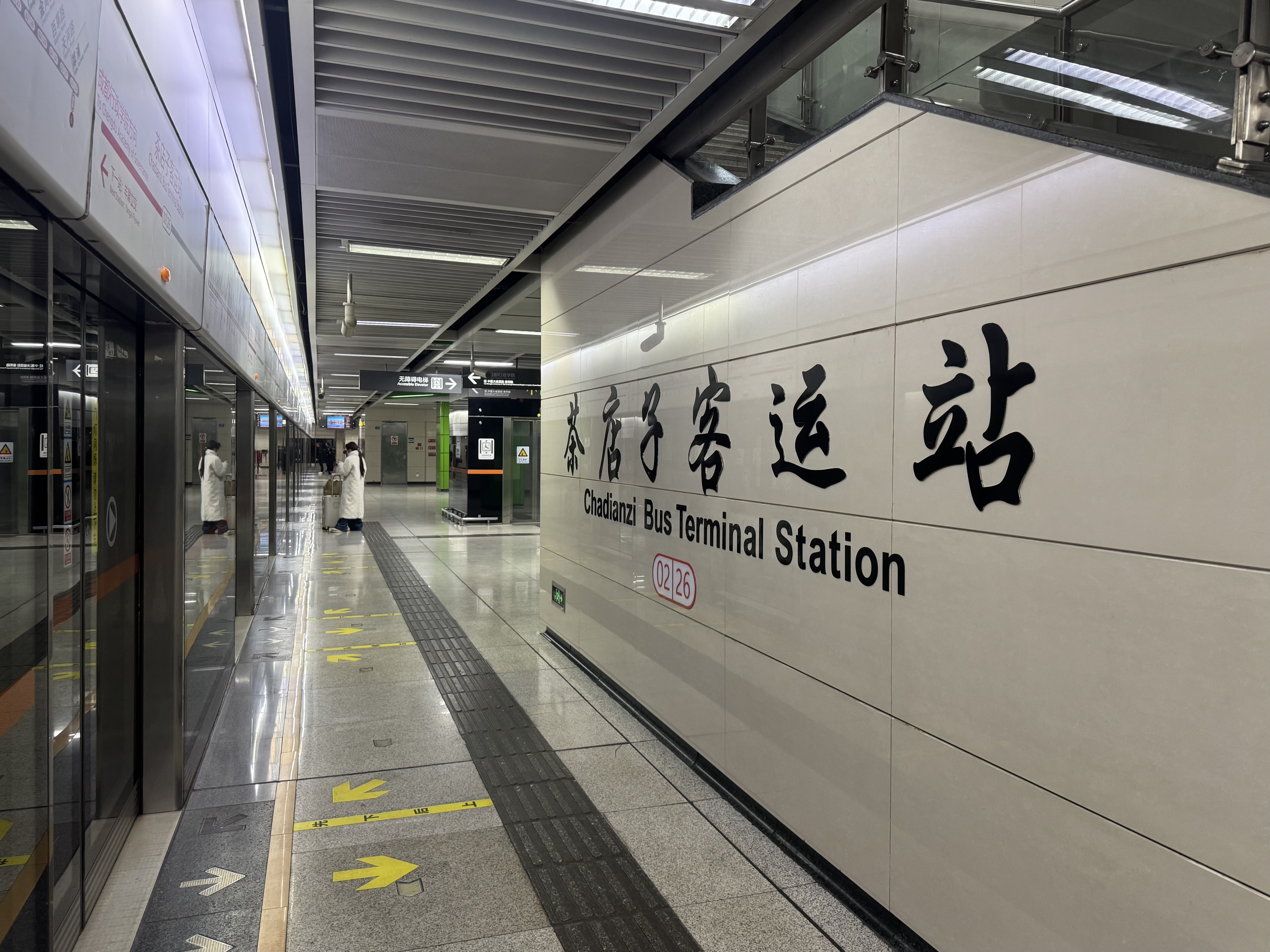

General information
- Location: Jinniu District, Chengdu, Sichuan; China
- Coordinates: 30.71°N 104.01°E
- Operated by: Chengdu Metro Limited
- Line: Line 2
- Platforms: 2 (1 island platform)

Other information
- Station code: 0226

History
- Opened: 16 September 2012
- Previous names: Chadianzi Bus Terminal

Services
Preceding station	Chengdu Metro	Following station
Yangxi Flyover towards Longquanyi	Line 2	Yingbin Avenue towards Xipu Railway Station
Location

Chadianzi Bus Terminal Station or Chadianzi Bus Terminal station (Chinese: 茶店子客运站; pinyin: Chádiànzǐ Kèyùn Zhàn) is a metro station on Line 2 of the Chengdu Metro in China.

== Station layout ==
G	Entrances and Exits	Exits A, C, D, H, J
B1	Concourse	Faregates, Station Agent
B2	Westbound	← Line 2 towards Xipu (Yingbin Avenue)
B2	Island platform, doors open on the left
B2	Eastbound	Line 2 towards Longquanyi (Yangxi Flyover) →
