= Jinzhou Road station =

Metro station in Chengdu, China

Jinzhou Road 金周路

General information
- Location: Jinniu District, Chengdu, Sichuan; China
- Coordinates: 30.7241362°N 103.9937837°E
- Operated by: Chengdu Metro Limited
- Line: Line 2
- Platforms: 2 (1 island platform)

Other information
- Station code: 0229

History
- Opened: 8 June 2013

Services
| Preceding station | Chengdu Metro | Following station |
|---|---|---|
| Jinke North Road towards Longquanyi | Line 2 | Baicao Road towards Xipu Railway Station |
Location

Jinzhou Road (Chinese: 金周路) is a station on Line 2 of the Chengdu Metro in China.

== Station layout ==
| G | Entrances and Exits | Exits B-D |
| B1 | Concourse | Faregates, Station Agent |
| B2 | Westbound | ← Line 2 towards Xipu (Baicao Road) |
| B2 | Island platform, doors open on the left |
| B2 | Eastbound | Line 2 towards Longquanyi (Jinke Road North) → |
