= Huiwangling station =

Metro station in Chengdu, China

Huiwangling 惠王陵
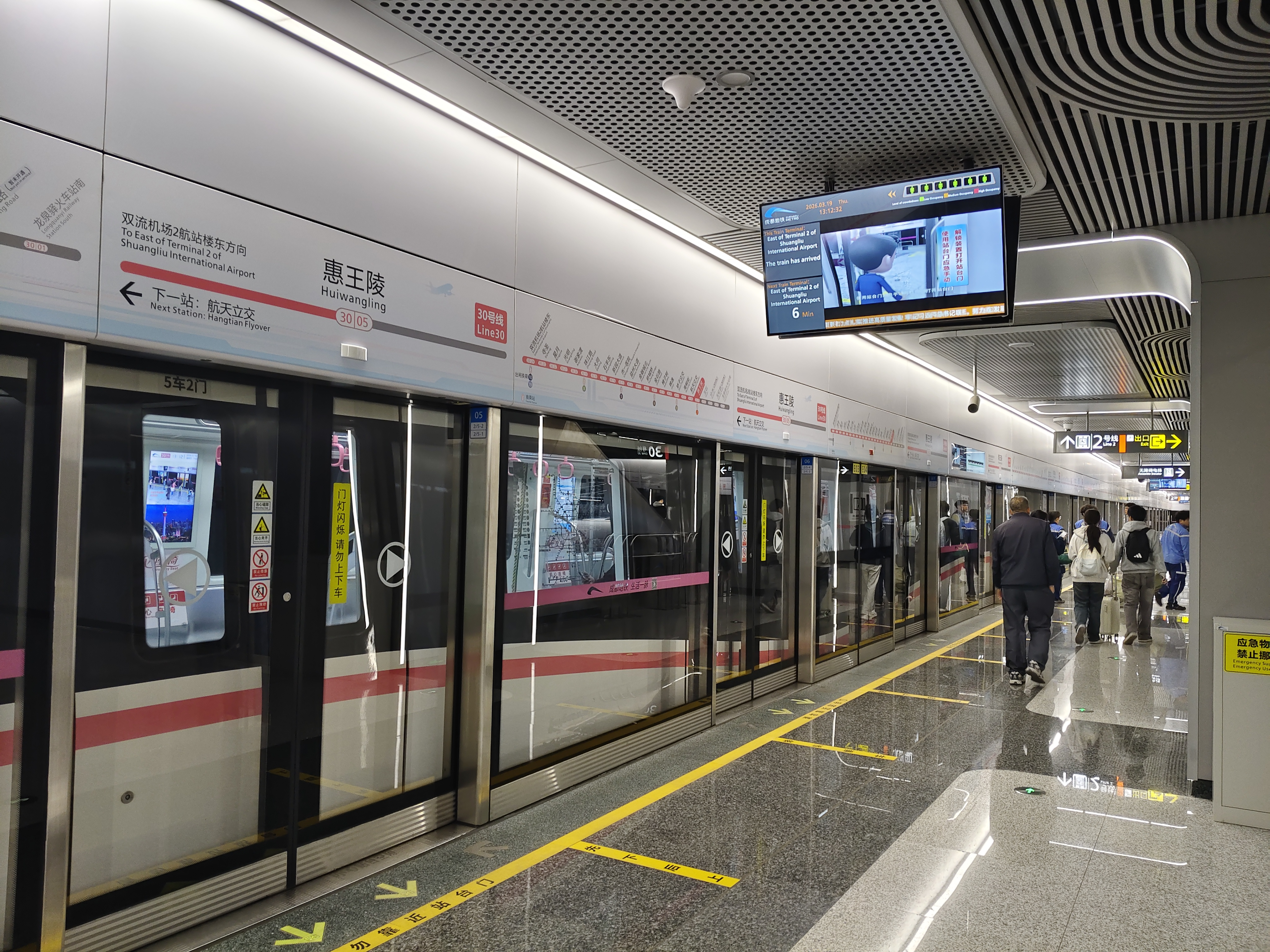
- Line 30 platform

General information
- Location: Longquanyi District, Chengdu, Sichuan; China
- Coordinates: 30.6144314°N 104.1495961°E
- Operated by: Chengdu Metro Limited
- Lines: Line 2 Line 30
- Platforms: 4 (2 island platforms)

Other information
- Station code: 0209; 3005

History
- Opened: 16 September 2012 (Line 2); 16 December 2025 (Line 30)

Services
| Preceding station | Chengdu Metro | Following station |
|---|---|---|
| Honghe towards Longquanyi | Line 2 | Chengyu Flyover towards Xipu Railway Station |
| Yushi towards Longquanyi Railway Station South | Line 30 | Hangtian Flyover towards East of Terminal 2 of Shuangliu International Airport |
Location

Huiwangling (Chinese: 惠王陵) is a station on Line 2 and Line 30 of the Chengdu Metro in China.

== Station layout ==
| G | Entrances and Exits | Exits A, C, D, E, H |
| B1 | Concourse | Faregates, Station Agent |
| B2 | Westbound | ← Line 2 towards Xipu (Chengyu Flyover) |
| B2 | Island platform, doors open on the left |
| B2 | Eastbound | Line 2 towards Longquanyi (Honghe) → |
