= Chengyu Flyover station =

Metro station in Chengdu, China

Chengyu Flyover 成渝立交
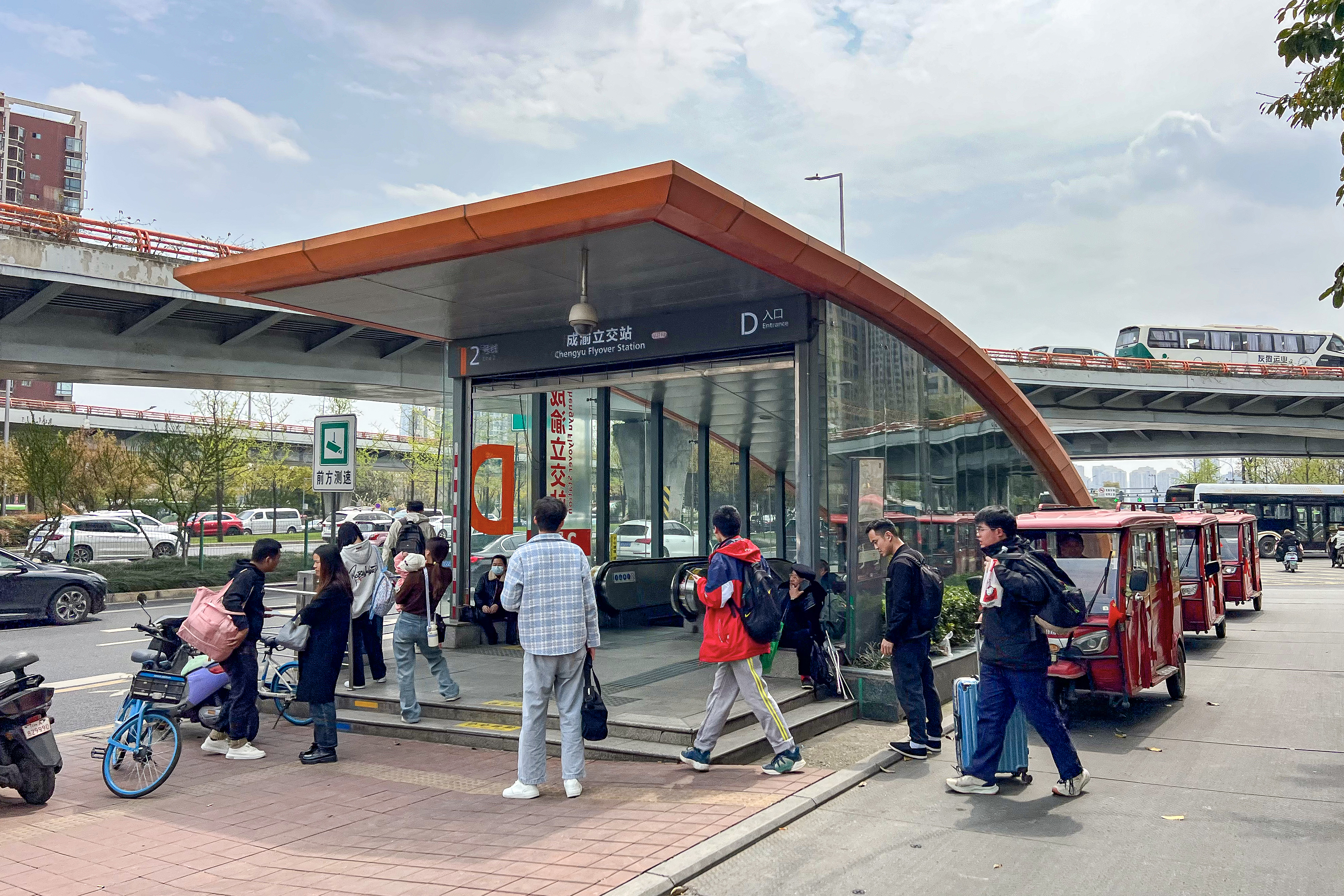
- Exit D

General information
- Location: Chenghua District, Chengdu, Sichuan; China
- Coordinates: 30.62731°N 104.14467°E
- Operated by: Chengdu Metro Limited
- Line(s): Line 2
- Platforms: 2 (1 island platform)

Other information
- Station code: 0210

History
- Opened: 16 September 2012

Services
Preceding station	Chengdu Metro	Following station
Huiwangling towards Longquanyi	Line 2	Chengdu East Railway Station towards Xipu Railway Station

Chengyu Flyover (Chinese: 成渝立交) is a station on Line 2 of the Chengdu Metro in China.

== Station layout ==
G	Entrances and Exits	Exits A-D
B1	Concourse	Faregates, Station Agent
B2	Westbound	← Line 2 towards Xipu Railway Station (Chengdu East Railway Station)
B2	Island platform, doors open on the left
B2	Eastbound	Line 2 towards Longquanyi (Huiwangling) →
