= Yangxi Flyover station =

Metro station in Chengdu, China

Yangxi Flyover 羊犀立交
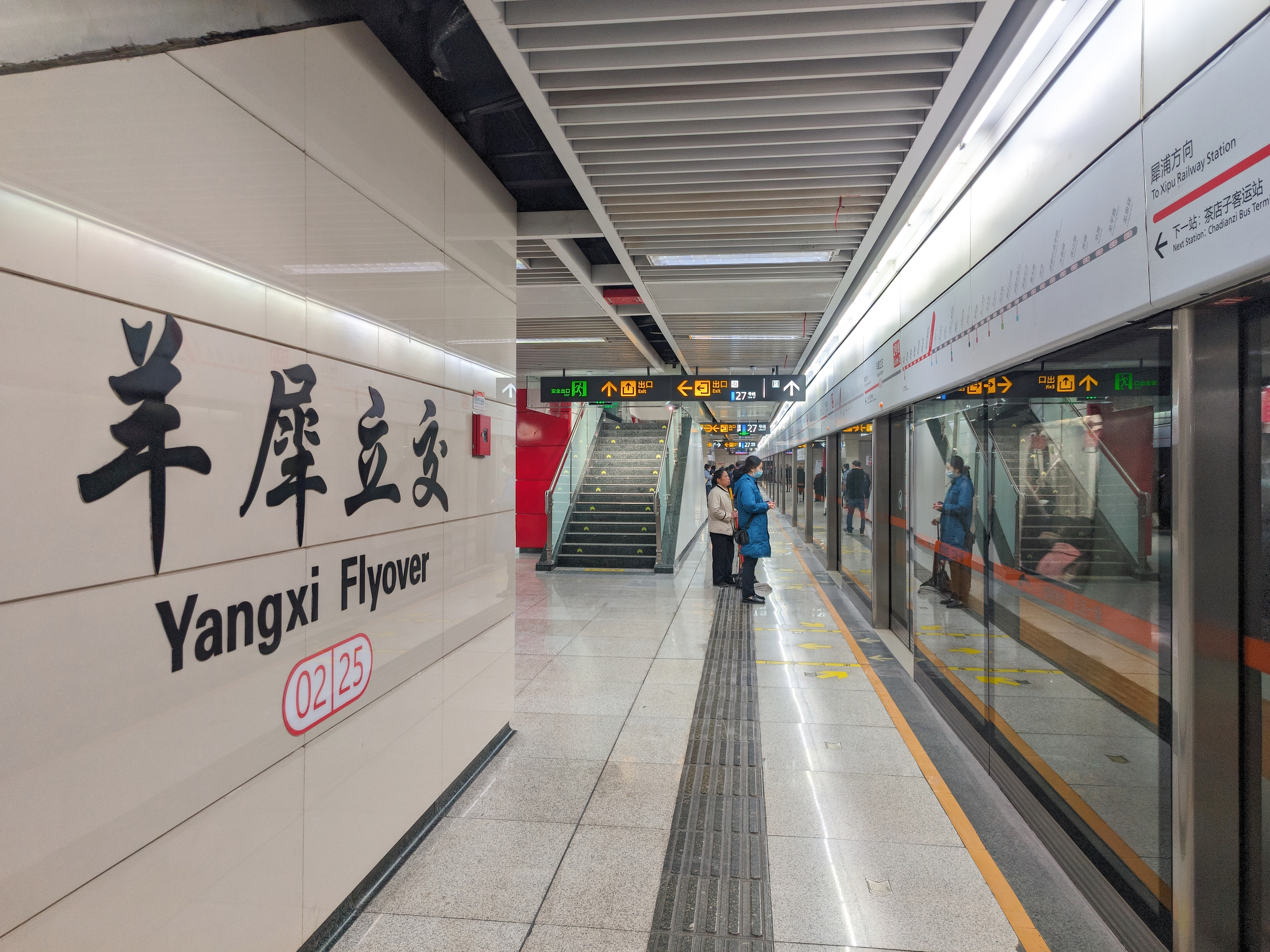
- Line 2 platform

General information
- Location: Jinniu District, Chengdu, Sichuan; China
- Coordinates: 30.6967230°N 104.0100809°E
- Operated by: Chengdu Metro Limited
- Lines: Line 2 Line 27
- Platforms: 4 (2 island platforms)

Other information
- Station code: 0225 2720

History
- Opened: 16 September 2012 (Line 2); 19 December 2024 (Line 27)

Services
Preceding station	Chengdu Metro	Following station
Yipintianxia towards Longquanyi	Line 2	Chadianzi Bus Terminal Station towards Xipu Railway Station
Jinniu Park towards Shifo	Line 27	Huangzhong towards Shuxin Road
Location

Yangxi Flyover (Chinese: 羊犀立交) is a station of Line 2 and Line 27 of the Chengdu Metro in China.

== Station layout ==
G	Ground level	Exits
B1	Concourse	Faregates, Station Agent
B2	Westbound	← Line 2 towards Xipu Railway Station (Chadianzi Bus Terminal Station)
B2	Island platform, doors open on the left
B2	Eastbound	Line 2 towards Longquanyi (Yipintianxia) →
B3	Northbound	← Line 27 towards Shifo (Jinniu Park)
B3	Island platform, doors open on the left
B3	Southbound	Line 27 towards Shuxin Road (Huangzhong) →

== Gallery ==
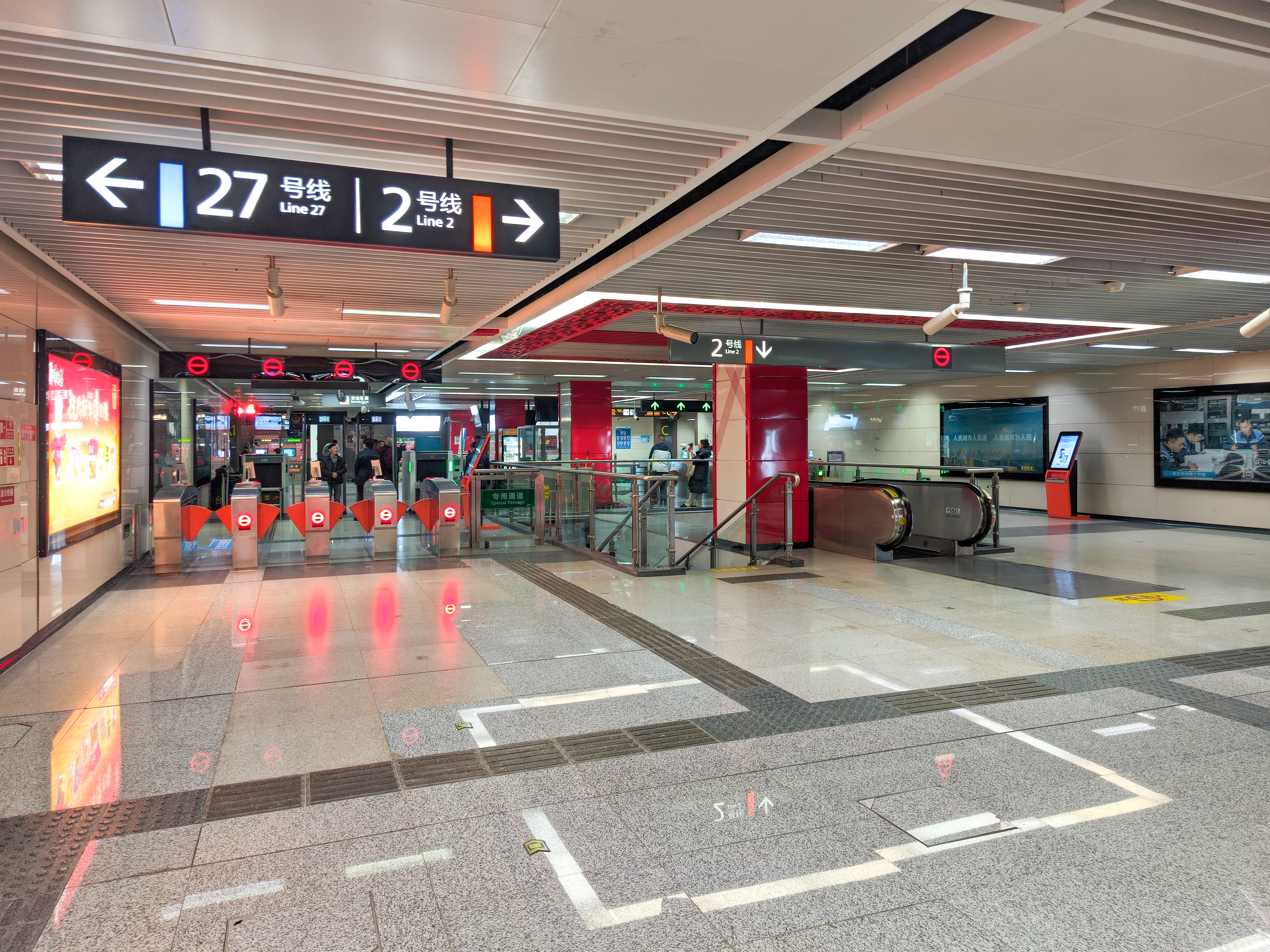
Concourse of Line 2

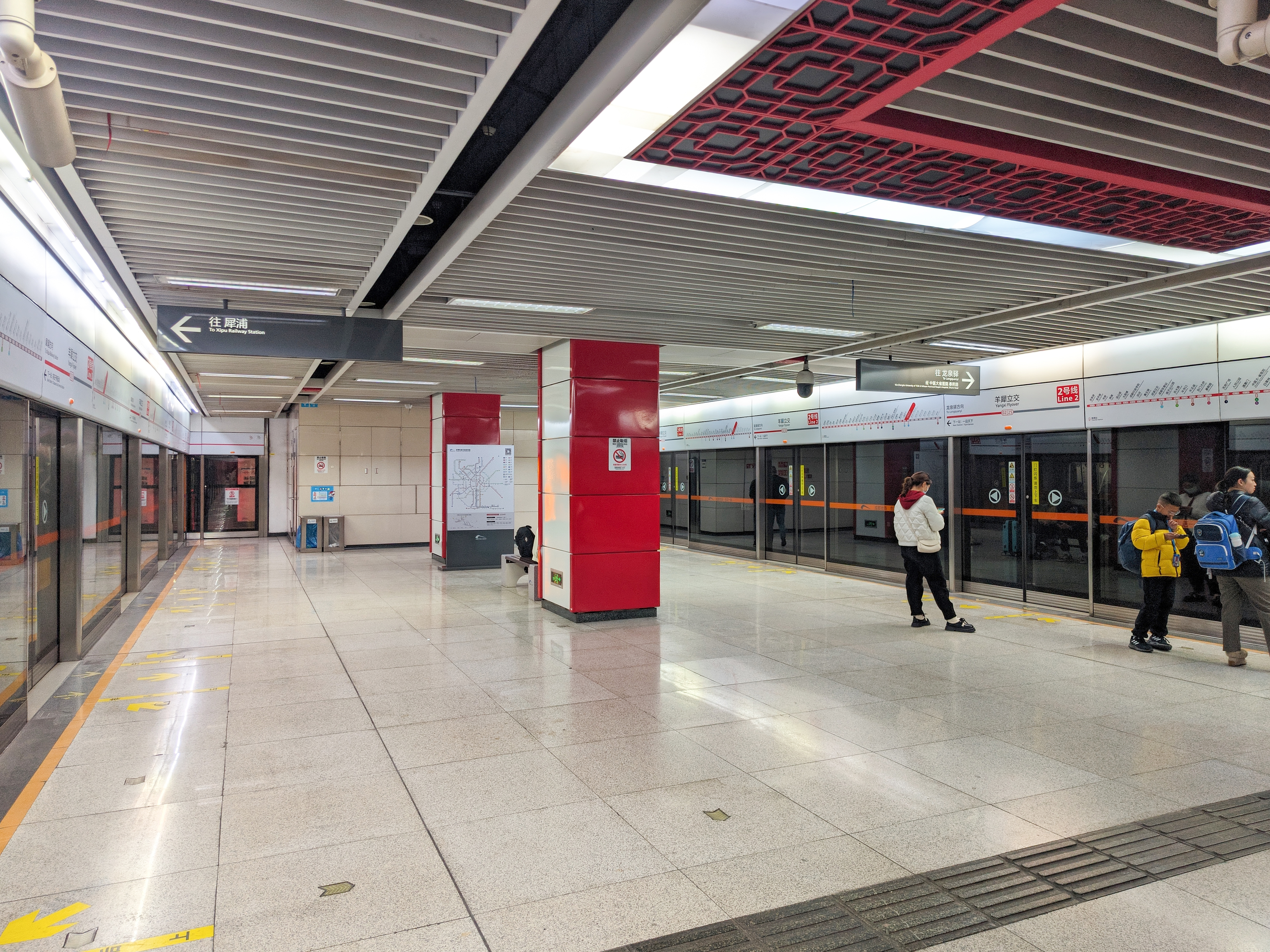
Platform of Line 2

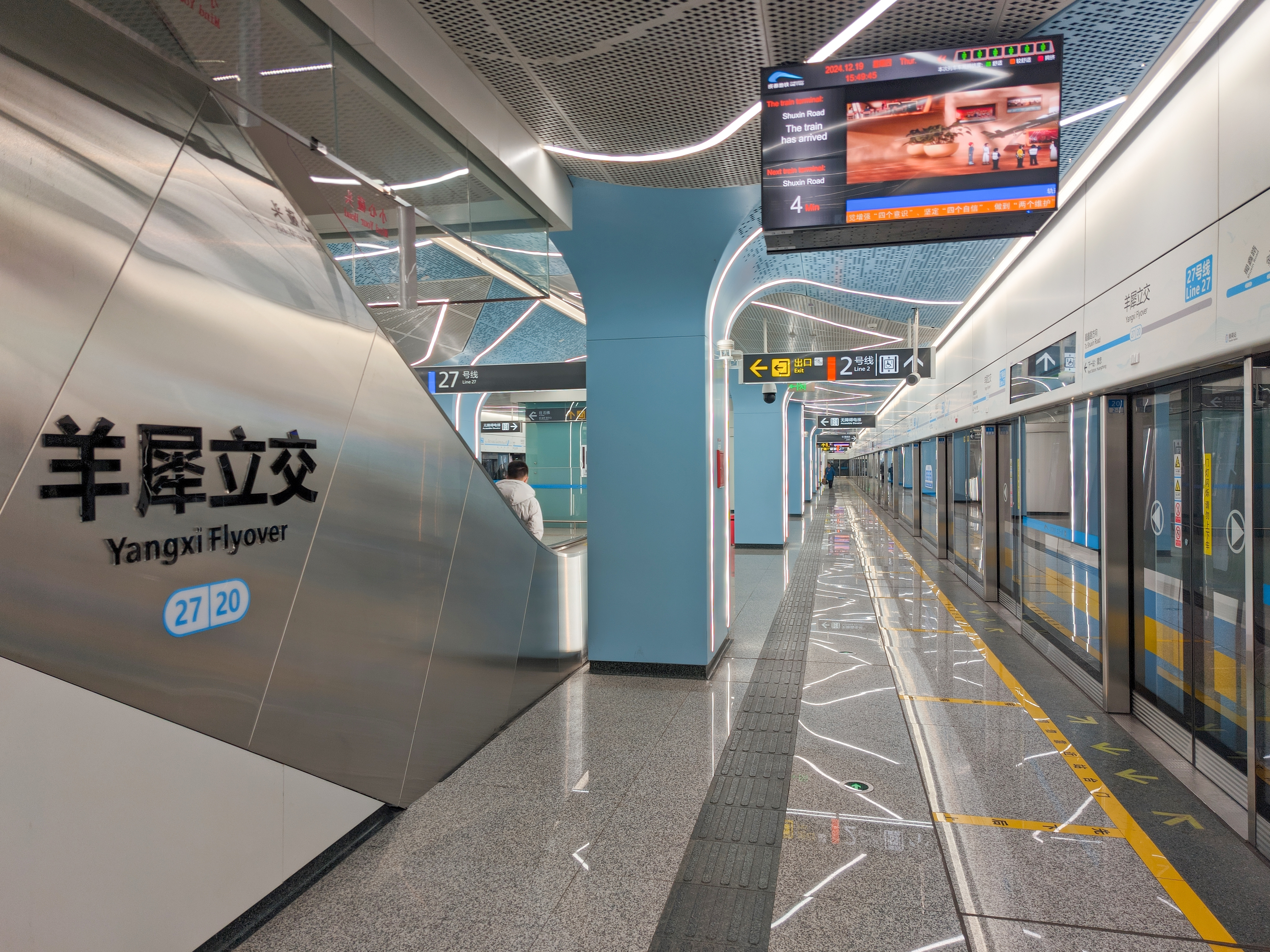
Platform of Line 27

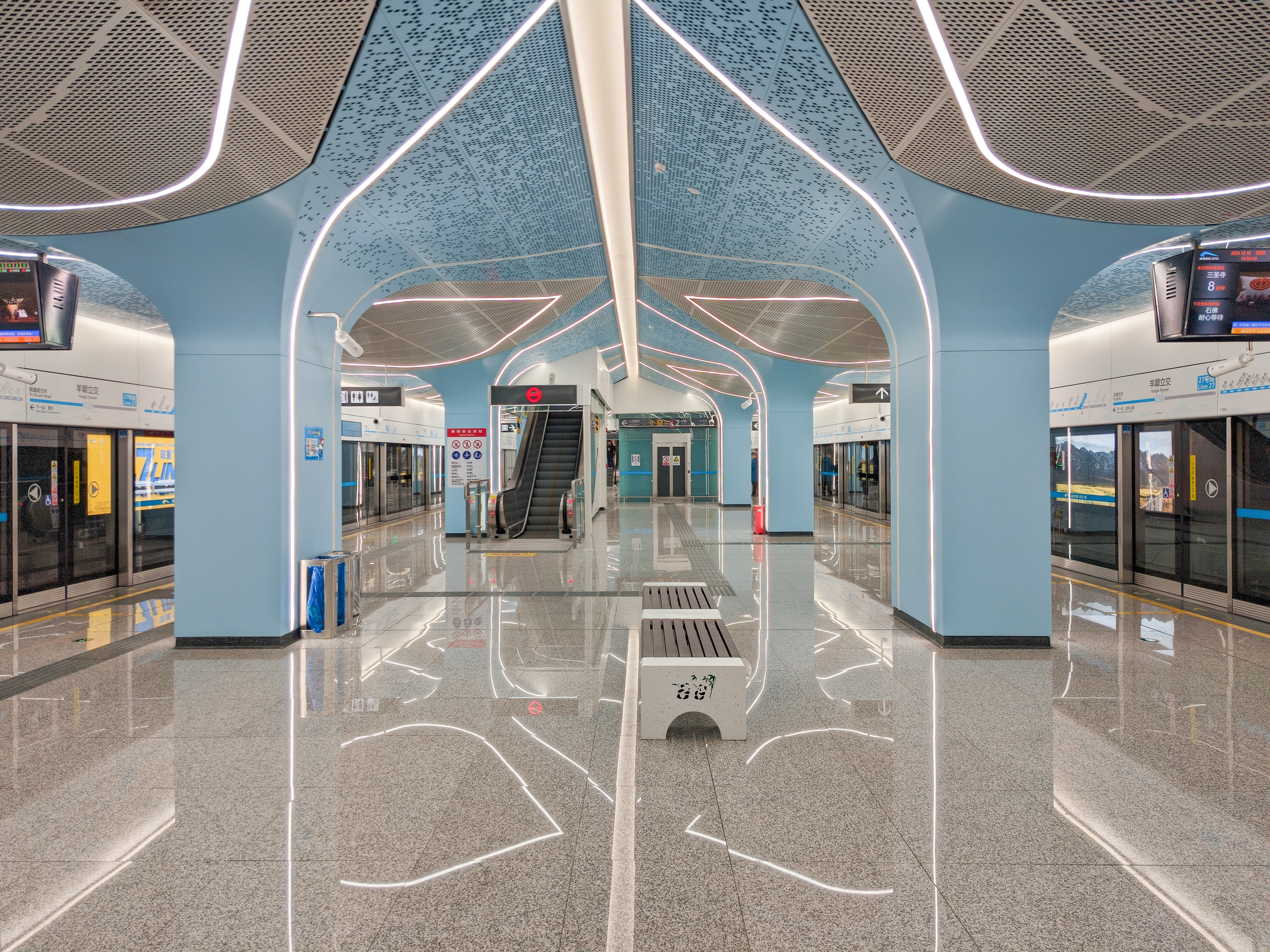
Platform of Line 27

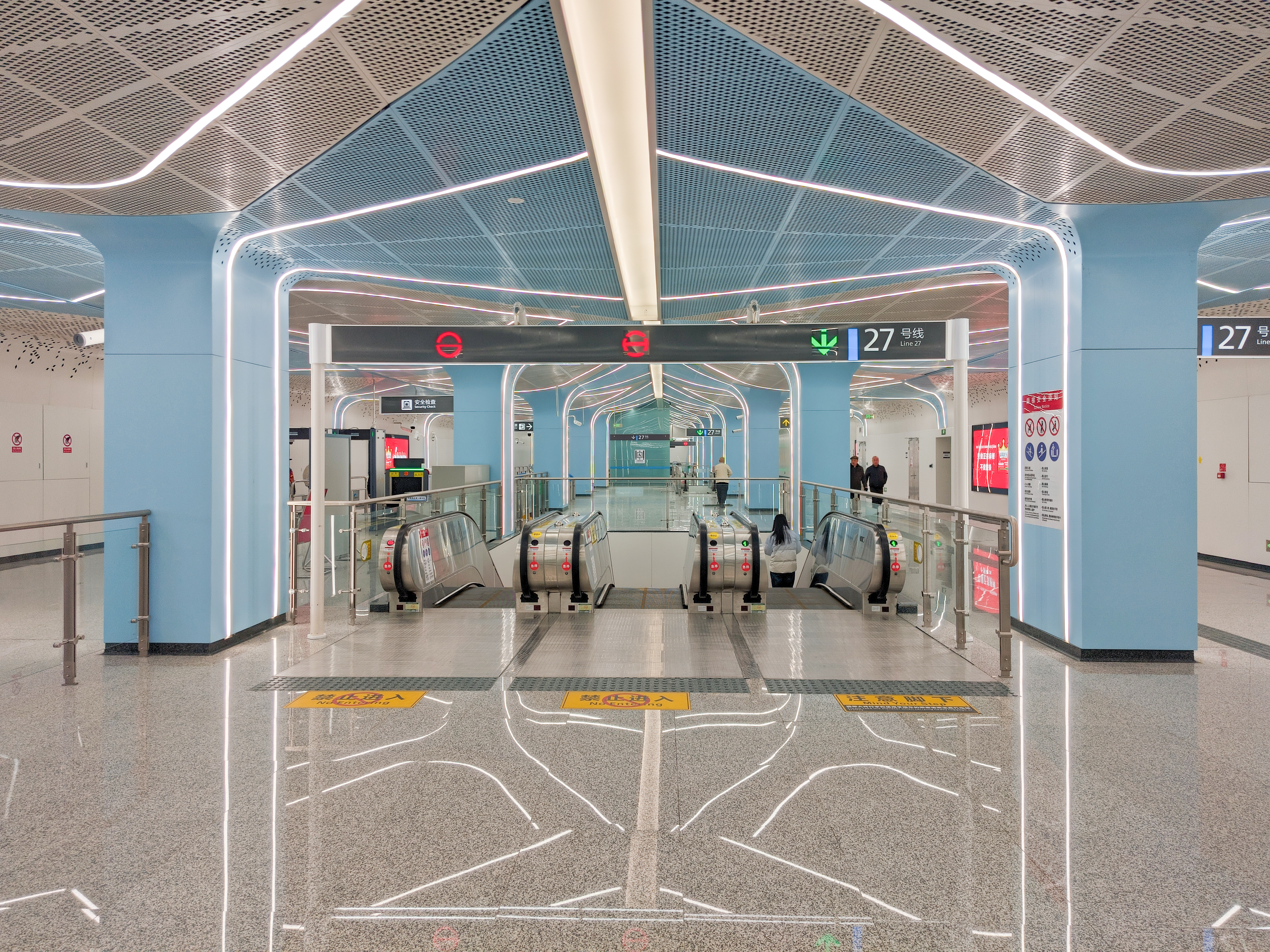
Concourse of Line 27
