= Jinke North Road station =

Metro station in Chengdu, China

Coordinates: 30.7232°N 104.0042°E

Jinke North Road 金科北路

General information
- Location: Jinniu District, Chengdu, Sichuan; China
- Operator: Chengdu Metro Limited
- Line: Line 2
- Platforms: 2 (1 island platform)

Other information
- Station code: 0228

History
- Opened: 8 June 2013
- Former names: Jinke Road North

Services
Preceding station	Chengdu Metro	Following station
Yingbin Avenue towards Longquanyi	Line 2	Jinzhou Road towards Xipu Railway Station
Location

Jinke North Road (Chinese: 金科北路), formerly known as Jinke Road North, is a station on Line 2 of the Chengdu Metro in China.

== Station layout ==
G	Entrances and Exits	Exits A-D
B1	Concourse	Faregates, Station Agent
B2	Westbound	← Line 2 towards Xipu (Jinzhou Road)
B2	Island platform, doors open on the left
B2	Eastbound	Line 2 towards Longquanyi (Yingbin Avenue) →
