= Niushikou station =

Metro station in Chengdu, China

Niushikou 牛市口
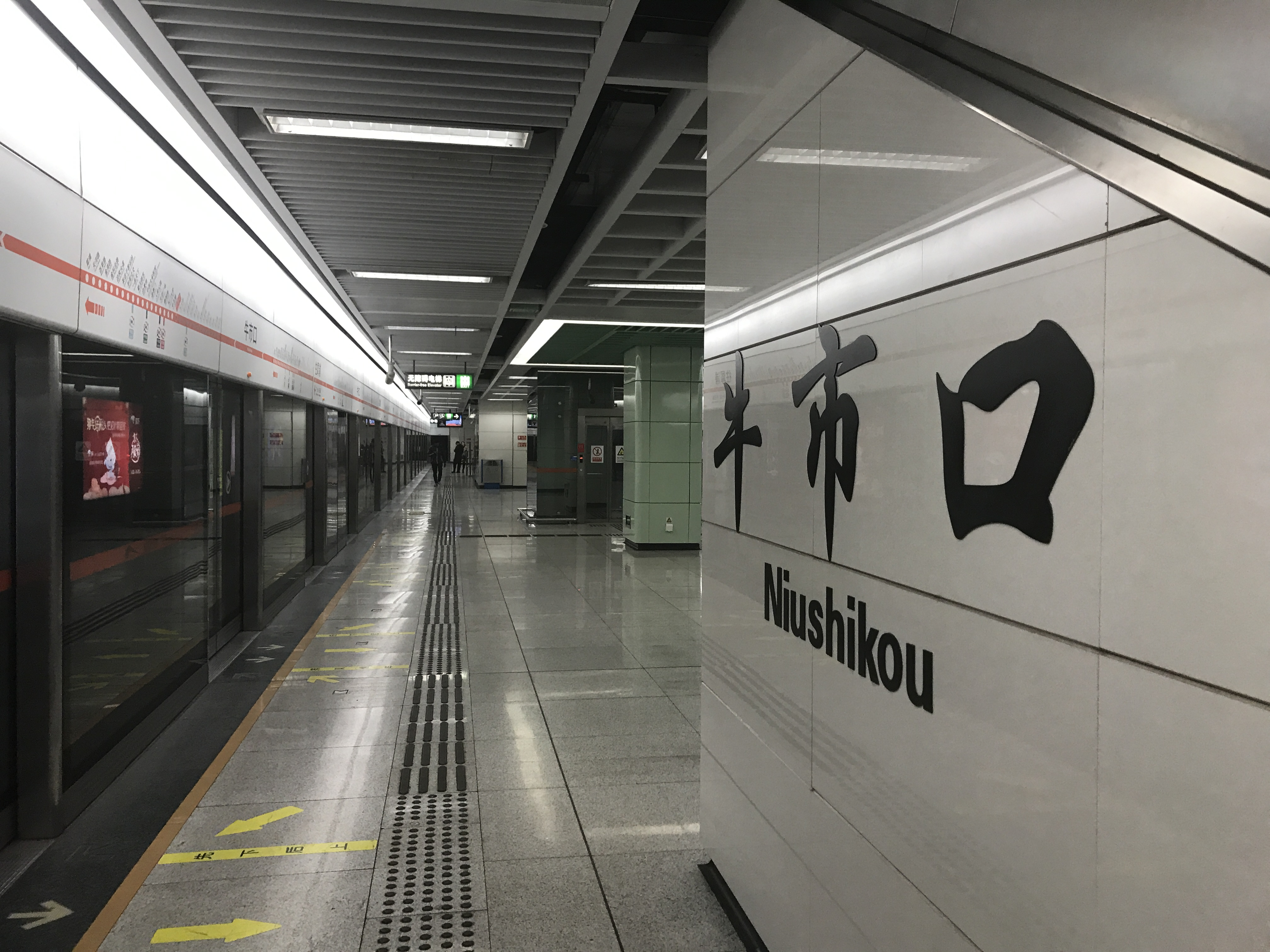

General information
- Location: Jinjiang District, Chengdu, Sichuan; China
- Coordinates: 30.6400907°N 104.1052060°E
- Operated by: Chengdu Metro Limited
- Line: Line 2
- Platforms: 2 (1 island platform)

Other information
- Station code: 0214

History
- Opened: 16 September 2012

Services
Preceding station	Chengdu Metro	Following station
Dongdalu Road towards Longquanyi	Line 2	Niuwangmiao towards Xipu Railway Station
Location

Niushikou (Chinese: 牛市口) is a station on Line 2 of the Chengdu Metro in China.

== Station layout ==
G	Entrances and Exits	Exits A-C
B1	Concourse	Faregates, Station Agent
B2	Westbound	← Line 2 towards Xipu Railway Station (Niuwangmiao)
B2	Island platform, doors open on the left
B2	Eastbound	Line 2 towards Longquanyi (Dongdalu Road) →

== Gallery ==
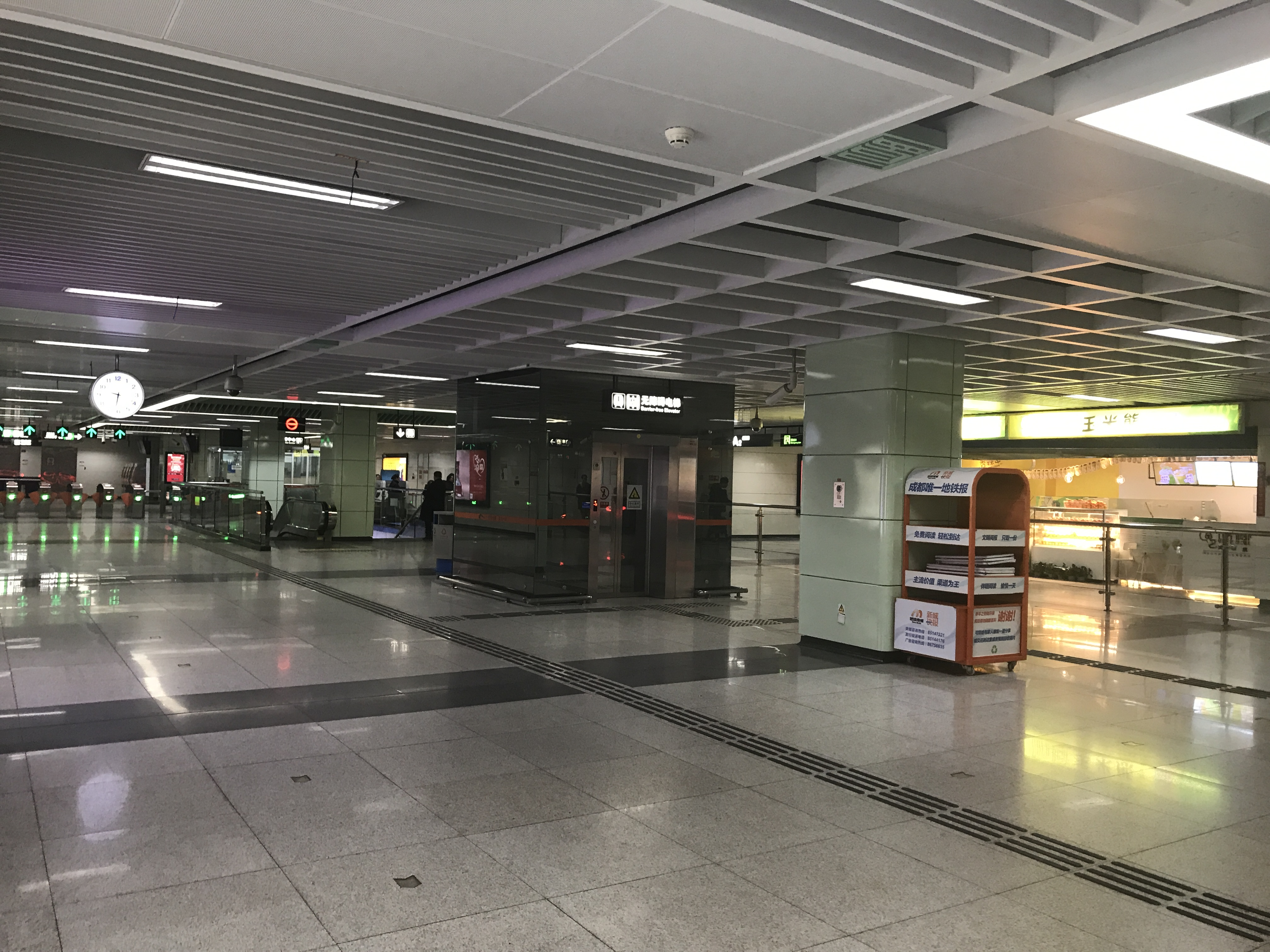
Concourse

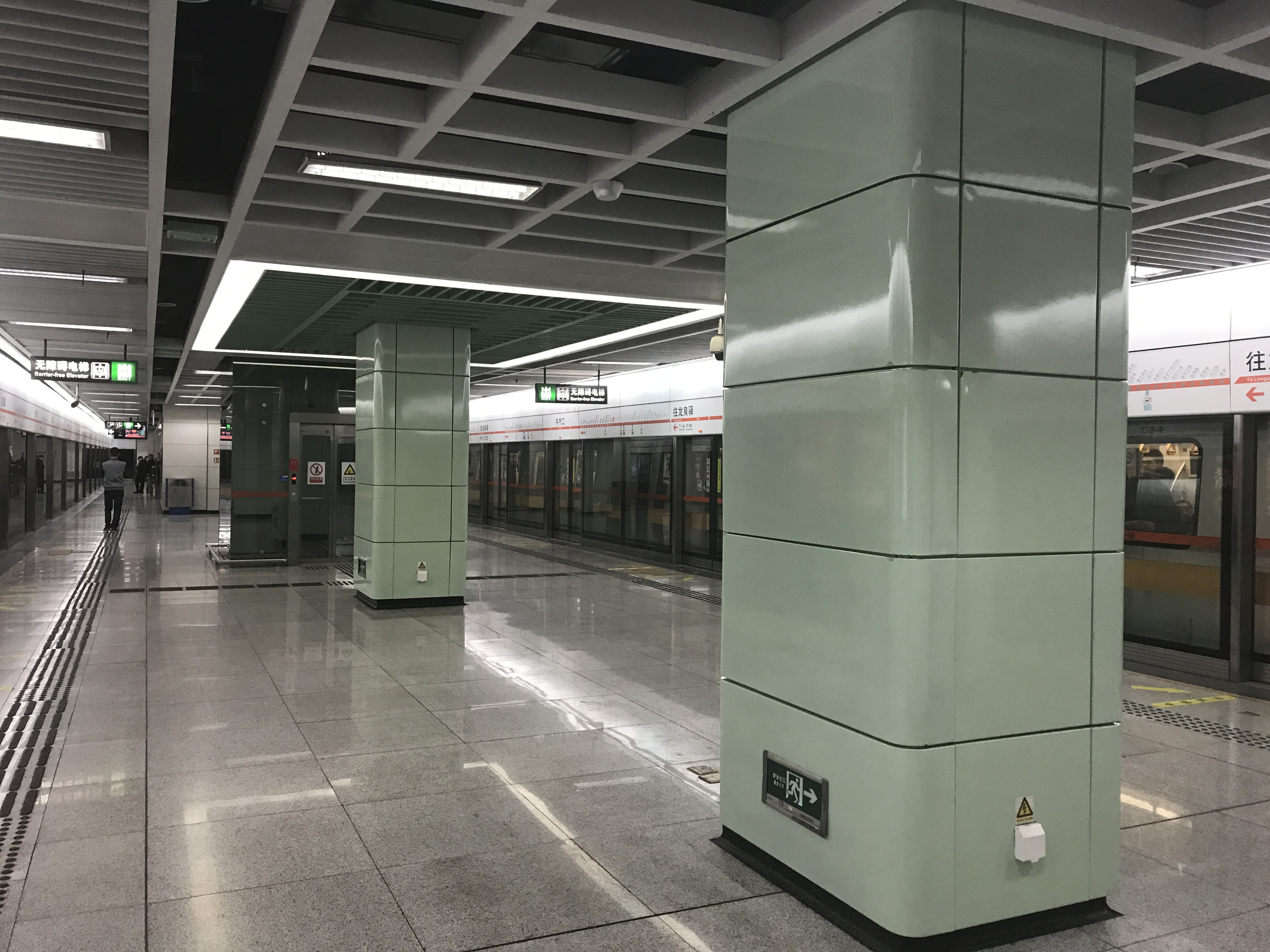
Platform
