= Baicao Road station =

Metro station in Chengdu, China

Baicao Road 百草路

General information
- Location: Pidu District, Chengdu, Sichuan; China
- Coordinates: 30.7356°N 103.9772°E
- Operated by: Chengdu Metro Limited
- Line(s): Line 2
- Platforms: 2 (1 island platform)

Other information
- Station code: 0230

History
- Opened: 8 June 2013

Services
Preceding station	Chengdu Metro	Following station
Jinzhou Road towards Longquanyi	Line 2	Tianhe Road towards Xipu Railway Station

Baicao Road (Chinese: 百草路) is a station on Line 2 of the Chengdu Metro in China.

== Station layout ==
G	Entrances and Exits	Exits A, C, D
B1	Concourse	Faregates, Station Agent
B2	Westbound	← Line 2 towards Xipu (Tianhe Road)
B2	Island platform, doors open on the left
B2	Eastbound	Line 2 towards Longquanyi (Jinzhou Road) →
