= Honghe station =

Subway Station

Honghe 洪河

General information
- Location: Longquanyi District, Chengdu, Sichuan; China
- Coordinates: 30.6073228°N 104.1549613°E
- Operator: Chengdu Metro Limited
- Line: Line 2
- Platforms: 2 (1 island platform)

Other information
- Station code: 0208

History
- Opened: 16 September 2012

Services
Preceding station	Chengdu Metro	Following station
Chengdu Academy of Governance towards Longquanyi	Line 2	Huiwangling towards Xipu Railway Station
Location

Honghe (Chinese: 洪河) is a station on Line 2 of the Chengdu Metro in China.

== Station layout ==
G	Entrances and Exits	Exits A, B
B1	Concourse	Faregates, Station Agent
B2	Westbound	← Line 2 towards Xipu (Huiwangling)
B2	Island platform, doors open on the left
B2	Eastbound	Line 2 towards Longquanyi (Chengdu Academy of Governance) →
