= Dongdalu Road station =

Metro station in Chengdu, China

Dongdalu Road 东大路
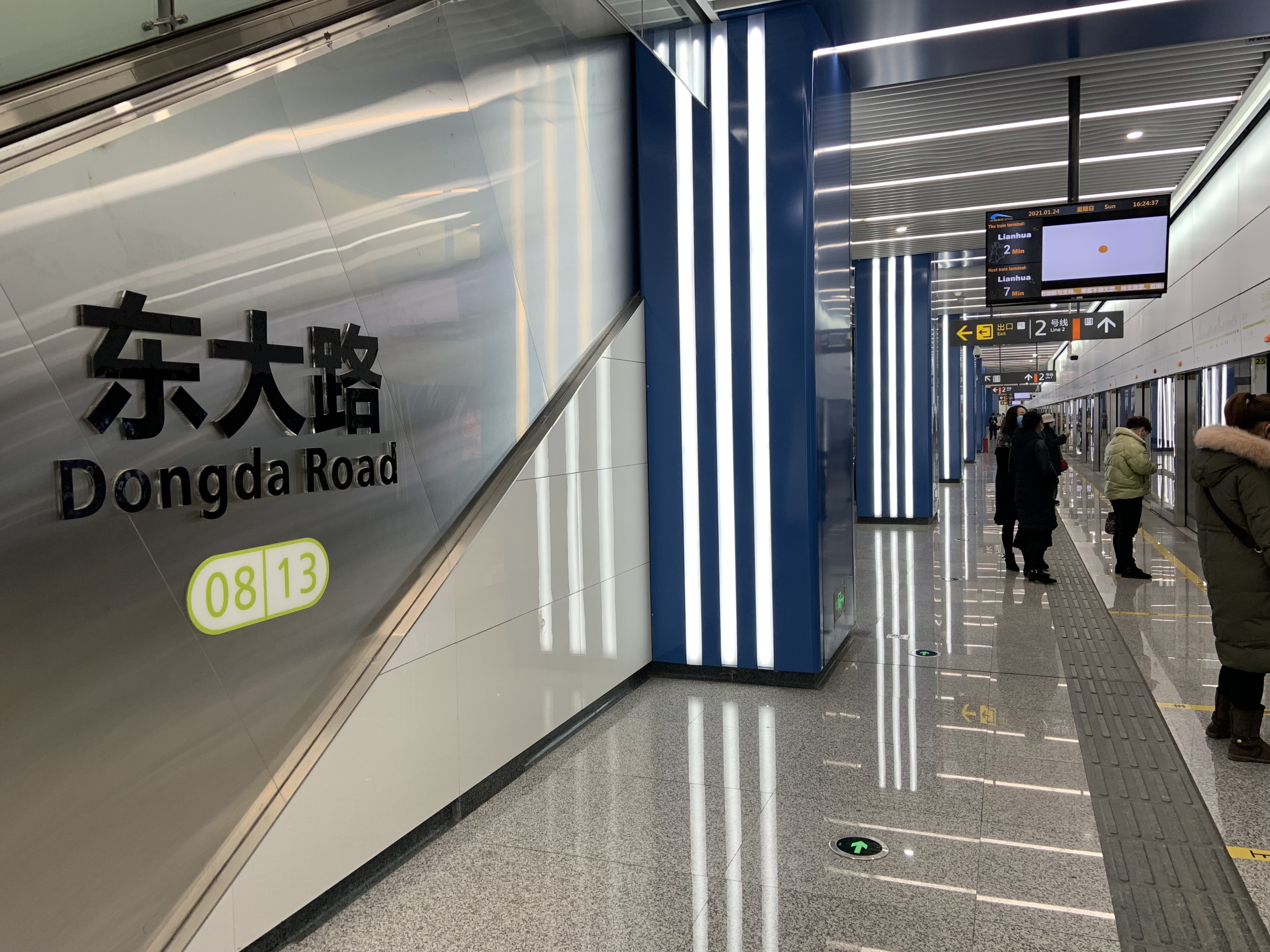
- Line 8 platform

General information
- Location: Dongdalu Road Section of Dongdajie Street × Huiyuan Road South & Huiyuan Road North; Jinjiang District, Chengdu, Sichuan; China
- Coordinates: 30.6360°N 104.1096°E
- Operated by: Chengdu Metro Limited
- Line(s): Line 2 Line 8
- Platforms: 4 (2 island platforms)

Other information
- Station code: 0213 0813

History
- Opened: 16 September 2012
- Previous names: Dongda Road Station

Services
Preceding station	Chengdu Metro	Following station
Tazishan Park towards Longquanyi	Line 2	Niushikou towards Xipu Railway Station
Shuangqiao Road towards Guilong Road	Line 8	Jingjusi towards Longgang

Dongdalu Road station (Chinese: 东大路站; pinyin: Dōngdàlù zhàn) , formerly known as Dongda Road Station, is a station on Line 2 and Line 8 of the Chengdu Metro in China.

== Station layout ==
G	Entrances and Exits	Exits A-G
B1	Concourse	Faregates, Station Agent
B2	Westbound	← Line 2 towards Xipu Railway Station (Niushikou)
B2	Island platform, doors open on the left
B2	Eastbound	Line 2 towards Longquanyi (Tazishan Park) →
B3	Northbound	← Line 8 towards Guilong Road (Shuangqiao Road)
B3	Island platform, doors open on the left
B3	Southbound	Line 8 towards Longgang (Jingjusi) →

== Gallery ==
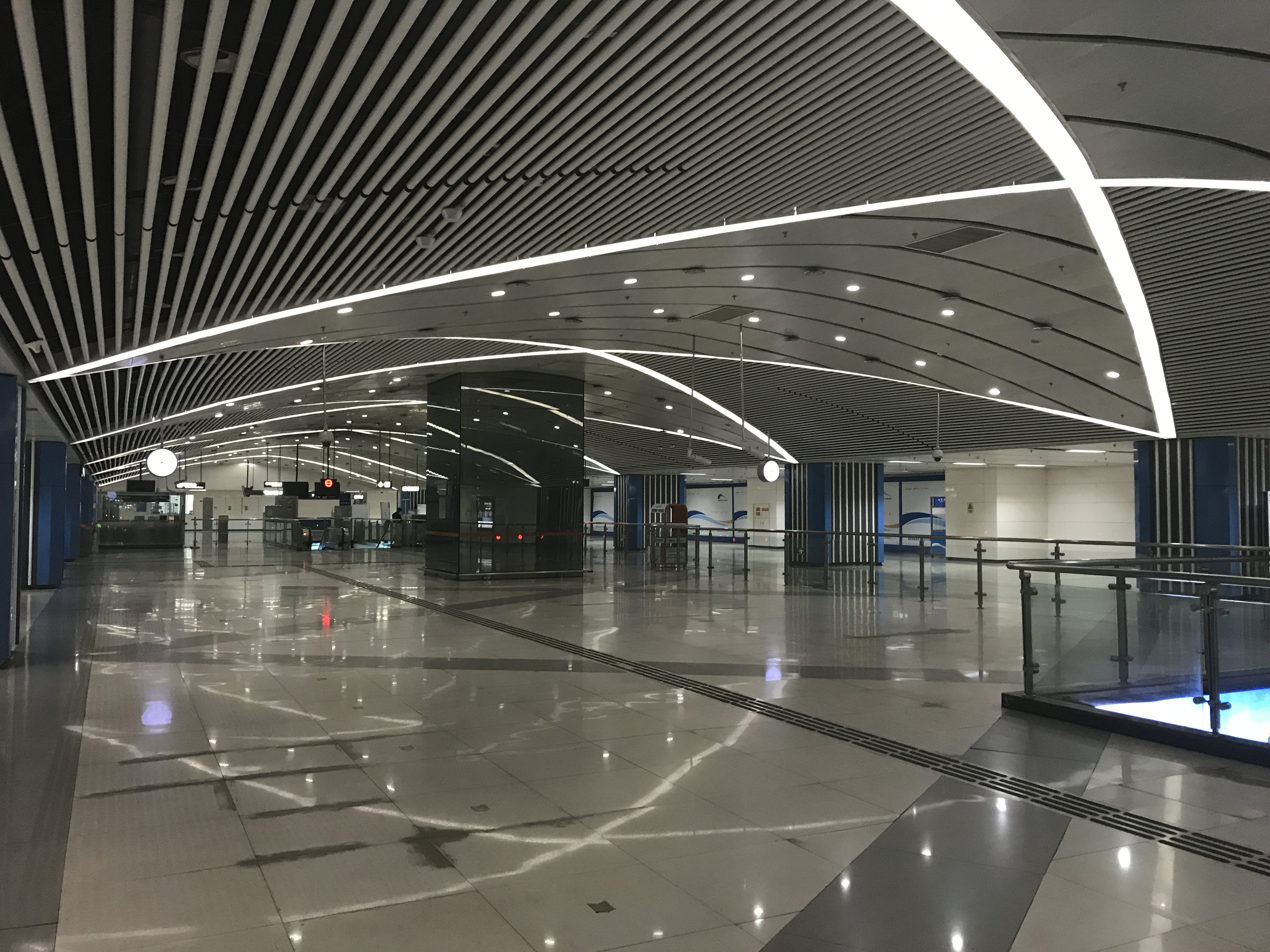
Concourse

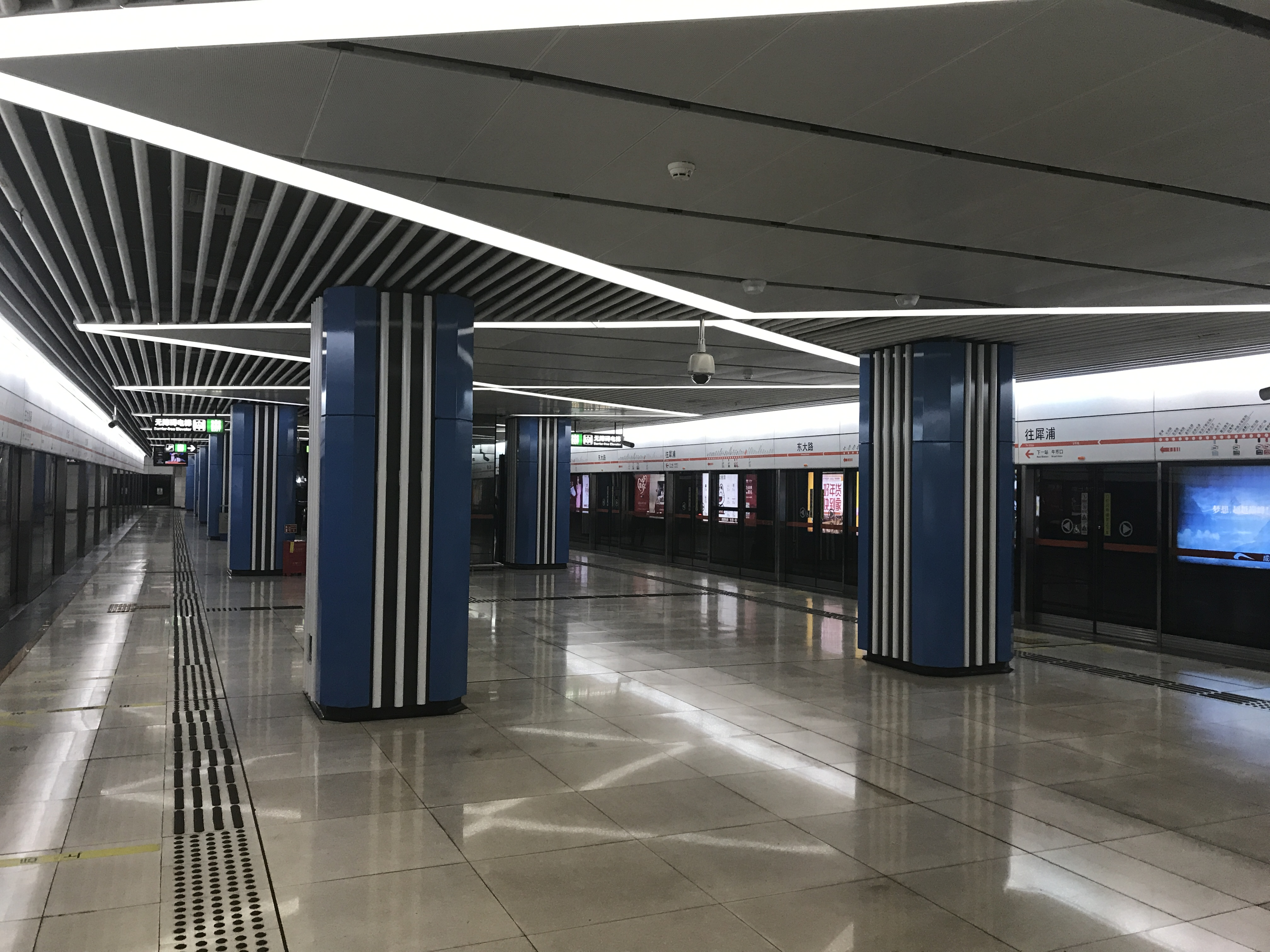
Line 2 platform

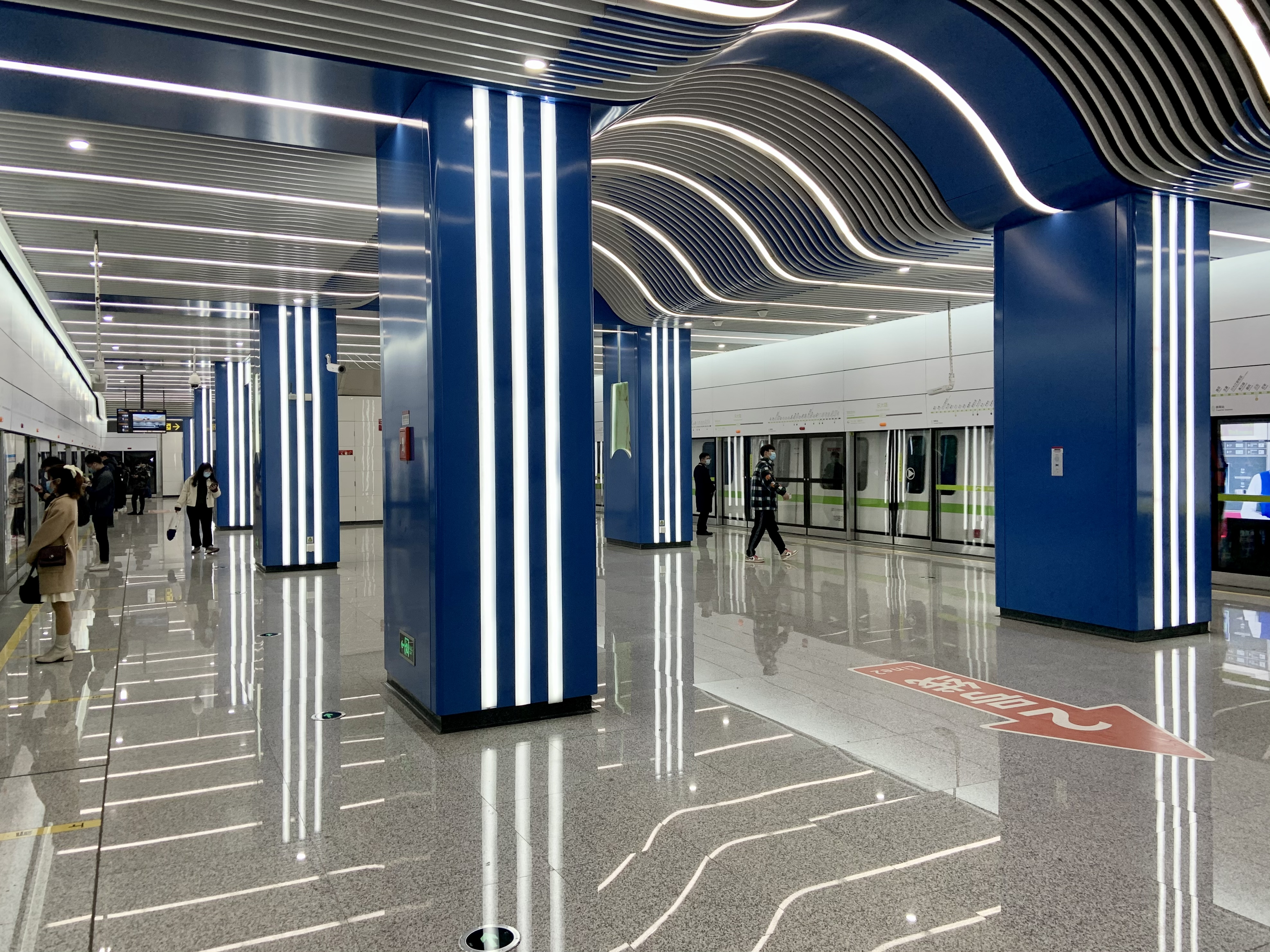
Line 8 platform
