= Tazishan Park station =

Metro station in Chengdu, China

Tazishan Park 塔子山公园
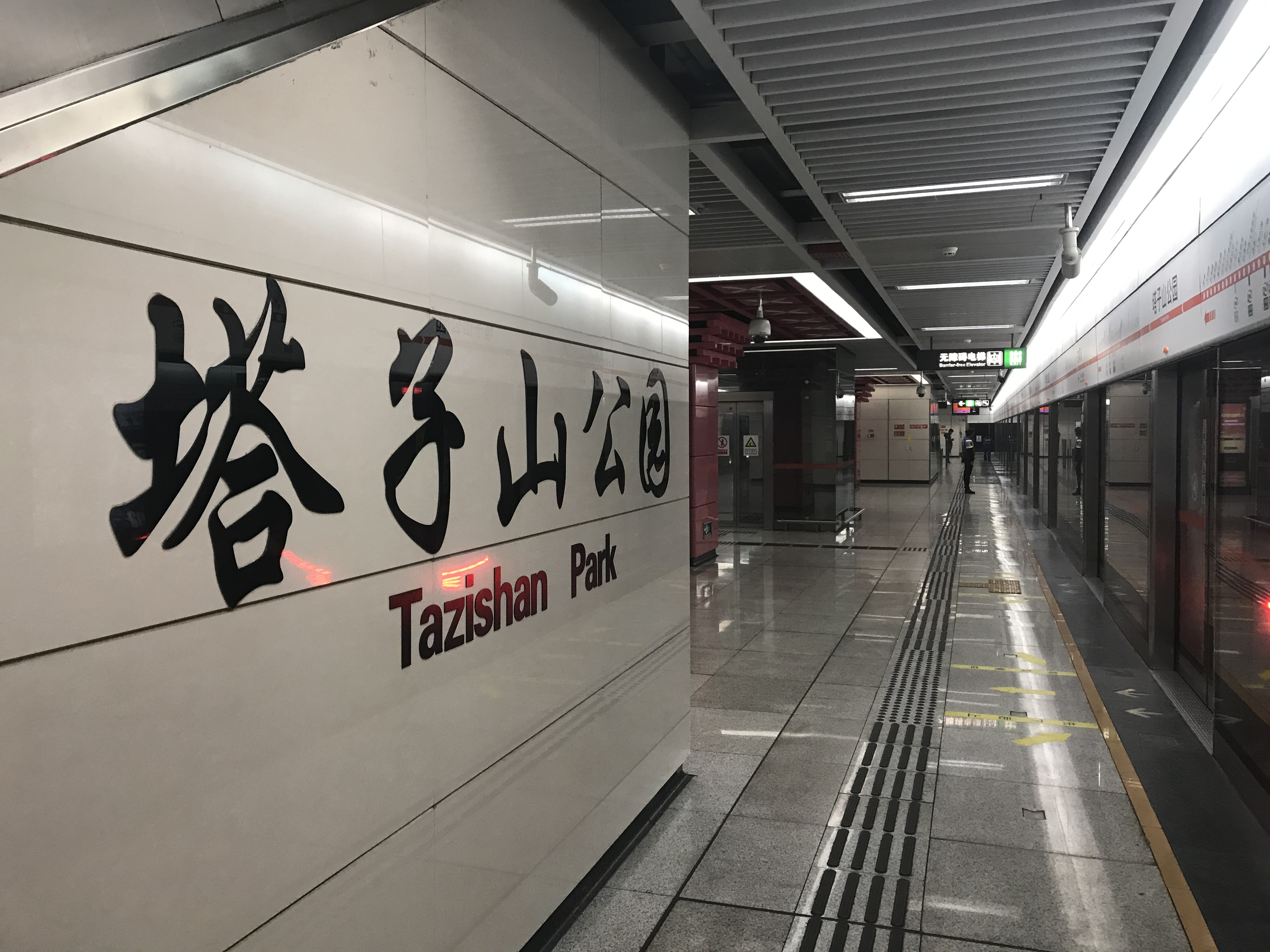

General information
- Location: Jinjiang District, Chengdu, Sichuan; China
- Coordinates: 30.6318334°N 104.1202341°E
- Operated by: Chengdu Metro Limited
- Line: Line 2
- Platforms: 2 (1 island platform)

Other information
- Station code: 0212

History
- Opened: 16 September 2012

Services
Preceding station	Chengdu Metro	Following station
Chengdu East Railway Station towards Longquanyi	Line 2	Dongdalu Road towards Xipu Railway Station
Location

Tazishan Park (Chinese: 塔子山公园) is a station on Line 2 of the Chengdu Metro in China.

== Station layout ==
G	Ground level	Exits A, B, D
B1	Concourse	Faregates, Station Agent
B2	Westbound	← Line 2 towards Xipu Railway Station (Dongdalu Road)
B2	Island platform, doors open on the left
B2	Eastbound	Line 2 towards Longquanyi (Chengdu East Railway Station) →

== Gallery ==
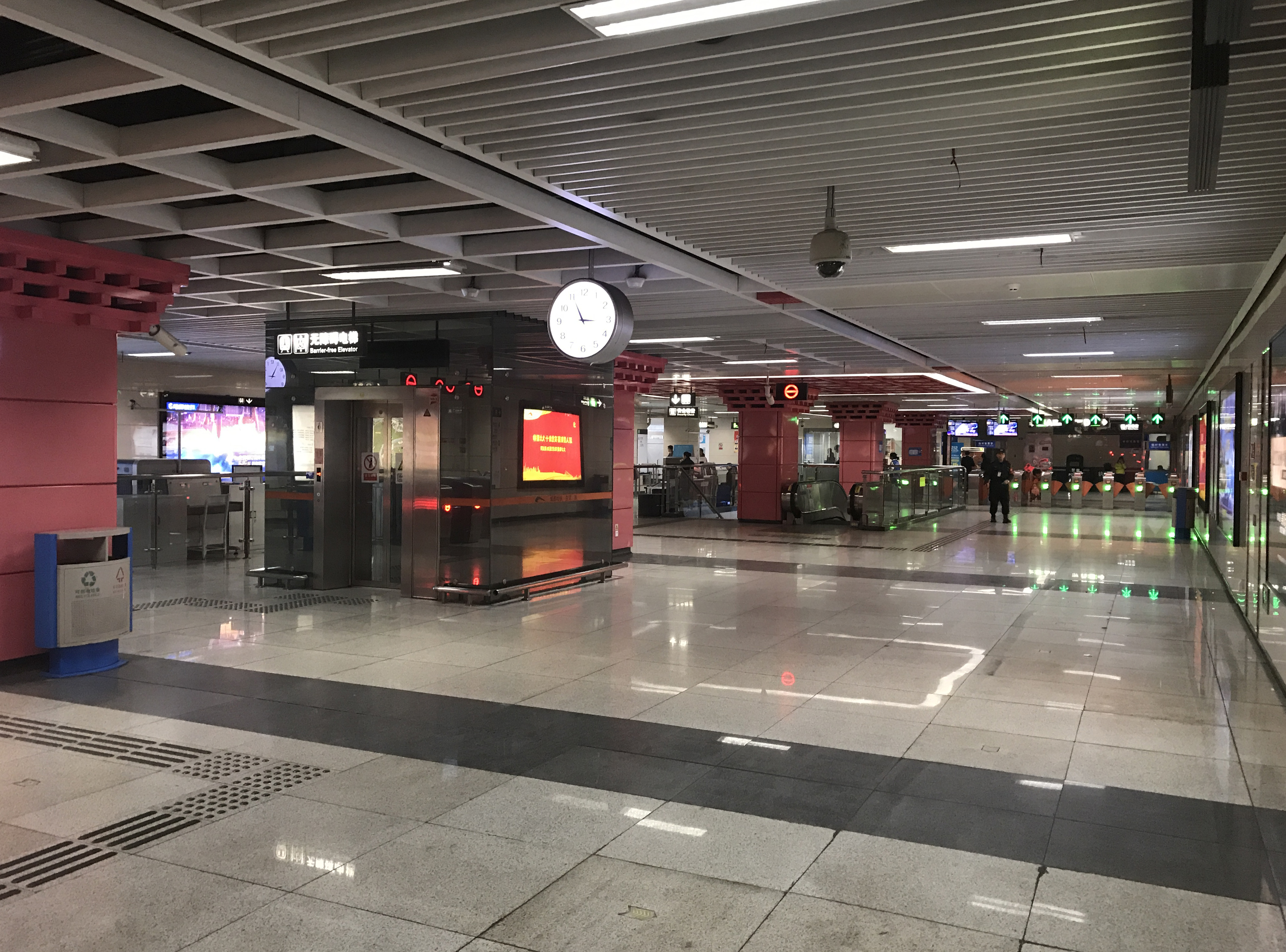
Concourse

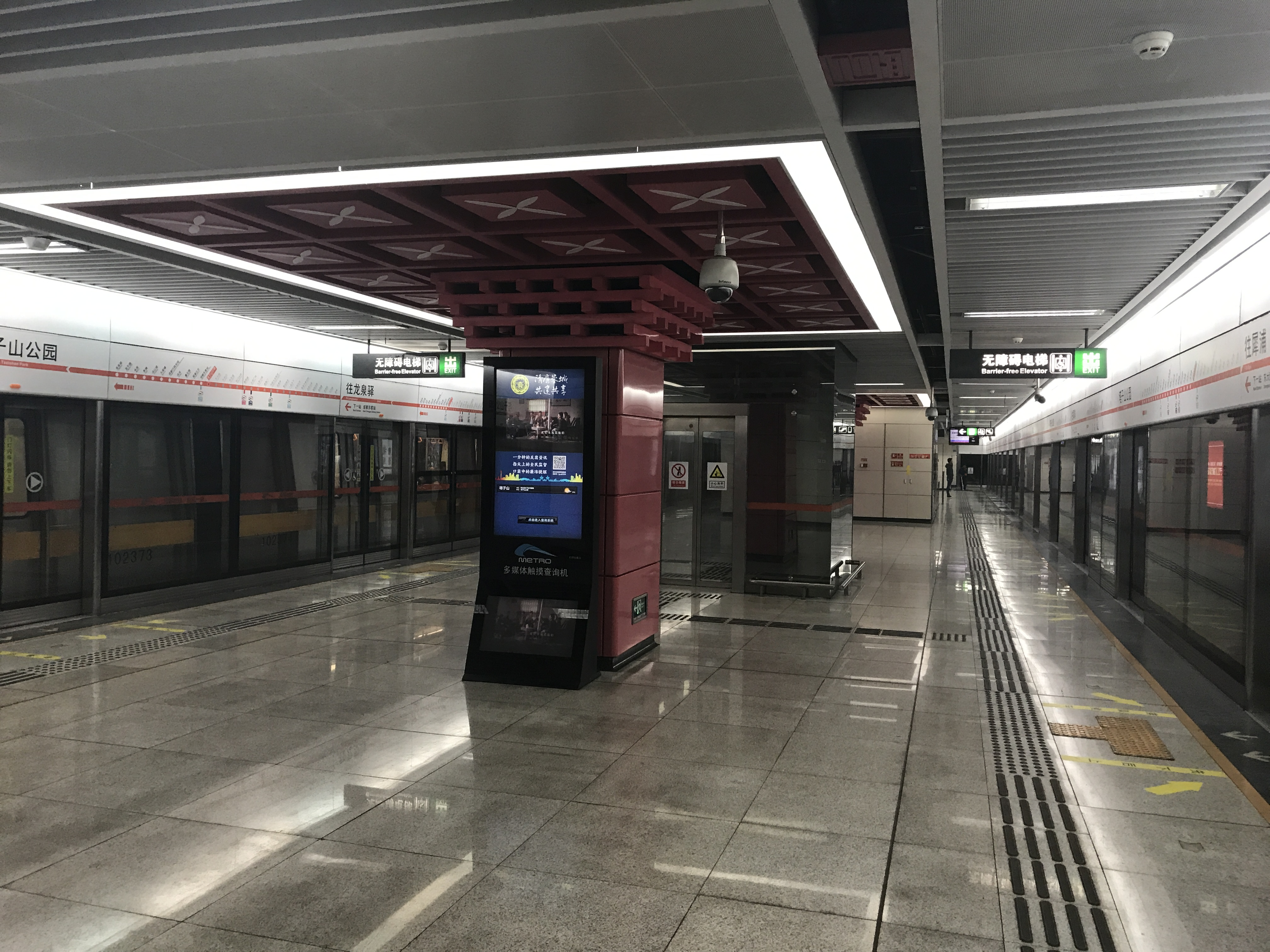
Platform
