= Line 2 (Chengdu Metro) =

Metro line in Chengdu, China

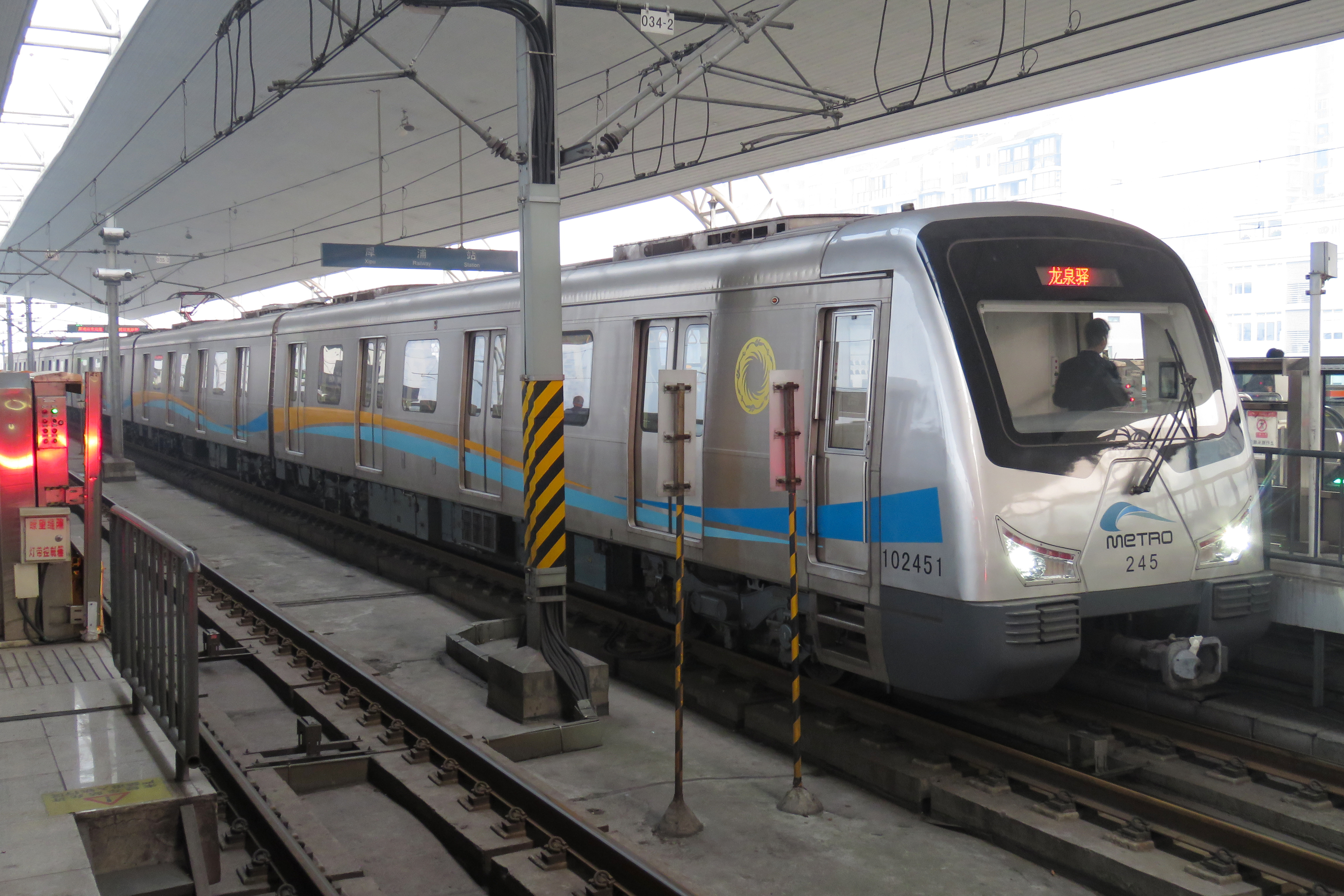
- Train of Line 2 at Xipu station

Overview
- Status: Operational
- Owner: Chengdu
- Locale: Chengdu, China
- Termini: Xipu Railway Station; Longquanyi
- Stations: 33

Service
- Type: Rapid transit
- System: Chengdu Metro
- Services: 1
- Operator: Chengdu Metro Limited
- Daily ridership: 927,200 (2018 Peak)

History
- Opened: 16 September 2012; 14 years ago

Technical
- Line length: 42.27 km (26.27 mi)
- Num of tracks: 2
- Character: Underground and Elevated
- Track gauge: 1,435 mm (4 ft 8 1/2 in)
- Operating speed: 80 km/h (50 mph)

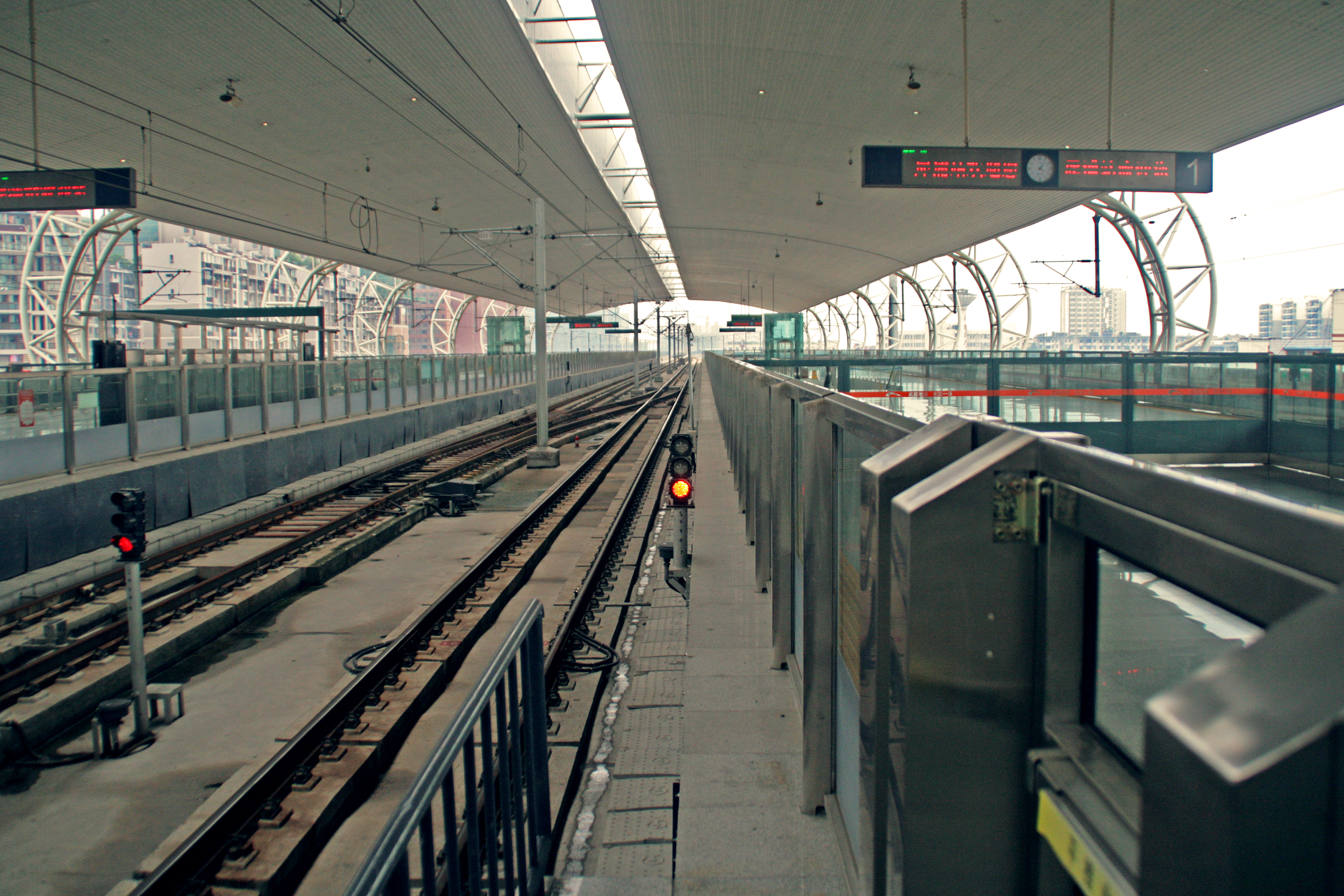
Cross-platform interchanges between different train categories in Xipu Railway Station, Chengdu. The double track of Line 2 of Chengdu Metro is in the middle, while the double track of National rail transport system (Chengdu–Dujiangyan intercity railway) is on both sides, respectively. It is the first implementation of Cross-platform interchanges between different train categories in China.

Line 2 of the Chengdu Metro (Chinese: 成都地铁2号线; pinyin: Chéngdū Dìtiě Èr Hào Xiàn) is the second line on the metro network in Chengdu, Sichuan. Line 2 is a crosstown northwest-southeast trunk route. This line serves the Chengdu East railway station. Line 2 began operation on September 16, 2012. An 11 km long mostly elevated extension to Longquanyi began testing in April 2014 opened in October 2014.

== Opening timeline ==
Segment	Commencement	Length	Station(s)	Name
Chadianzi Bus Terminal — Chengdu Academy of Governance	16 September 2012	22.4 km (13.92 mi)	20	Phase 1
Chadianzi Bus Terminal — Xipu Railway Station	8 June 2013	8.8 km (5.47 mi)	6	Phase 2 (western section)
Chengdu Academy of Governance — Longquanyi	26 October 2014	11.1 km (6.90 mi)	6	Phase 2 (eastern section)
Longquanyi Railway Station	30 October 2026		1	Infill station

== Stations ==
- OSI: Out-of-Station Interchange

Service routes		Station №	Station name		Connections	Distance km		Location
Service routes		Station №	English	Chinese	Connections	Distance km		Location
●	●	0233	Xipu Railway Station	犀浦	6 CG	0.00	0.00	Pidu
●	●	0232	Tianhe Road	天河路	T2	1.85	1.85	Pidu
●	●	0231	Baicao Road	百草路		1.65	3.50	Pidu
●	●	0230	Jinzhou Road	金周路	9	2.20	5.70	Jinniu
●	●	0229	Jinke North Road	金科北路		1.15	6.85	Jinniu
●	●	0228	Yingbin Avenue	迎宾大道		1.05	7.90	Jinniu
●	●	0227	Chadianzi Bus Terminal Station	茶店子客运站		0.90	8.80	Jinniu
●	●	0226	Yangxi Flyover	羊犀立交	27	1.50	10.30	Jinniu
●	●	0225	Yipintianxia	一品天下	7	0.85	11.15	Jinniu
●	●	0224	Shuhan Road East	蜀汉路东		1.10	12.25	Jinniu
●	●	0223	Baiguolin	白果林		1.25	13.50	Jinniu
●	●	0222	Chengdu University of TCM & Sichuan Provincial People's Hospital	中医大·省医院	4 5	1.15	14.65	Qingyang
●	●	0221	Tonghuimen	通惠门		0.85	15.50	Qingyang
●	●	0220	People's Park	人民公园	10 17	0.85	16.35	Qingyang
●	●	0219	Tianfu Square	天府广场	1	0.95	17.30	Qingyang
●	●	0218	Chunxi Road	春熙路	3	1.40	18.70	Jinjiang
●	●	0217	Dongmen Bridge	东门大桥		0.95	19.65	Jinjiang
●	●	0216	Niuwangmiao	牛王庙	6	0.80	20.45	Jinjiang
●	●	0215	Niushikou	牛市口	Chengdu BRT	1.60	22.05	Jinjiang
●	●	0214	Dongdalu Road	东大路	8	0.60	22.65	Jinjiang
●	●	0213	Tazishan Park	塔子山公园		1.15	23.80	Jinjiang
●	●	0212	Chengdu East Railway Station	成都东客站	7 ICW	1.65	25.45	Chenghua
●	●	0211	Chengyu Flyover	成渝立交		0.80	26.25	Chenghua
●	●	0210	Huiwangling	惠王陵	30	1.60	27.85	Longquanyi
●	●	0209	Honghe	洪河		0.95	28.80	Longquanyi
●	●	0208	Chengdu Academy of Governance	成都行政学院	9	1.50	30.30	Longquanyi
●		0207	Longquanyi Railway Station	龙泉驿火车站	30 (OSI via Longquanyi Railway Station South); CEE	2.79	33.09	Longquanyi
●		0206	Damianpu	大面铺		0.58	33.67	Longquanyi
●		0205	Lianshanpo	连山坡		1.25	34.75	Longquanyi
●		0204	Jiepai	界牌		1.25	36.00	Longquanyi
●		0203	Shufang	书房		1.85	37.85	Longquanyi
●		0202	Longping Road	龙平路		1.90	39.75	Longquanyi
●		0201	Longquanyi	龙泉驿		1.70	41.45	

== Rolling Stock ==
The rolling stocks of Chengdu Metro Line 2 are all manufactured by CRRC Qingdao Sifang, formerly CSR Qingdao Sifang. Each set has 8 type-B cars, 4 power cars and 2 trailers. It has a maximum operating speed of 80 km/h and are all maintained by the Chengdu Metro Hongliu depot.

=== SFM14.1 (201-232) ===
Designated by the manufacturer as SFM14 (Sifang Metro 14), it is the original phase 1 rolling stock of line 2. 32 sets of SFM14 are ordered for the opening of line 2 in 2012.
