= Longping Road station =

Metro station in Chengdu, China

Longping Road 龙平路

General information
- Location: Longquanyi District, Chengdu, Sichuan; China
- Coordinates: 30.5755409°N 104.2565400°E
- Operator: Chengdu Metro Limited
- Line: Line 2
- Platforms: 2 (1 island platform)

Other information
- Station code: 0202

History
- Opened: 26 October 2014

Services
Preceding station	Chengdu Metro	Following station
Longquanyi Terminus	Line 2	Shufang towards Xipu Railway Station
Location

Longping Road (Chinese: 龙平路) is a station on Line 2 of the Chengdu Metro in China.

== Station layout ==
G	Entrances and Exits	Exits A-D
B1	Concourse	Faregates, Station Agent
B2	Westbound	← Line 2 towards Xipu (Shufang)
B2	Island platform, doors open on the left
B2	Eastbound	Line 2 towards Longquanyi (Terminus) →
