= Longquanyi station =

Metro station in Chengdu, China

Longquanyi 龙泉驿

General information
- Location: Longquanyi District, Chengdu, Sichuan; China
- Coordinates: 30.5629008°N 104.2659429°E
- Operator: Chengdu Metro Limited
- Line: Line 2
- Platforms: 2 (1 island platform)

Other information
- Station code: 0201

History
- Opened: 26 October 2014

Services
Preceding station	Chengdu Metro	Following station
Terminus	Line 2	Longping Road towards Xipu Railway Station
Location

Longquanyi (Chinese: 龙泉驿) is a station on Line 2 of the Chengdu Metro in China. It is the eastern terminus of Line 2.

== Station layout ==
G	Entrances and Exits	Exits A, B, D, E
B1	Concourse	Faregates, Station Agent
B2	Westbound	← Line 2 to Xipu (Longping Road)
B2	Island platform, doors open on the left
B2	Eastbound	Line 2 termination track →
