= Ande railway station =

Railway station in Chengdu, China

Coordinates: 30°52′36″N 103°48′36″E

Ande 安德
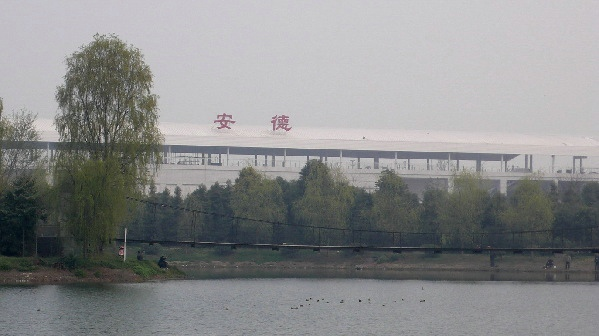

General information
- Location: Pidu District, Chengdu, Sichuan; China
- Operated by: Chengdu Railway Bureau, China Railway Corporation
- Line: Chengdu–Dujiangyan Intercity Railway
- Platforms: 2

History
- Opened: 2010
Location

The Ande railway station (Chinese: 安德站; pinyin: Āndé Zhàn) is a railway station on the Chengdu–Dujiangyan Intercity Railway in Pidu District, Chengdu, Sichuan, China. This station has been fully built but no trains currently stop at Ande.

== See also ==
- Chengdu–Dujiangyan Intercity Railway

| Preceding station | China Railway High-speed | Following station |
|---|---|---|
| Pixian West towards Chengdu | Chengdu–Dujiangyan intercity railway | Juyuan towards Qingchengshan or Lidui Park |
