= Chengdu =

Capital of Sichuan, China

Chengdu 成都市 Chengtu
- Prefecture-level and sub-provincial city
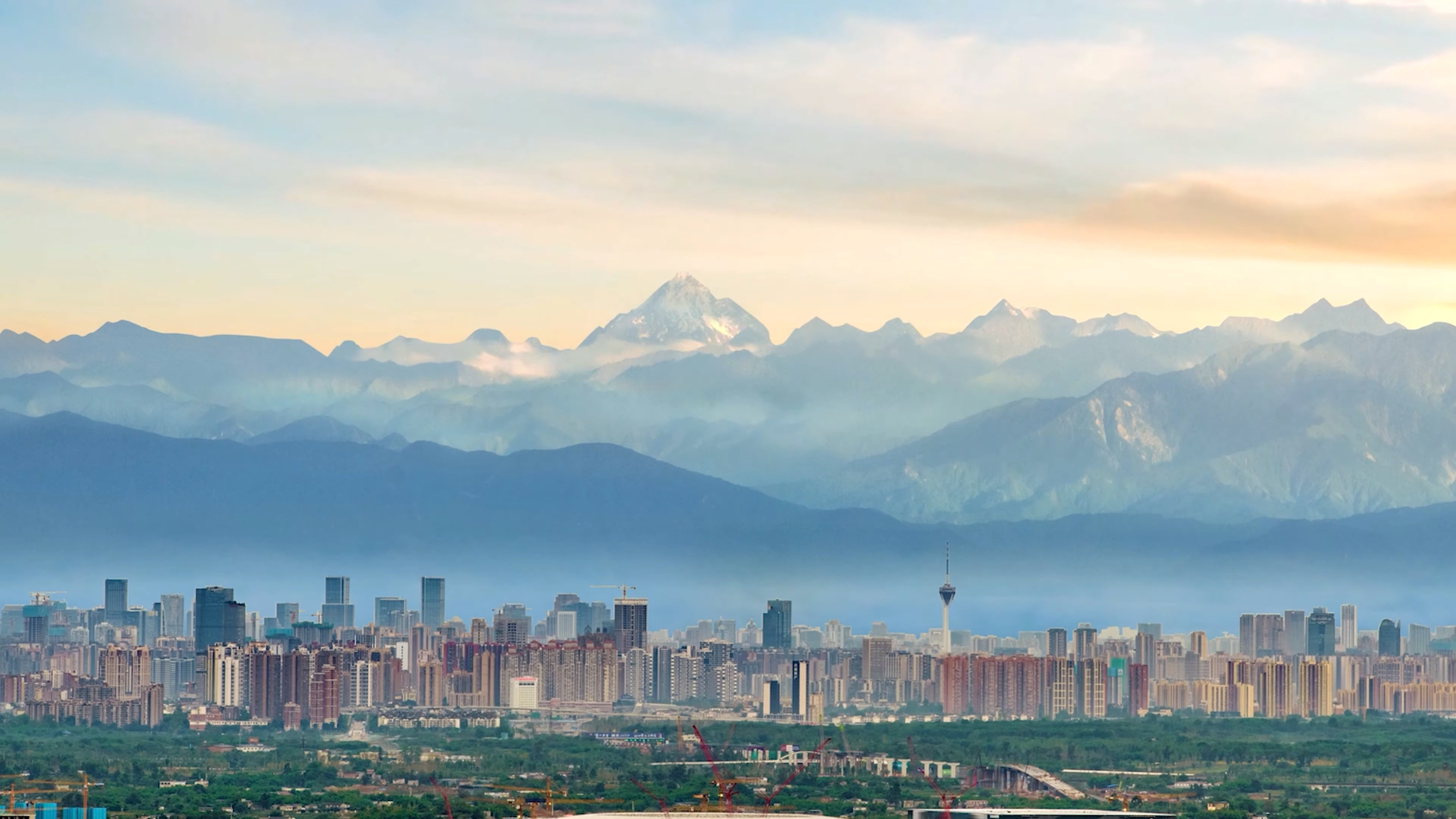
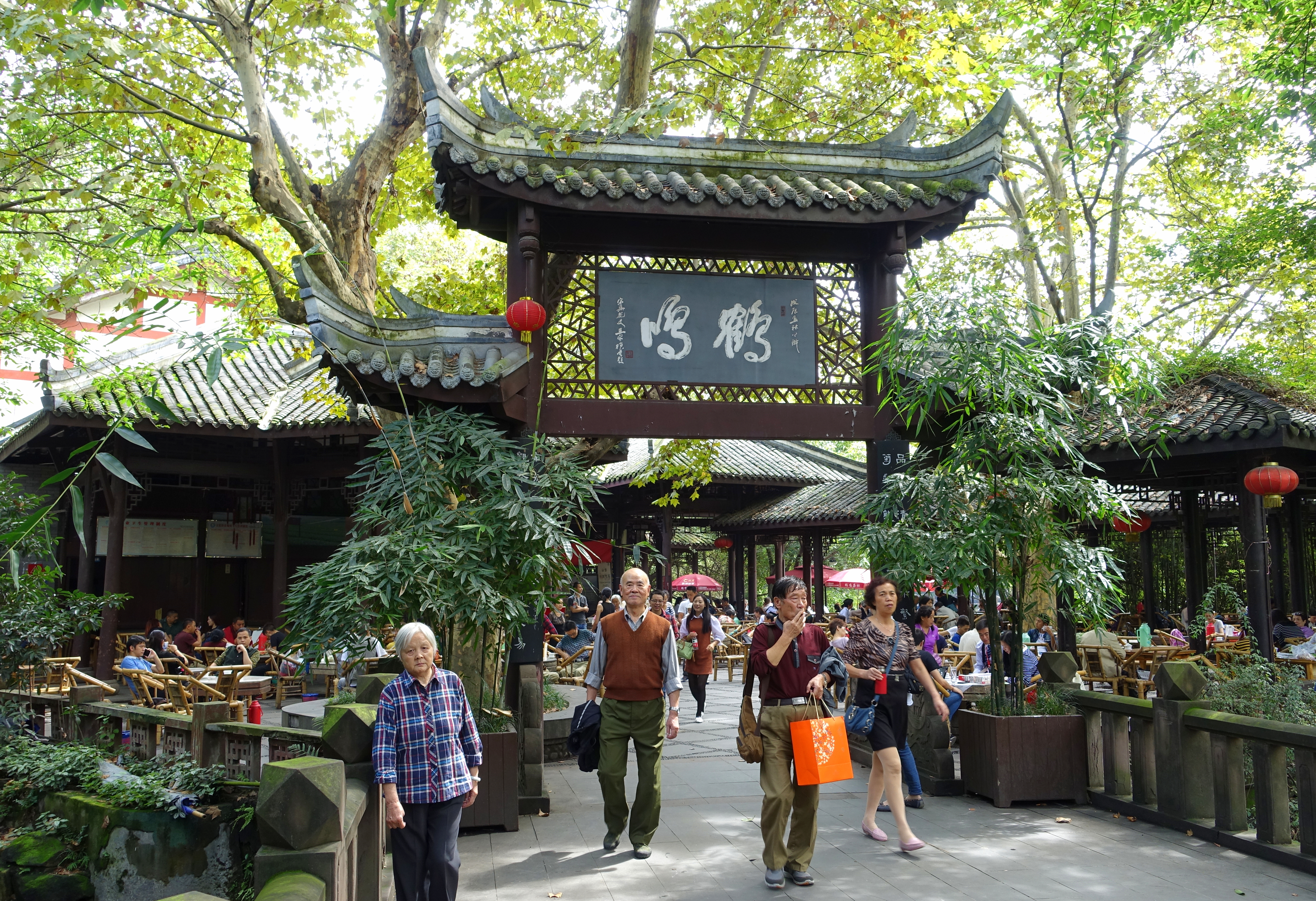
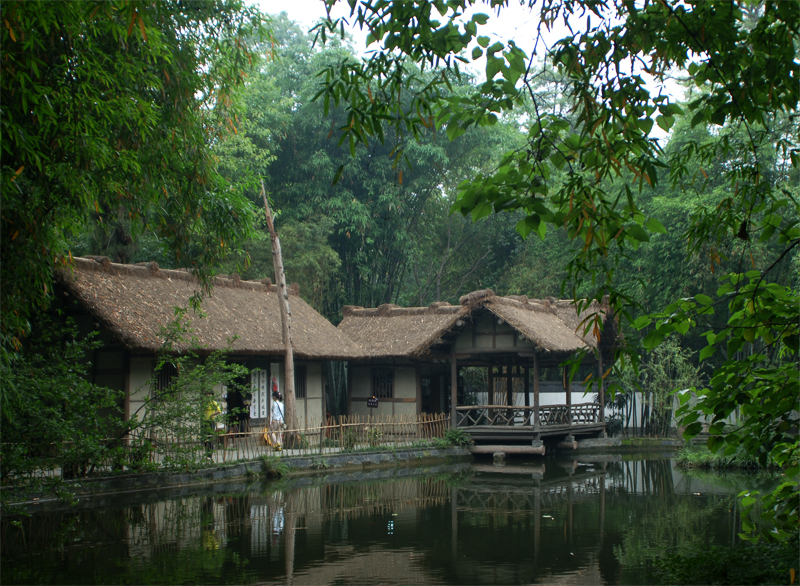
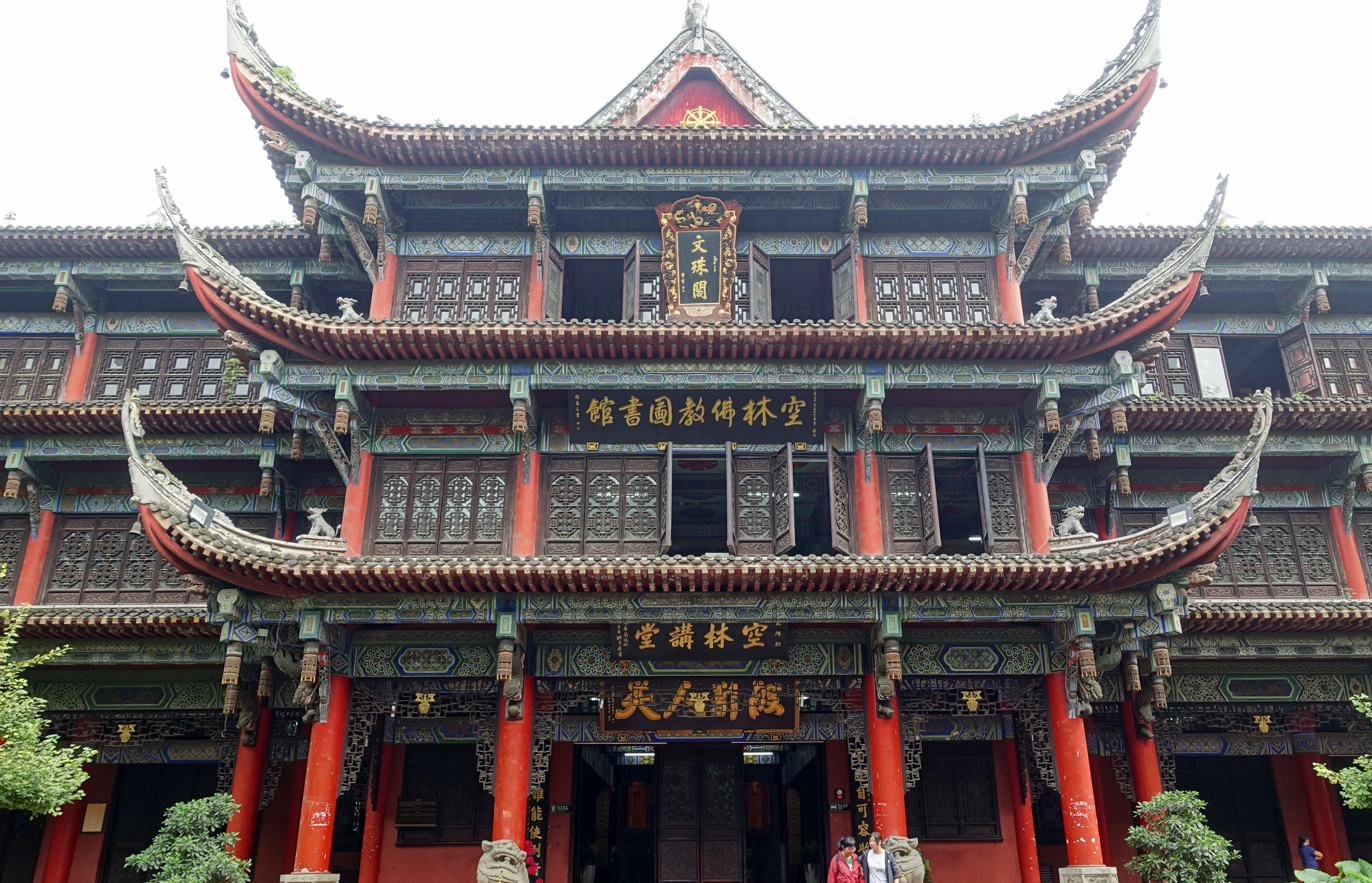
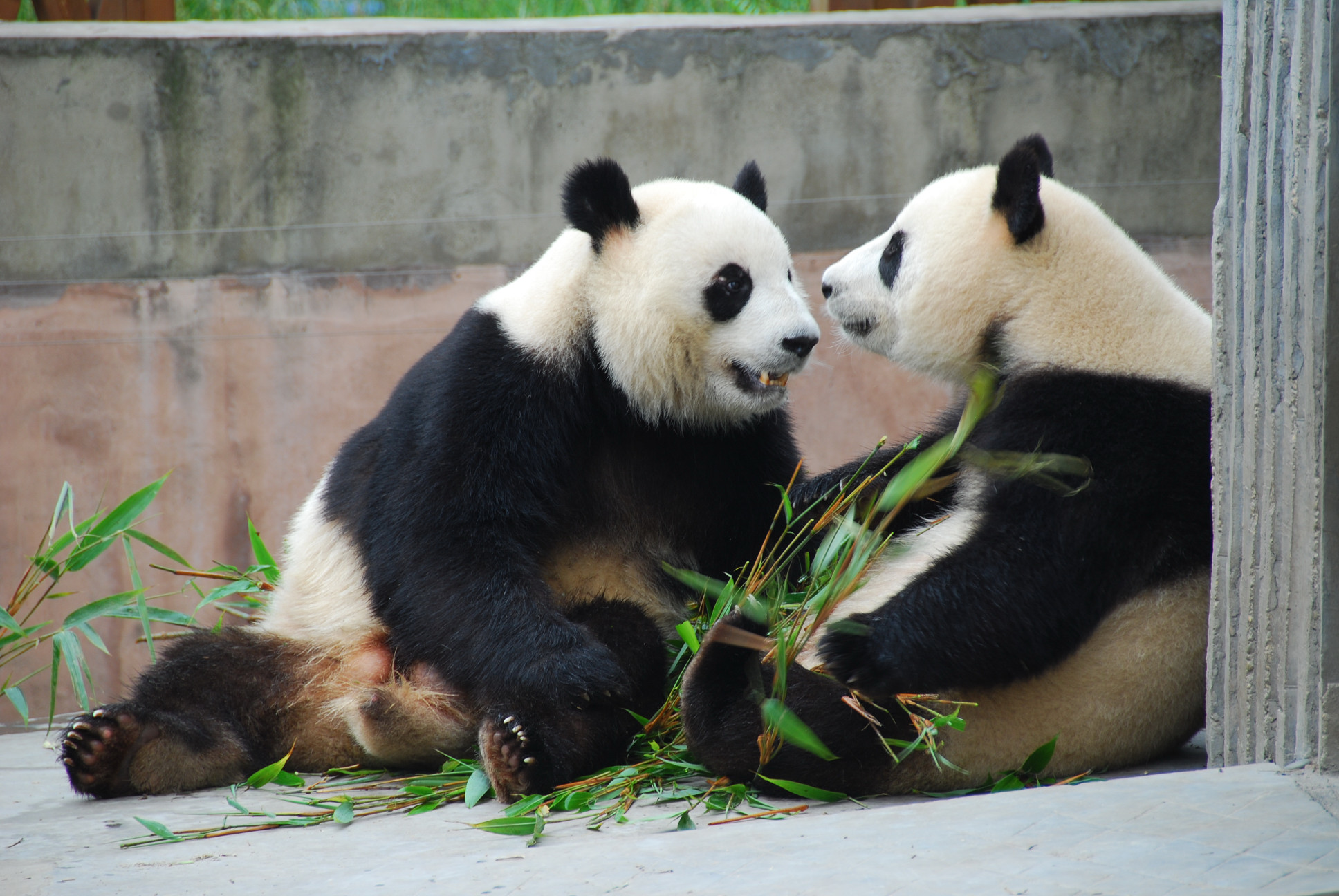
- Chengdu skyline with Qionglai Mountains People's Park Kuanzhai Alleys Du Fu Thatched Cottage Wenshu Temple Chengdu Research Base of Giant Panda Breeding Anshun Bridge

- Emblem of the City of Chengdu
- Nicknames: Hibiscus City, Brocade City
- Interactive map of Chengdu
- Location of the city center in Sichuan Chengdu (China)
- Coordinates (Tianfu Square): 30°39′36″N 104°03′48″E
- Country: China
- Province: Sichuan
- Established: 4th century BC
- Founder: Kingdom of Shu
- Municipal seat: Wuhou District
- Divisions: County-level: 12 districts, 5 county-level cities, 3 counties

Government
  - Type: Sub-provincial city
  - Body: Chengdu Municipal People's Congress
  - CCP Secretary: Cao Lijun
  - Congress Chairman: Li Zhongbin
  - Mayor: Chen Shuping
  - CPPCC Chairman: Zhang Shan

Area
  - City: 14,378.18 km^{2} (5,551.45 sq mi)
  - Urban: 3,679.9 km^{2} (1,420.8 sq mi)
  - Metro: 4,558.8 km^{2} (1,760.2 sq mi)
  - Downtown: 465.88 km^{2} (179.88 sq mi)
- Elevation: 500 m (1,600 ft)
- Highest elevation: 5,364 m (17,598 ft)
- Lowest elevation: 378 m (1,240 ft)

Population (2020 census)
  - City: 20,937,757
  - Density: 1,456.217/km^{2} (3,771.586/sq mi)
  - Urban: 16,492,980
  - Urban density: 4,481.9/km^{2} (11,608/sq mi)
  - Metro: 16,045,577
  - Metro density: 3,519.7/km^{2} (9,116.0/sq mi)
  - Major ethnic group: Han

GDP(2025)
  - City: CN¥ 2.476 trillion US$ 347.89 billion
  - Per capita: CN¥ 115,115; US$ 16,780
- Time zone: UTC+08:00 (China Standard)
- Postal code: 610000–611944
- Area code: (0)28
- ISO 3166 code: CN-SC-01
- License plate prefix: 川A and 川G
- Tree: Ginkgo biloba
- Flower: Hibiscus mutabilis
- HDI (2019): 0.831 (21st) – high
- Website: www.chengdu.gov.cn

Chengdu
- "Chengdu" in Chinese characters
- Chinese: 成都
- Hanyu Pinyin: Chéngdū
- Cen^{2}du^{1}
- Postal: Chingtu
- Literal meaning: Established Capital City
Transcriptions
Standard Mandarin
- Hanyu Pinyin: Chéngdū
- Bopomofo: ㄔㄥˊ ㄉㄨ
- Gwoyeu Romatzyh: Cherngdu
- Wade–Giles: Chʻêng^{2}-tu^{1}
- Tongyong Pinyin: Chéngdu
- Yale Romanization: ChéngDū
- IPA: [ʈʂʰə̌ŋtú]
other Mandarin
- Sichuanese Pinyin: Cen^{2}du^{1}
Wu
- Suzhounese: Zen^{2}-tou^{1}
Yue: Cantonese
- Yale Romanization: Sìhngdōu
- Jyutping: sing4 dou1
- IPA: [sɪŋ˩tɔw˥]
Southern Min
- Hokkien POJ: Sêng-to͘

Former name

Xījīng
- Chinese: 西京
- Literal meaning: Western Capital
Transcriptions
Standard Mandarin
- Hanyu Pinyin: Xījīng
- Bopomofo: ㄒㄧ ㄐㄧㄥ
- Gwoyeu Romatzyh: Shijing
- Wade–Giles: Hsi^{1}-ching^{1}
- Tongyong Pinyin: Sijing
- Yale Romanization: Syījīng
- IPA: [ɕí.tɕíŋ]

Nicknames

City of Brocade
- Traditional Chinese: 錦城
- Simplified Chinese: 锦城
- Literal meaning: Brocade City
Transcriptions
Standard Mandarin
- Hanyu Pinyin: Jǐnchéng
- Bopomofo: ㄐㄧㄣˇ ㄔㄥˊ
- Gwoyeu Romatzyh: Jiincherng
- Wade–Giles: Chin^{3}-chʻêng^{2}
- Tongyong Pinyin: Jǐnchéng
- Yale Romanization: JǐnChéng
- IPA: [tɕìn.ʈʂʰə̌ŋ]

City of Hibiscus
- Chinese: 蓉城
- Literal meaning: Hibiscus City
Transcriptions
Standard Mandarin
- Hanyu Pinyin: Róngchéng
- Bopomofo: ㄖㄨㄥˊ ㄔㄥˊ
- Gwoyeu Romatzyh: Rongcherng
- Wade–Giles: Jung^{2}-chʻêng^{2}
- Tongyong Pinyin: Róngchéng
- Yale Romanization: RúngChéng
- IPA: [ɻʊ̌ŋ.ʈʂʰə̌ŋ]

Chengdu (Note: /tʃɛŋˈduː/; Chinese: 成都; pinyin: Chéngdū; Sichuanese pronunciation: [tsʰən˨˩tu˥], Standard Chinese pronunciation: [ʈʂʰə̌ŋ.tú]; previously romanized as Chengtu.) is the capital city of the Chinese province of Sichuan. With a population of 20,937,757 at the 2020 census, it is the country's fourth most populous city and the only city with a population of over 20 million apart from provincial-level municipalities. It is traditionally the hub of Western China.

Chengdu is in central Sichuan. The surrounding Chengdu Plain is known as the "Country of Heaven" (Note: Chinese: 天府之国; pinyin: Tiānfǔ zhi Guó) and the "Land of Abundance". Its prehistoric settlers included the Sanxingdui culture. The site of Dujiangyan, an ancient irrigation system, is designated as a World Heritage Site. The Jin River flows through the city. Chengdu's culture reflects that of its province, Sichuan; in 2011, it was recognized by UNESCO as a city of gastronomy. It is associated with the giant panda, a Chinese national symbol that inhabits the area of Sichuan; the city is home to the Chengdu Research Base of Giant Panda Breeding.

Founded by the Kingdom of Shu in the 4th century BC, Chengdu is unique as the only Chinese settlement that has maintained its name unchanged throughout the imperial, republican, and communist eras for more than two thousand years. It was the capital of Liu Bei's Shu Han Empire during the Three Kingdoms Era, as well as several other local kingdoms during the Middle Ages. During World War II, refugees from eastern China fleeing from the Japanese settled in Chengdu. After the war, Chengdu was briefly the capital of the Nationalist republican government until it withdrew to Taipei on the island of Taiwan. Under the PRC, Chengdu's importance as a link between Eastern China and Western China expanded, with railways built to Chongqing in 1952, and Kunming and Tibet afterward. In the 1960s, Chengdu became an important defense industry hub.

Chengdu is one of the most important economic, financial, commercial, cultural, transportation, research, and communication centers in China. Its economy is diverse, characterized by the machinery, automobile, medical, food, and information technology industries. Chengdu is a leading financial hub, ranking 35th globally on the 2021 Global Financial Centres Index. Chengdu also hosts many international companies; more than 315 Fortune 500 companies have established branches in the city. Chengdu is the third Chinese city with two international airports after Beijing and Shanghai. Chengdu Shuangliu International Airport, and the newly built Tianfu International Airport, a hub of Air China and Sichuan Airlines, is one of the 30 busiest airports in the world, and the Chengdu railway station is one of the six biggest in China. Chengdu is considered a "Beta + (global second-tier)" city classification (along with Barcelona and Washington, D.C.) according to the GaWC. As of 2023, the city also hosts 23 foreign consulates, the fourth most in China behind Beijing, Shanghai, and Guangzhou. Chengdu is the seat of the Western Theater Command region of the People's Liberation Army. In 2023, Chengdu became the third Chinese city to host the Summer World University Games, after Beijing and Shenzhen. In 2025, the city also hosted the World Games. It is considered one of China's best cities to live in, and also a national central city.

Chengdu is a major city for scientific outputs, ranking at #21 globally and 2nd in Western China after Xi'an. The city is home to the greatest number of universities and research institutes in Western China. Notably, these include: Sichuan University, University of Electronic Science and Technology of China, Southwestern University of Finance and Economics, Southwest Jiaotong University, Chengdu University of Technology, Sichuan Normal University, and Xihua University.

== Name ==
The name Chengdu is attested in sources dating back to the Warring States period. It has been called the only major city in China to have remained at an unchanged location with an unchanged name throughout the imperial, republican, and communist eras. However, it also had other names; for example, it was briefly known as "Xijing" (Western Capital) in the 17th century. The etymology of the name is unclear. The earliest and most widely known explanation, although not generally accepted by modern scholars, is provided in the 10th-century geographical work Universal Geography of the Taiping Era, which states that the ninth king of Shu's Kaiming dynasty named his new capital Chengdu after a statement by King Tai of Zhou that a settlement needed "one year to become a town, two to become a city, and three to become a metropolis." (Note: Chinese: 以周太王从梁王止岐山，一年而所居成聚，二年成邑，三年成都，因名之成都。) (The character for cheng Chinese: 成 may mean "turned into" while du Chinese: 都 can mean either a metropolis or a capital).

The present spelling is based on pinyin romanization; its Postal Map romanization was "Chengtu". Its former status as the seat of the Chengdu Prefecture prompted Marco Polo's spellings "Sindafu", "Sin-din-fu", and the Protestant missionaries' romanization "Ching-too Foo".

Although the city's official name has remained (almost) constant, the surrounding area has sometimes been known by other names, including "Yizhou". Chinese nicknames for the city include the "Turtle City", variously derived from the old city walls' shape on a map or a legend that Zhang Yi had planned their course by following a turtle's tracks; the "Brocade City" (see Sichuan brocade), a contraction of the earlier "City of the Brocade Official", after an imperial office established under the Western Han; the "Hibiscus City" (Rongcheng, 蓉城), from the hibiscus which King Meng Chang of the Later Shu ordered planted upon the city wall during the 10th century.

According to Étienne de la Vaissière, "Baghshūr" (lit. 'pond of salt water') may be the Sogdian name for the region of Chengdu. This toponym is attested near Merv, but not far from Chengdu are found the large saltwater wells of the Yangtze basin.

== Emblem ==
The city emblem, adopted in 2011, is inspired by the Golden Sun Bird, an ancient relic unearthed in 2001 from the Jinsha Site.

== History ==
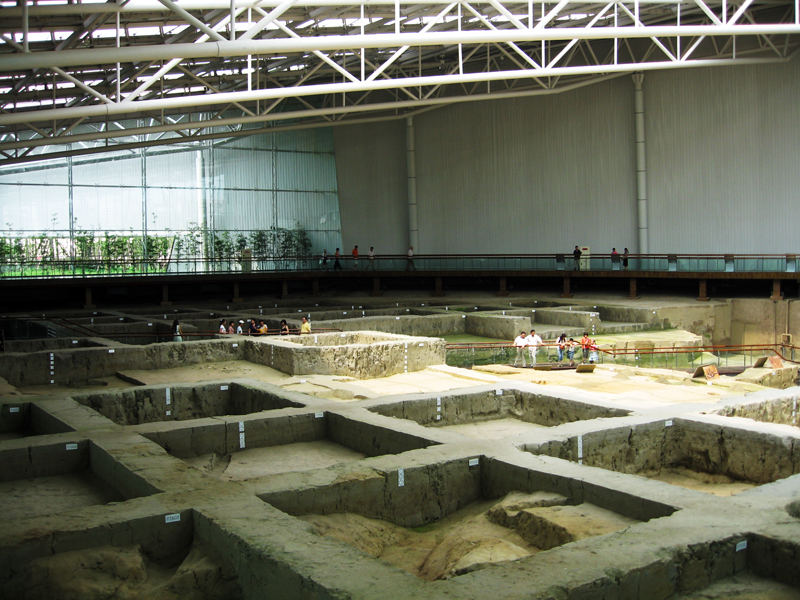
The archaeological site of Jinsha is a major discovery in Chengdu in 2001.

=== Early history ===
Archaeological discoveries at the Sanxingdui and Jinsha Site have established that the area surrounding Chengdu was inhabited over four thousand years ago, in the 18th–10th century BC. At the time of China's Xia, Shang, and Zhou dynasties, it represented a separate ancient bronze-wielding culture that, following its partial sinification, became known to the Chinese as Shu. Shu was conquered by Qin in 316 BC, and the settlement was re-founded by Qin general Zhang Yi.

==== Pre-Qin to Qin and Han dynasties ====
In the early stage of the Xia dynasty or even earlier, the ancient Shu Kingdom, located on the Chengdu Plain, had developed a relatively advanced bronze civilization, becoming an important source of Chinese civilization and one of the birthplaces of the Chinese nation. According to records, there were five dynasties in the ancient Shu Kingdom, and their capitals were Qushang (now Wenjiang District, Chengdu), Piyi (now Pidu District), Xindu, and Guangdu. At the end of the Spring and Autumn period (around the 4th century BC), the fifth King Kaiming moved the capital to Chengdu. According to "Taiping Huanyu Ji", the name of the city is borrowed from the history of the establishment of the capital in the Western Zhou dynasty. The allusion in Zhou Wang Qianqi's "one year, he lived in a cluster, two years became a city, and three years Chengdu" is to the name Chengdu; it has been used to this day. Therefore, Chengdu has become a rare city in China and the world that has not changed its name since its establishment. Some people think that Chengdu is a transliteration of ancient Shu place names. There is a saying that "Guangdu, Xindu, and Chengdu" are collectively referred to as the "Three Capitals of Ancient Shu". Nowadays, many cultural relics of the ancient Shu Kingdom are located on the Chengdu Plain, including Sanxingdui Ruins, Jinsha Ruins, Yufu Ancient City Ruins, and Wangcong Temple. Jinsha Ruins, located in Chengdu's urban area, is a pinnacle of ancient Shu culture.

The Golden Mask of the Shang and Zhou dynasties at the Jinsha Site.

The ancient state of Shu was the first target to be conquered by the Qin state in the process of unifying the world. King Huiwen of Qin had prepared for this for many years and opened the Shiniu Road (i.e., the Jinniu Road) from Qin to Shu. In 316 BC, King Huiwen of Qin took advantage of the mutual attack between Ba and Shu and sent Sima Cuo to lead his army into Shu along the Shiniu Road, capturing the land in a few months. After that, the king of Qin abolished the three Shu Hou and finally established Shu County, with the county seat in Chengdu, the former capital of Shu. In 311 BC, Zhang Yi of the Qin dynasty built the Chengdu city wall according to the system of the capital Xianyang, building a large city and a small city. In 256 BC, King Zhao of Qin appointed Li Bing as the governor of Shu County. During his tenure, he presided over the construction of the world-famous Dujiangyan Water Conservancy Project. The Chengdu Plain has been fertile and wild for thousands of miles since then. After decades of operation, Chengdu replaced Guanzhong Plain in the late Qin dynasty and was called the "Land of Abundance"; this reputation has endured to this day.

During the Han dynasty, the Chengdu economy, especially its brocade industry, prospered, becoming an important source of tribute to the court. The imperial court invested in Chengdu and specifically set up the Jinguan management and built "Jinguan City" in the southwest of Chengdu; "Jinguan City" and "Jincheng" became nicknames for Chengdu. In the second year of Emperor Ping of the Yuan dynasty, Chengdu's population reached 76,000 households, or about 354,000 people, making it one of the most populous cities at the time. Towards the six major cities. In the third year of the reign of Emperor Jing of the Han dynasty (141 BC), the Wen Dang, the prefect of Shu County, established the world's earliest local government-run school, "Wenweng Shishi", in Chengdu. In the Han dynasty, Chengdu's literature and art also reached a high level. All the most famous literary masters in the Han dynasty were from Chengdu, including Sima Xiangru, Yang Xiong, and Wang Bao.

In the former Han dynasty, the whole country was divided into 14 prefectural governors' departments, among which the Yizhou governor was established in Luoxian (now Guanghan City, Sichuan), and the governor later moved to Chengdu. In the first year of Emperor Guangwu's reign (25 years) in the Eastern Han dynasty, Gongsun Shu established himself as the emperor in Chengdu, and the country's name was "married family". In the twelfth year of Jianwu in the Later Han dynasty (36 years), the Great Sima Wuhan of the Eastern Han dynasty finally captured Chengdu after five years of war, and his family perished in the process. In the fifth year of Zhongping (188), Emperor Ling of Han, the court accepted Liu Yan's suggestion and changed the provincial governors to state shepherds with actual recruitment and command power. In the fifth year of Chuping (194), it moved to Chengdu. At that time, the Yizhou Provincial Governor's Department was the place where the Hu people in the Western Regions were operating.

=== Imperial era ===
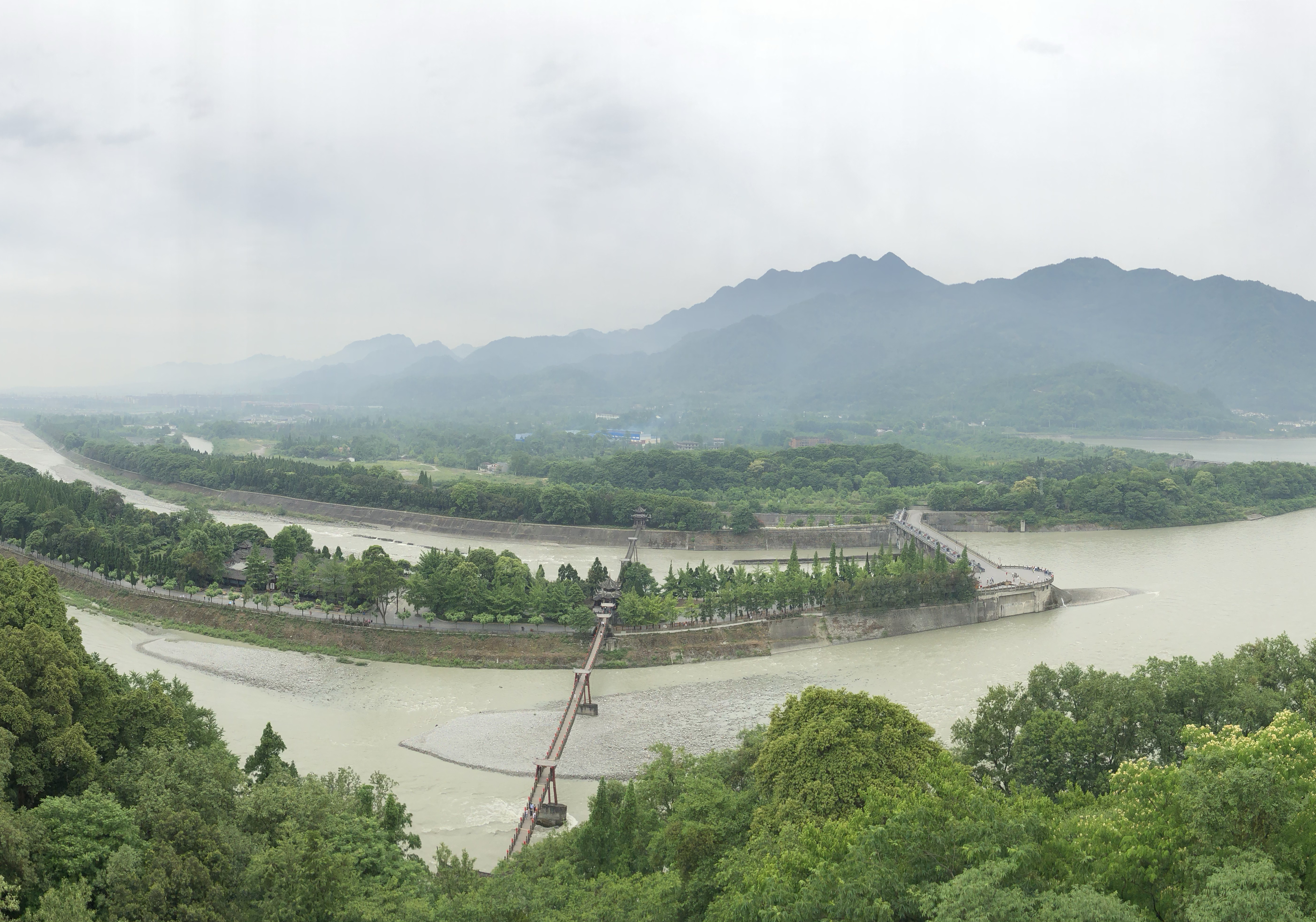
The Dujiangyan Irrigation System built in 256 BC still functions today.

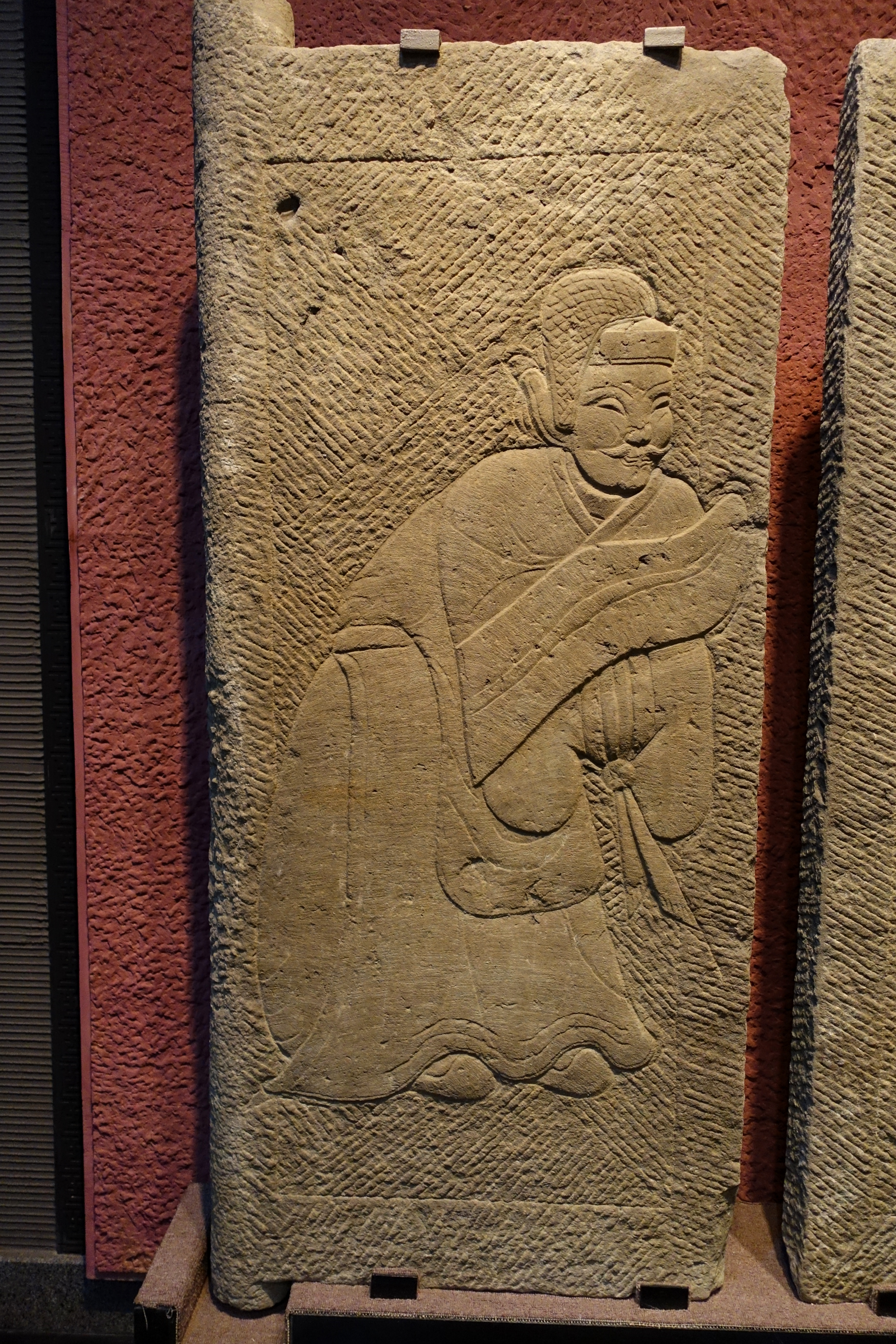
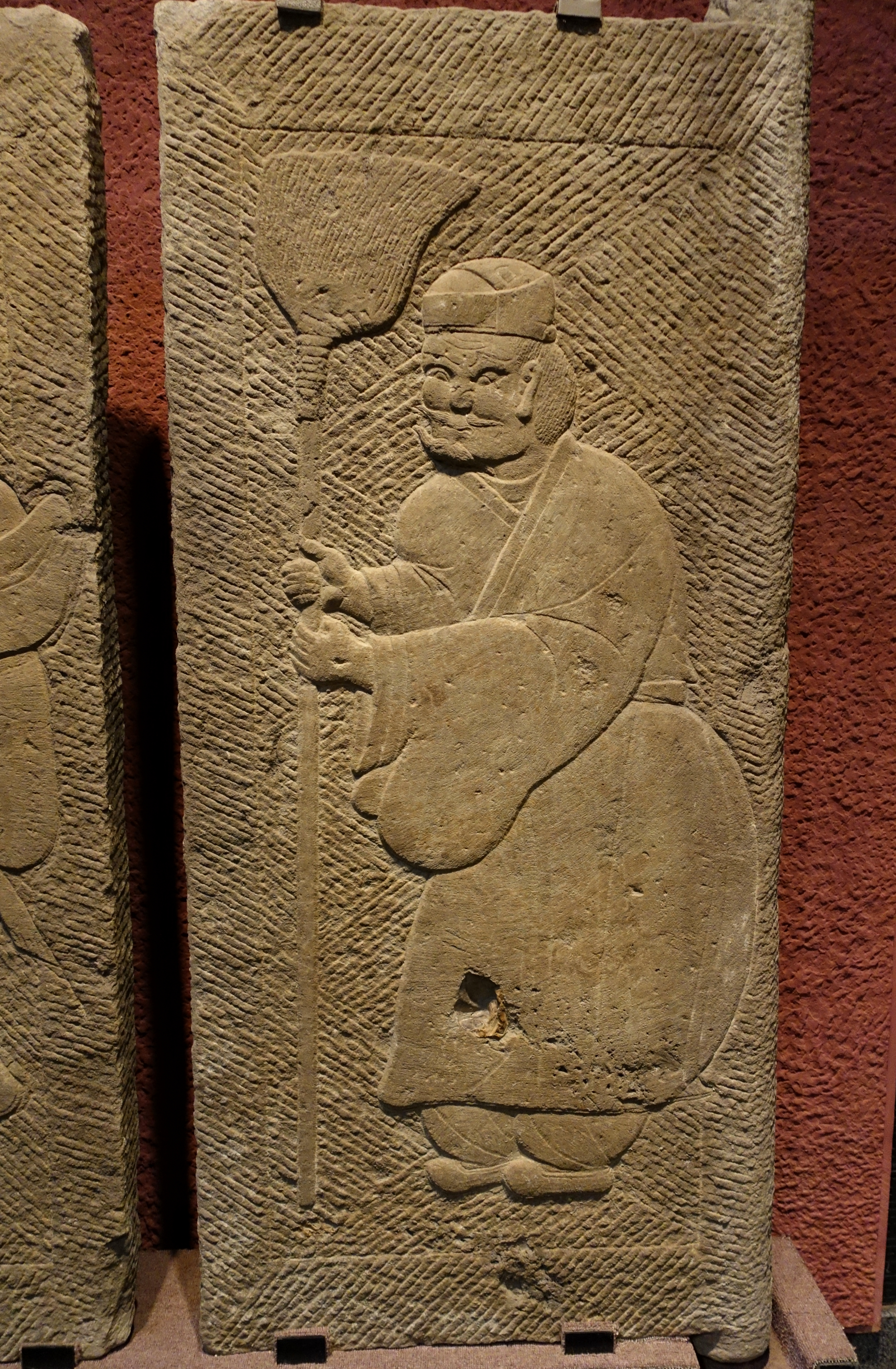
Tomb doors from Pi County showing men in hanfu, one with a shield and the other a broom (1st or 2nd century).

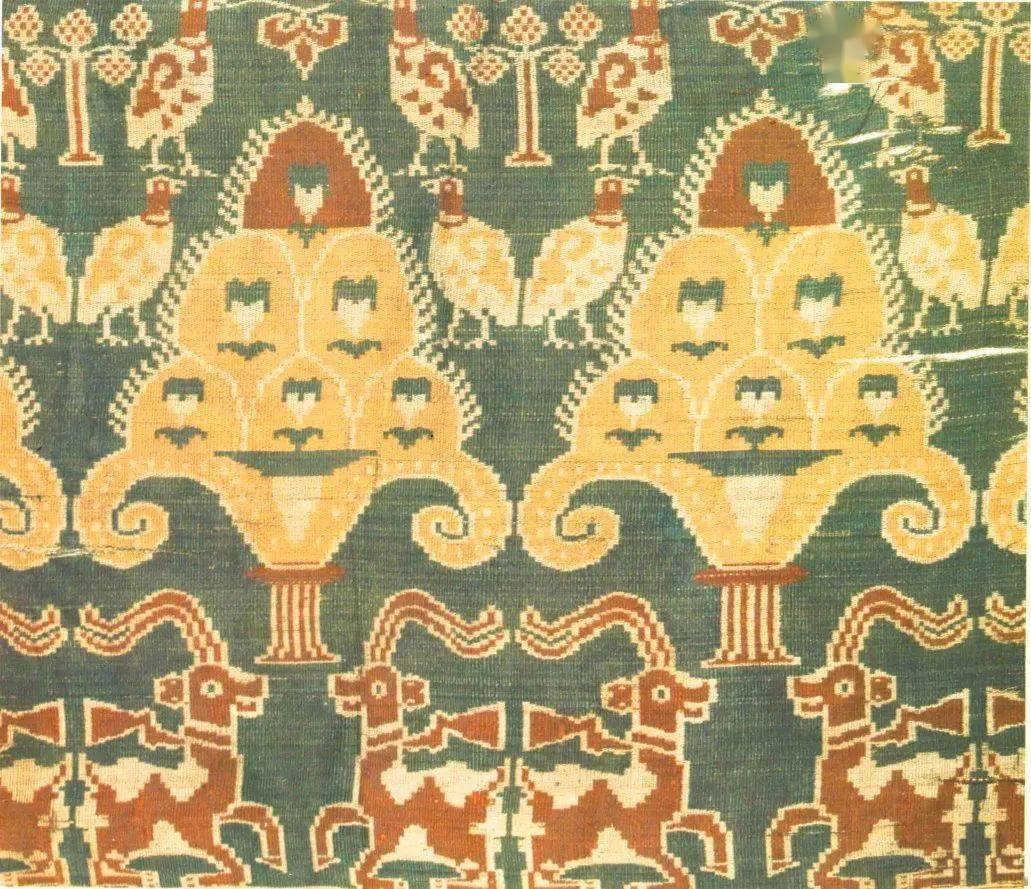
Sixth-century Sichuan brocade

Under the Han, the brocade produced in Chengdu became fashionable and was exported throughout China. A "Brocade Official" (錦官; jǐnguān) was established to oversee its production and transaction. After the fall of the Eastern Han, Liu Bei ruled Shu Han, the southwestern part of the Three Kingdoms, from Chengdu. His minister Zhuge Liang called the area the "Land of Abundance". Under the Tang, Chengdu was considered the second most prosperous city in China after Yangzhou. (Note: traditional Chinese: 揚一益二; simplified Chinese: 扬一益二; lit. 'Yang[zhou] 1[st]', 'Yi[zhou] 2[nd]') Both Li Bai and Du Fu lived in the city. Li Bai praised it as "lying above the empyrean." The city's present Caotang ("Grass Hall") was constructed in 1078 in honor of an earlier, more humble structure of that name erected by Du Fu in 760, the second year of his 4-year stay. The Taoist Qingyang Gong ("Green Goat Temple") was built in the 9th century.

Chengdu was the capital of Wang Jian's Former Shu from 907 to 925, when it was conquered by the Later Tang. The Later Shu was founded by Meng Zhixiang in 934, with its capital at Chengdu. Its second and last king, Meng Chang, beautified the city by ordering hibiscus to be planted upon the city walls.

The Song conquered the city in 965, introducing the first widely used paper money in the world. Su Shi praised it as "the southwestern metropolis". At the fall of the Song, a rebel leader set up a short-lived kingdom known as Great Shu (Chinese: 大蜀, Dàshǔ). Allegedly, the Mongols called for the death of a million people in the city, but the city's population had fewer than 30,000 residents (not Chengdu prefecture). The aged males who had not fled were killed, while in typical fashion, the women, children, and artisans were enslaved and deported. During the Yuan dynasty, most of Sichuan's residents were deported to Hunan due to the insurgency by western ethnic tribes in western Sichuan. Marco Polo visited Chengdu and wrote about the Anshun Bridge or an earlier version of it. (Note: "Let us now speak of a great Bridge which crosses this River within the city. This bridge is of stone; it is seven paces in width and half a mile in length (the river being that much in width as I told you); and all along its length on either side there are columns of marble to bear the roof, for the bridge is roofed over from end to end with timber, and that all richly painted. And on this bridge there were houses in which a great deal of trade and industry is carried on. But these houses were all of wood merely, and they are put up in the morning and taken down in the evening. Also there stands upon the bridge the Great Kaan's _Comercque_, that is to say, his custom-house, where his toll and tax were levied.")

At the fall of the Ming, the rebel Zhang Xianzhong established his Great Western Kingdom (Chinese: 大西) with its capital at Chengdu; it lasted only from 1643 to 1646. Zhang was said to have massacred a large number of people in Chengdu and throughout Sichuan. In any case, Chengdu was said to have become a virtual ghost town frequented by tigers and the depopulation of Sichuan necessitated the resettlement of millions of people from other provinces during the Qing dynasty. Following the Columbian Exchange, the Chengdu Plain became one of China's principal sources of tobacco. Pi County was considered to have the highest quality in Sichuan, which was the center of the country's cigar and cigarette production, the rest of the country long continuing to consume snuff instead.

=== Modern era ===
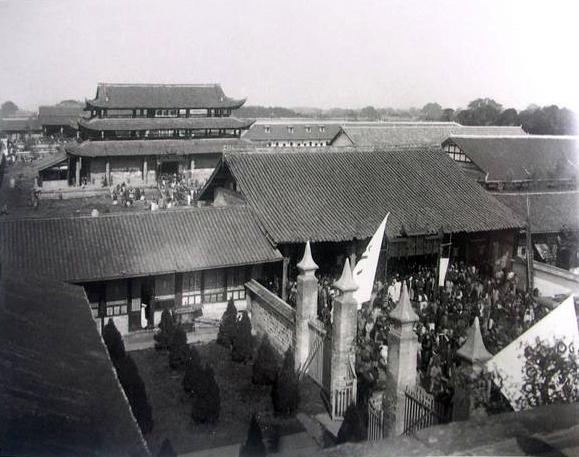
Huangchengba in 1911

In 1911, Chengdu's branch of the Railway Protection Movement helped trigger the Wuchang Uprising, which led to the Xinhai Revolution that overthrew the Qing dynasty.

During World War II, the capital city of China was forced to move inland from Nanjing to Wuhan in 1937 and from Wuhan to Chengdu, then from Chengdu to Chongqing in 1938, as the Kuomintang (KMT) government under Generalissimo Chiang Kai-shek ultimately retreated to Sichuan to escape from the invading Japanese forces. They brought with them to Sichuan businesspeople, workers, and academics who founded many of the industries and cultural institutions that continue to make Chengdu an important cultural and commercial production center.

Chengdu became a military center for the KMT to regroup in the War of Resistance. Chengdu was beyond the reach of the Imperial Japanese ground forces and escort fighter planes. However, the Japanese frequently flew in the then-highly advanced twin-engine long-ranged G3M "Nell" medium bombers to conduct massive aerial bombardments of both civilian and military targets in Chongqing and Chengdu. The massed formation of the G3M bombers provided heavy firepower against Chinese fighter planes assigned to the defense of Chongqing and Chengdu, which continued to cause problems for the Japanese attacks.

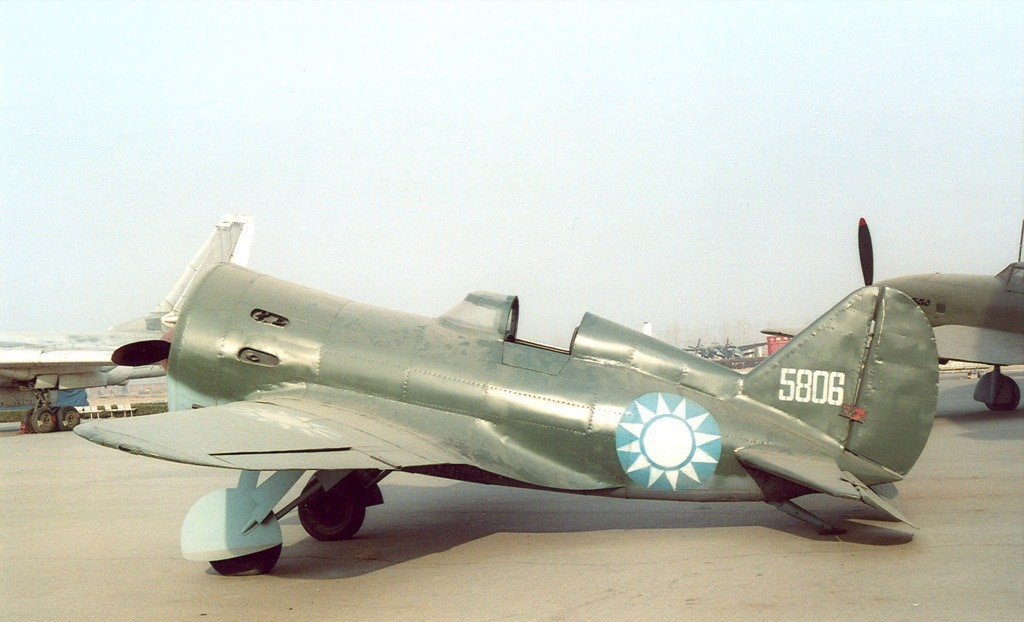
An all-air war was fought over Chengdu between the Chinese Air Force and the Imperial Japanese Army and Navy air forces; an I-16 fighter shown here at the Datangshan Aviation Museum

Slow and vulnerable obsolescent Chinese fighter aircraft burning low-grade fuel were still sufficiently dangerous in the hands of capable pilots against the Japanese schnellbomber-terror bombing raiders; on 4 November 1939, for instance, Capt. Cen Zeliu (Wade-Giles: Shen Tse-Liu) led his 17th Fighter Squadron, 5th Fighter Group of seven cannon-equipped Dewoitine D.510 fighters in a level head-on attack against an incoming coming raid of 72 IJANF G3M bombers (Capt. Cen chose this tactic knowing that the operation of the Hispano-Suiza HS.404 20mm autocannon in his D.510 is likely to fail under the g-loads of a high-deflection diving attack), with Capt. Cen pummeling the lead G3M of the IJN's 13th Kōkūtai's CO Captain Kikushi Okuda with cannon fire, sending the G3M crashing down in flames over Chengdu, along with three other G3M bombers destroyed in the Chengdu raid that day. With the death of Captain Okuda in the air battle over Chengdu, the IJN Kaigun-daisa (海軍大佐) became the highest-ranking IJN Air officer to be killed-in-action in the War of Resistance/World War II thus far.

In mid- to late-1940, unknown to the Americans and European allies, the Imperial Japanese appeared in the skies over Chongqing and Chengdu with the world's most advanced fighter plane at the time: the A6M "Zero" fighter that dominated the skies over China against the increasingly obsolete Russian-made Polikarpov I-15/I-153s and I-16s that were the principal fighter planes of the Chinese Nationalist Air Force. This would later prove to be a rude awakening for the Allied forces in the Pacific War following the attack on Pearl Harbor. One of the first American ace fighter pilots of the war and original volunteer fighter pilot for the Chinese Nationalist Air Force, Major Huang Xinrui (nicknamed "Buffalo" by his comrades) died as a result of battling the Zero fighters along with his squadronmates Cen Zeliu and Lin Heng (younger brother of renowned architect Lin Huiyin) defending Chengdu on 14 March 1941.

Following the attack on Pearl Harbor at the end of 1941, the United States began setting up stations at airbases in China. In 1944, the American XX Bomber Command launched Operation Matterhorn, an ambitious plan to base B-29 Superfortresses in Chengdu and strategically bomb the Japanese Home Islands. The operating base was located in Xinjin Airport in the southwestern part of the Chengdu metropolitan area. Because the operation required a massive airlift of fuel and supplies over the Himalayas, it was not a significant military success, but it did earn Chengdu the distinction of launching the first serious retaliation against the Japanese homeland.

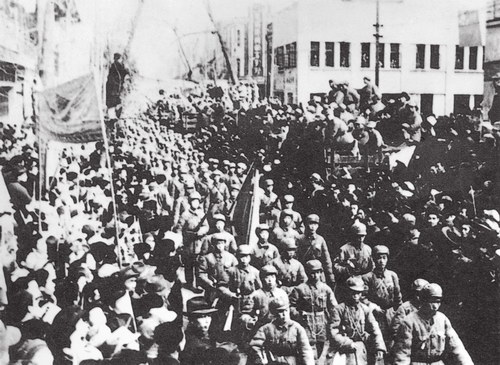
People's Liberation Army troops entered Chengdu on 27 December 1949

During the Chinese Civil War, Chengdu was the last major city on the mainland China to be held by the Kuomintang. President Chiang Kai-shek and his son Chiang Ching-kuo directed the defense of the city from the Chengdu Central Military Academy (黄埔军校成都分校) until 1949, when Communist forces took the city on 27 December. The People's Liberation Army took the city without any resistance after a deal was negotiated between the People's Liberation Army and the commander of the KMT Army guarding the city. On 10 December the remnants of the Nationalist Chinese government evacuated to Taiwan.

The Chengdu Tianfu New Area is a sustainable planned city that will be outside of Central Chengdu. The city is also planned to be self-sustaining, with every residence being a two-minute walk from a park.

==== The Great City ====
In 2019, Chengdu overtook Shenzhen, China's technology hub, as the best-performing Chinese economy. The city has surged in population in the last two decades. Investments into the Europe-Chengdu Express Railway have been made, providing even more opportunities for the city to grow. As a way to preserve farmland and accommodate the growing population of Chengdu, China is building a hyper-dense satellite city centered around a central mass-transit hub called the Great City, where any destination within the city is within a 15-minute walk. This proto-type city is intended to provide affordable, high-quality lifestyle, which provides people-oriented spaces that does not require a car to navigate.

Their current urban-planning focus in the city of Chengdu is to make the city 'a city within a park' rather than creating parks within a city. The Great City falls in line with the Chengdu 'park city' initiative, prioritizing the environment, public space, and quality of life. It will consist of 15% park and green space and be situated on a 1.3 km^{2} (0.50 sq mi) area. Although 25% of the space will be dedicated to roads, one half of the roads will be pedestrian-oriented. This transit system provides direct service to Chengdu. It is expected that the city will consume 48% less energy than cities of similar size.

The goal of the 'park city' project is to enable a city like Chengdu to compete with Beijing and Shanghai without stripping it of its character. The city of Chengdu is already known for its focus on quality of life, which includes affordable housing, good public schools, trees, and bike lanes.

== Geography ==
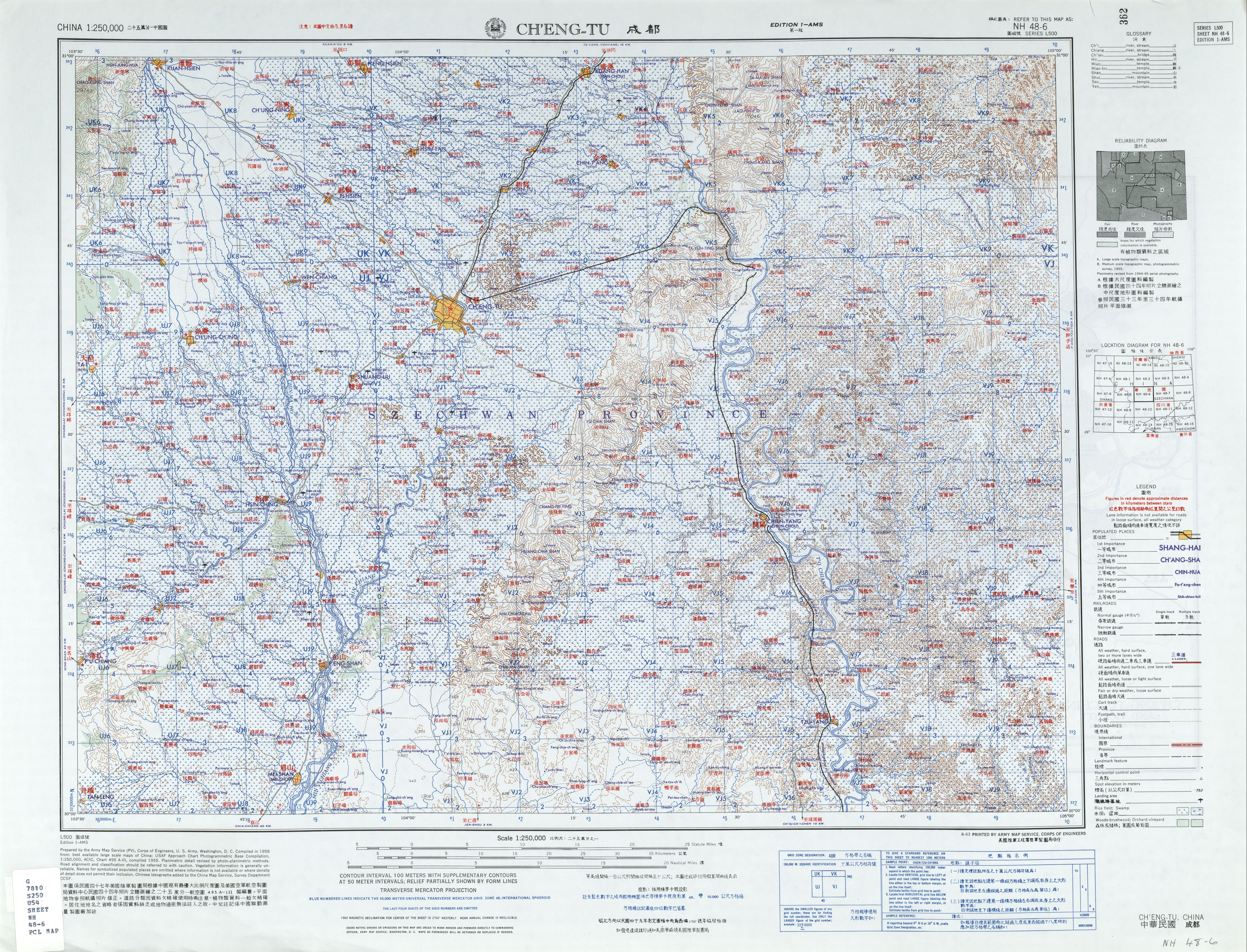
Map including Chengdu (labeled as CH'ENG-TU (walled) Chinese: 成都) (AMS, 1958)

The vast plain on which Chengdu is located has an elevation ranging from 450 to 720 meters (1,480 to 2,360 feet).

Northwest Chengdu is bordered by the high and steep Longmen Mountains in the north-west and in the west by the Qionglai Mountains, the elevation of which exceeds 3,000 m (9,800 ft) and includes Miao Jiling (5,364 m, 17,598 ft) and Xiling Snow Mountain (5,164 m, 16,942 ft). The western mountainous area is also home to a large primitive forest with abundant biological resources and a giant panda habitat. East of Chengdu stands the low Longquan Mountains and the west bordering area of the hilly land of the middle reaches of Min River, an area noted by several converging rivers. Since ancient times, Chengdu has been known as "the Abundant Land" owing to its fertile soil, favorable climate, and novel Dujiangyan Irrigation System.

Chengdu is located at the western edge of the Sichuan Basin and sits on the Chengdu Plain; the dominating terrain is plains. The prefecture ranges in latitude from 30° 05' to 31° 26' N, while its longitude ranges from 102° 54' to 104° 53' E, stretching for 192 kilometers (119 mi) from east to west and 166 km (103 mi) south to north, administering 12,390 km^{2} (4,780 sq mi) of land. Neighboring prefectures are Deyang (NE), Ziyang (SE), Meishan (S), Ya'an (SW), and the Ngawa Tibetan and Qiang Autonomous Prefecture (N). The urban area, with an elevation of 500 m (1,600 ft), features a few rivers, three of them being the Jin, Fu, and Sha Rivers. Outside of the immediate urban area, the topography becomes more complex: to the east lies the Longquan Mountains (龙泉山脉) and the Penzhong Hills (Chinese: 盆中丘陵); to the west lie the Qionglai Mountains, which rise to 5,364 m (17,598 ft) in Dayi County. The highest point in Chengdu is Daxuetang (also known as Miaojiling) in Xiling Snow Mountain, Dayi County, at an altitude of 5,364 meters. The lowest point is the riverbank at the exit of the Tuojiang River in Jianyang City, with an altitude of 359 meters.

=== Climate ===
Chengdu has a monsoon-influenced humid subtropical climate (Köppen Cwa) and is largely warm, with high relative humidity year-round. It has four distinct seasons, with moderate rainfall concentrated mainly in the warmer months, relieving both sweltering summers and freezing winters. The Qin Mountains (Qinling) to the far north help shield the city from cold Siberian winds in the winter; because of this, the short winter is milder than in the Lower Yangtze. The daily mean temperature in January is 5.9 °C (42.6 °F), and snow is rare, though there are a few periods of frost each winter. The summer is hot and humid, but not to the extent of the "Three Furnaces" cities of Chongqing, Wuhan, and Nanjing, all of which lie in the Yangtze basin. The 24-hour daily mean temperature in July and August is around 25 °C (77 °F), with afternoon highs sometimes reaching 33 °C (91 °F); sustained heat as found in much of eastern China is rare. Rainfall occurs most frequently in July and August, with very little in the cooler months. Chengdu also has one of the lowest annual sunshine totals nationally, with less sunshine annually than much of Northern Europe. With monthly percent possible sunshine ranging from 15 percent in December to 32 percent in August, the city receives 1006 hours of bright sunshine annually. Spring (March–April) tends to be sunnier and warmer in the day than autumn (October–November). The annual mean is 16.9 °C (62.4 °F), and extremes have ranged from −6.5 °C (20 °F) to 39.4 °C (102.9 °F).

Climate data for Chengdu (Shuangliu District), elevation 495 m (1,624 ft), (1991–2020 normals, extremes 1951–present)
Month	Jan	Feb	Mar	Apr	May	Jun	Jul	Aug	Sep	Oct	Nov	Dec	Year
Record high °C (°F)	20.1 (68.2)	25.5 (77.9)	31.8 (89.2)	35.1 (95.2)	37.3 (99.1)	37.5 (99.5)	39.6 (103.3)	40.2 (104.4)	37.4 (99.3)	31.9 (89.4)	26.2 (79.2)	21.3 (70.3)	40.2 (104.4)
Mean daily maximum °C (°F)	9.8 (49.6)	12.7 (54.9)	17.5 (63.5)	23.3 (73.9)	27.0 (80.6)	28.9 (84.0)	30.6 (87.1)	30.6 (87.1)	26.2 (79.2)	21.3 (70.3)	16.7 (62.1)	11.2 (52.2)	21.3 (70.4)
Daily mean °C (°F)	6.0 (42.8)	8.5 (47.3)	12.6 (54.7)	17.6 (63.7)	21.6 (70.9)	24.2 (75.6)	25.8 (78.4)	25.5 (77.9)	21.9 (71.4)	17.5 (63.5)	12.8 (55.0)	7.5 (45.5)	16.8 (62.2)
Mean daily minimum °C (°F)	3.3 (37.9)	5.5 (41.9)	9.0 (48.2)	13.6 (56.5)	17.6 (63.7)	20.8 (69.4)	22.5 (72.5)	22.1 (71.8)	19.2 (66.6)	15.1 (59.2)	10.2 (50.4)	4.9 (40.8)	13.7 (56.6)
Record low °C (°F)	−6.5 (20.3)	−2.6 (27.3)	−1.8 (28.8)	4.0 (39.2)	6.3 (43.3)	14.2 (57.6)	16.6 (61.9)	16.0 (60.8)	12.2 (54.0)	3.1 (37.6)	0.2 (32.4)	−5.9 (21.4)	−6.5 (20.3)
Average precipitation mm (inches)	8.9 (0.35)	12.4 (0.49)	23.6 (0.93)	47.5 (1.87)	76.8 (3.02)	122.5 (4.82)	238.2 (9.38)	198.8 (7.83)	116.5 (4.59)	43.1 (1.70)	15.9 (0.63)	7.0 (0.28)	911.2 (35.89)
Average precipitation days (≥ 0.1 mm)	7.6	8.0	10.5	13.5	13.8	15.7	17.3	15.7	15.1	14.7	7.5	6.6	146
Average snowy days	1.1	0.4	0	0	0	0	0	0	0	0	0	0.2	1.7
Average relative humidity (%)	82	79	77	76	73	78	83	83	84	83	82	82	80
Mean monthly sunshine hours	38.3	54.7	85.2	116.0	122.1	110.7	122.1	132.9	70.5	54.9	47.7	37.7	992.8
Percentage possible sunshine	12	17	23	30	29	26	29	33	19	16	15	12	22
Source: China Meteorological Administration all-time extreme temperature all-time January high all-time July High

Climate data for Chengdu (Wenjiang District), elevation 548 m (1,798 ft), (1991–2020 normals, extremes 1981–present)
Month	Jan	Feb	Mar	Apr	May	Jun	Jul	Aug	Sep	Oct	Nov	Dec	Year
Record high °C (°F)	19.5 (67.1)	23.7 (74.7)	30.9 (87.6)	33.8 (92.8)	35.7 (96.3)	36.0 (96.8)	38.9 (102.0)	39.4 (102.9)	36.8 (98.2)	30.8 (87.4)	24.9 (76.8)	19.5 (67.1)	39.4 (102.9)
Mean daily maximum °C (°F)	9.3 (48.7)	12.1 (53.8)	16.8 (62.2)	22.5 (72.5)	26.3 (79.3)	28.3 (82.9)	30.0 (86.0)	29.9 (85.8)	25.7 (78.3)	20.7 (69.3)	16.0 (60.8)	10.7 (51.3)	20.7 (69.2)
Daily mean °C (°F)	5.5 (41.9)	8.0 (46.4)	12.0 (53.6)	17.1 (62.8)	21.1 (70.0)	23.8 (74.8)	25.4 (77.7)	25.0 (77.0)	21.6 (70.9)	17.0 (62.6)	12.2 (54.0)	6.9 (44.4)	16.3 (61.3)
Mean daily minimum °C (°F)	2.7 (36.9)	4.9 (40.8)	8.4 (47.1)	12.9 (55.2)	17.2 (63.0)	20.5 (68.9)	22.1 (71.8)	21.7 (71.1)	18.9 (66.0)	14.7 (58.5)	9.6 (49.3)	4.2 (39.6)	13.1 (55.7)
Record low °C (°F)	−6.5 (20.3)	−3.5 (25.7)	−2.0 (28.4)	3.7 (38.7)	5.9 (42.6)	14.1 (57.4)	16.2 (61.2)	16.2 (61.2)	11.1 (52.0)	2.5 (36.5)	−0.1 (31.8)	−4.2 (24.4)	−6.5 (20.3)
Average precipitation mm (inches)	8.1 (0.32)	11.4 (0.45)	24.1 (0.95)	44.9 (1.77)	78.0 (3.07)	109.5 (4.31)	231.8 (9.13)	217.1 (8.55)	120.8 (4.76)	42.6 (1.68)	14.8 (0.58)	6.2 (0.24)	909.3 (35.81)
Average precipitation days (≥ 0.1 mm)	7.1	7.9	11.4	13.2	14.2	15.1	16.1	15.3	15.8	13.9	7.8	6.2	144
Average snowy days	1.6	0.4	0	0	0	0	0	0	0	0	0	0.2	2.2
Average relative humidity (%)	81	79	77	76	74	79	84	84	84	84	82	82	81
Mean monthly sunshine hours	45.4	52.3	79.3	106.3	111.4	103.6	119.9	128.1	63.3	49.6	53.0	50.5	962.7
Percentage possible sunshine	14	16	21	27	26	25	28	32	17	14	17	16	21
Source: China Meteorological Administration all-time extreme temperature NOAA all-time January high all-time July High

== Administrative divisions ==
Chengdu is a sub-provincial city, serving as the capital of Sichuan. It has direct jurisdiction over 12 districts, 5 county-level cities and 3 counties:

Administrative divisions of Chengdu
Districts: 1: Jinjiang; 2: Qingyang; 3: Wuhou; 4: Chenghua; 5: Qingbaijiang
Division code	Division	Area in km^{2}	Population 2020	Seat	Postal code	Subdivisions				
Division code	Division	Area in km^{2}	Population 2020	Seat	Postal code	Subdistricts	Towns	Townships	Residential communities	Administrative villages
510100	Chengdu	14,378.18	20,937,757	Wuhou	610000	112	205	55	1549	2735
510104	Jinjiang	60.24	902,933	Chenglong Road Subdistrict	610000	16			117	
510105	Qingyang	65.89	955,954	Xinhua West Road Subdistrict	610000	14			76	
510106	Jinniu	107.03	1,265,398	Fuqin Subdistrict	610000	15			109	
510107	Wuhou	123.44	1,855,186	Jiangxi Street Subdistrict	610000	17			113	
510108	Chenghua	109.28	1,381,894	Mengzhuiwan Subdistrict	610000	14			101	
510112	Longquanyi	558.74	1,346,210	Longquan Subdistrict	610100	4	7(5)	1	65	76
510113	Qingbaijiang	392.41	490,091	Hongyang Subdistrict	610300	2	8(4)	1	27	94
510114	Xindu	480.65	1,558,466	Xindu Subdistrict	610500	3	10(10)		128	127
510115	Wenjiang	276.91	967,868	Liucheng Subdistrict	611100	4	6(3)		79	35
510116	Shuangliu	1,067.83	2,659,829	Dongsheng Subdistrict	610200	7	18		153	116
510117	Pidu	437.45	1,672,025	Pitong Subdistrict	611700	3	13		60	139
510132	Xinjin	329.93	363,591	Wujin Subdistrict	611400	1	10	1	26	80
Urban District		3679.87	15,419,445							
510121	Jintang County	1,155.60	800,371	Zhaozhen Subdistrict	610400	1	18	2	47	185
510129	Dayi County	1,318.80	515,962	Jinyuan Subdistrict	611300	1	16	3	66	152
510131	Pujiang County	579.17	255,563	Heshan Subdistrict	611600	1	7	4	25	107
510181	Dujiangyan	1,207.98	710,056	Guankou Subdistrict	611800	5	13	1	69	197
510182	Pengzhou	1,419.38	780,399	Tianpeng Town	611900	1	19		102	251
510183	Qionglai	1,384.44	602,973	Linqiong Subdistrict	611500	1	17	6	62	202
510184	Chongzhou	1,088.01	735,723	Chongyang Subdistrict	611200	1	18	6	65	188
510185	Jianyang	2,215.02	1,117,265	Jiancheng Subdistrict	611400	4	25	29	49	796

Divisions in Chinese and varieties of romanizations
English	Chinese	Hanyu Pinyin	Sichuanese Pinyin
Chengdu City	成都市	Chéngdū Shì	cen^{2} du^{1} si^{4}
Jinjiang District	锦江区	Jǐnjiāng Qū	jin^{3} jiang^{1} qu^{1}
Qingyang District	青羊区	Qīngyáng Qū	qin^{1} yang^{2} qu^{1}
Jinniu District	金牛区	Jīnniú Qū	jin^{1} ȵiu^{2} qu^{1}
Wuhou District	武侯区	Wǔhóu Qū	wu^{3} hou^{2} qu^{1}
Chenghua District	成华区	Chénghuá Qū	cen^{2} hua^{2} qu^{1}
Longquanyi District	龙泉驿区	Lóngquányì Qū	nong^{2} quan^{2} yi^{2} qu^{1}
Qingbaijiang District	青白江区	Qīngbáijiāng Qū	qin^{1} be^{2} jiang^{1} qu^{1}
Xindu District	新都区	Xīndū Qū	xin^{1} du^{1} qu^{1}
Wenjiang District	温江区	Wēnjiāng Qū	wen^{1} jiang^{1} qu^{1}
Shuangliu District	双流区	Shuāngliú Qū	suang^{1} niu^{2} qu^{1}
Pidu District	郫都区	Pídū Qū	pi^{2} du^{1} qu^{1}
Xinjin District	新津区	Xīnjīn Qū	xin^{1} jin^{1} qu^{1}
Jintang County	金堂县	Jīntáng Xiàn	jin^{1} tang^{2} xian^{3}
Dayi County	大邑县	Dàyì Xiàn	da^{4} yi^{2} xian^{3}
Pujiang County	蒲江县	Pújiāng Xiàn	pu2^{4} jiang^{1} xian^{3}
Jianyang	Chinese: 简阳市	Jiǎnyáng Shì	jian^{3} yang^{2} si^{4}
Dujiangyan	Chinese: 都江堰市	Dūjiāngyàn Shì	du^{1} jiang^{1} yan^{4} si^{4}
Pengzhou	Chinese: 彭州市	Péngzhōu Shì	pen^{2} zou^{1} si^{4}
Qionglai	邛崃市	Qiónglái Shì	qiong^{2} lai^{2} si^{4}
Chongzhou	Chinese: 崇州市	Chóngzhōu Shì	cong^{2} zou^{1} si^{4}

- Tianfu New Area
- Chengdu Economic and Technological Development Zone
- Chengdu Hi-tech Industrial Development Zone
  - Chengdu Tianfu Software Park
  - Chengdu Export Processing Zone

== Cityscape ==
1989 CIA Map of Chengdu showing infrastructures and land use

In 1988, the Implementation Plan for a Gradual Housing System Reform in Cities and Towns marked the beginning of overall housing reform in China's urban areas. More than 20 real estate companies set up in Chengdu, which was the first step for Chengdu's real estate development.

The comprehensive Funan River renovation project in the 1990s was another step towards promoting Chengdu's environmental development. The Funan River Comprehensive Improvement Project won the UN-Habitat Scroll of Honour Award in 1998, as well as winning the "Local Initiative Award" by the International Council for Local Environmental Initiatives in 2000.

Construction of the Five Main Roads & One Bridge project began in 1997. Three roads served the eastern part of the city; the other two led south. It established the foundation of the Eastern and Southern sub-centers of Chengdu. The two major sub-centers determined people's eastward and southward living trends. Large numbers of buildings appeared around the east and south of the 2nd Ring Road. The Shahe River renovation project, along with the Jin River project, also sparked a trend among residents living along both rivers. It was said that the map of Chengdu should be updated every three months.

A speculative housing boom occurred in the late 1990s and early 2000s. In 2000, dozens of commercial real estate projects also appeared. While promoting the real estate market, the Chinese government encouraged citizens to buy their own houses by providing considerable subsidies for a certain period. Houses were included in commodities.

As of February 2026, the world's third-largest building by floor area, the New Century Global Center, is located in the city. The 100-meter-tall (330 ft) structure is 500 by 400 meters (1,600 by 1,300 ft) in size with 1,700,000 square meters (18,000,000 sq ft) of floor area, housing retail outlets, a movie theaters, offices, hotels, a water park with artificial beach and waves and a Mediterranean-style village comprising a large 5-star hotel, a skating rink and a 15,000-spot parking area.

Gallery

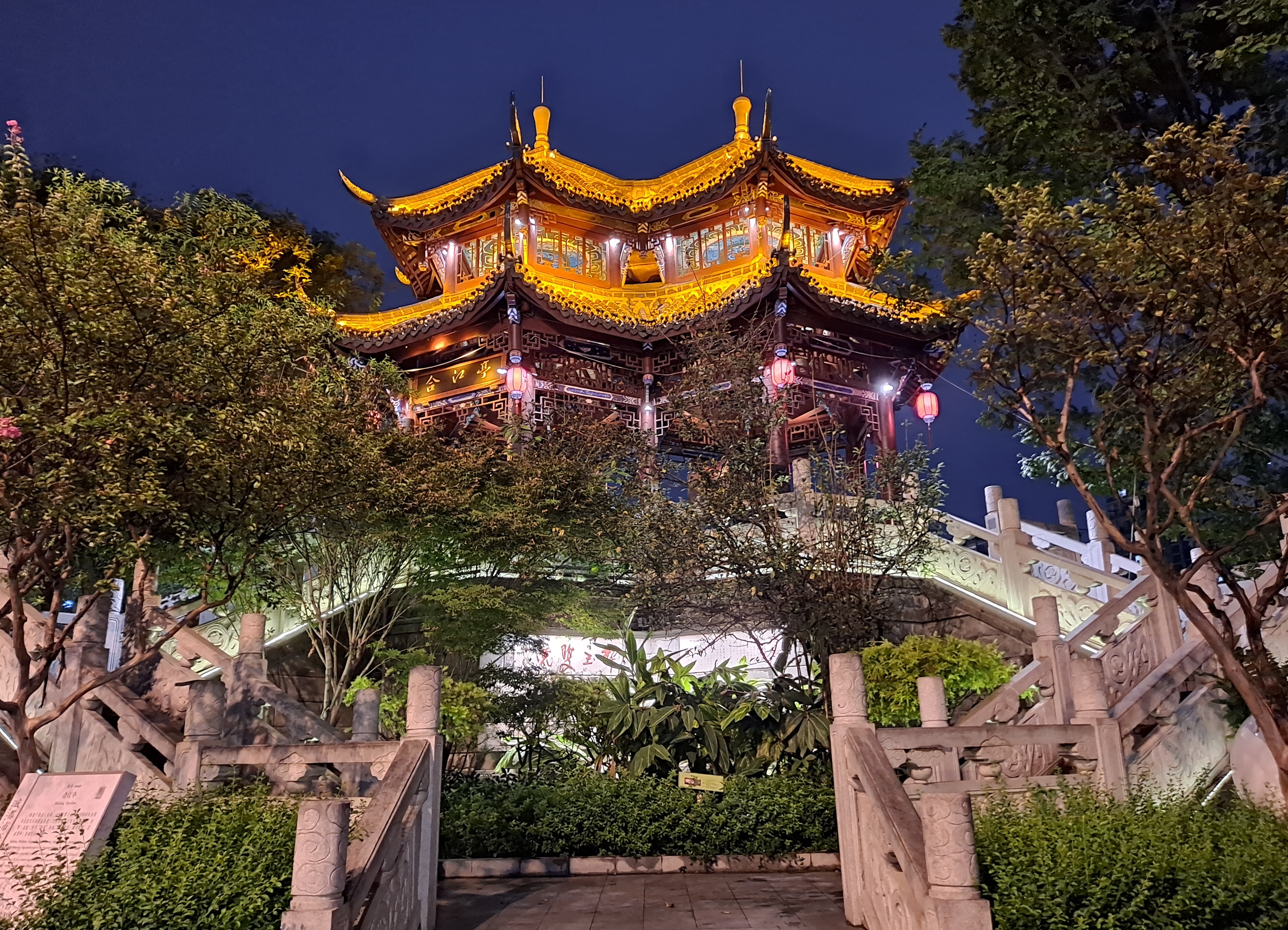
Hejiang Pavilion

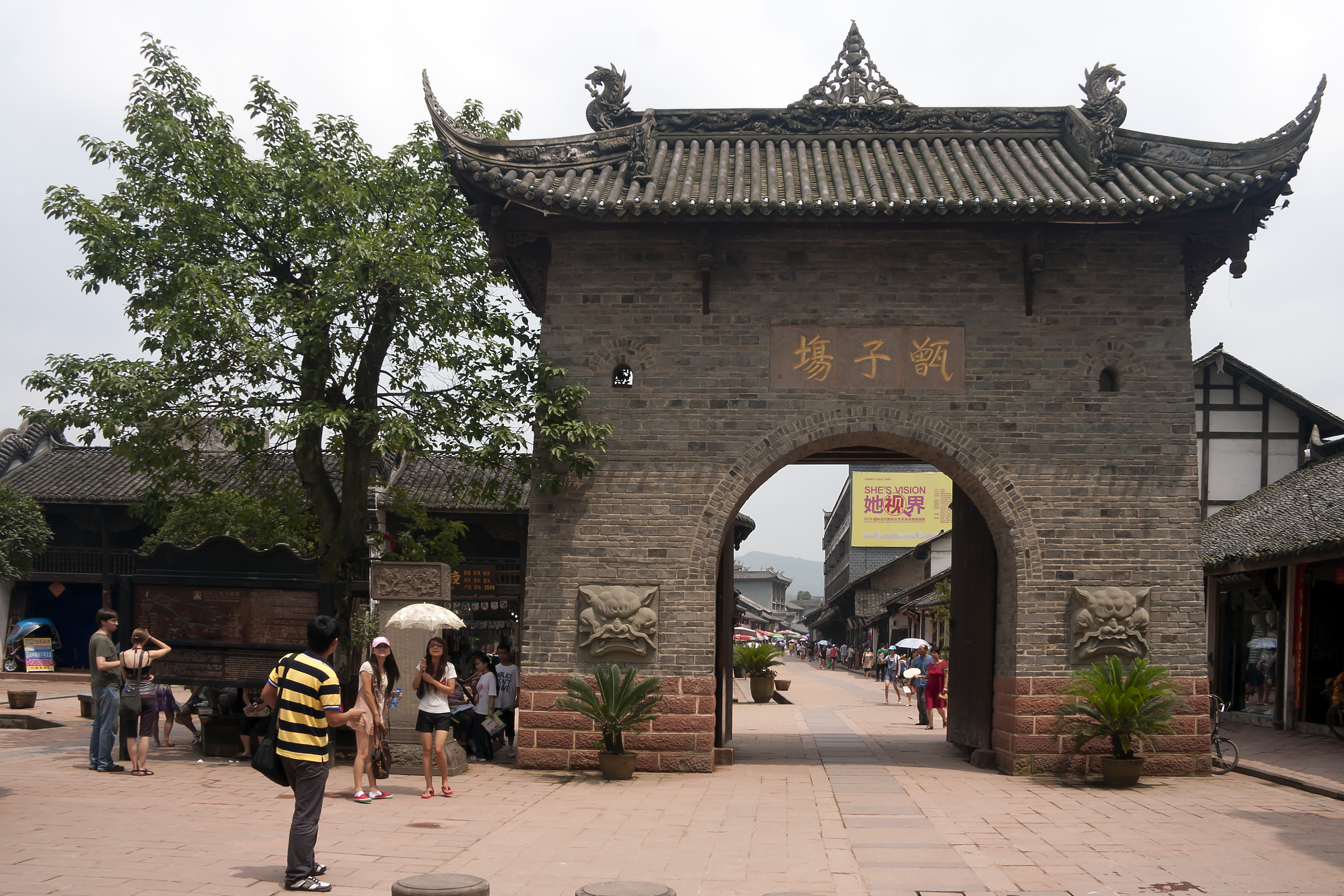
Luodai Ancient Town

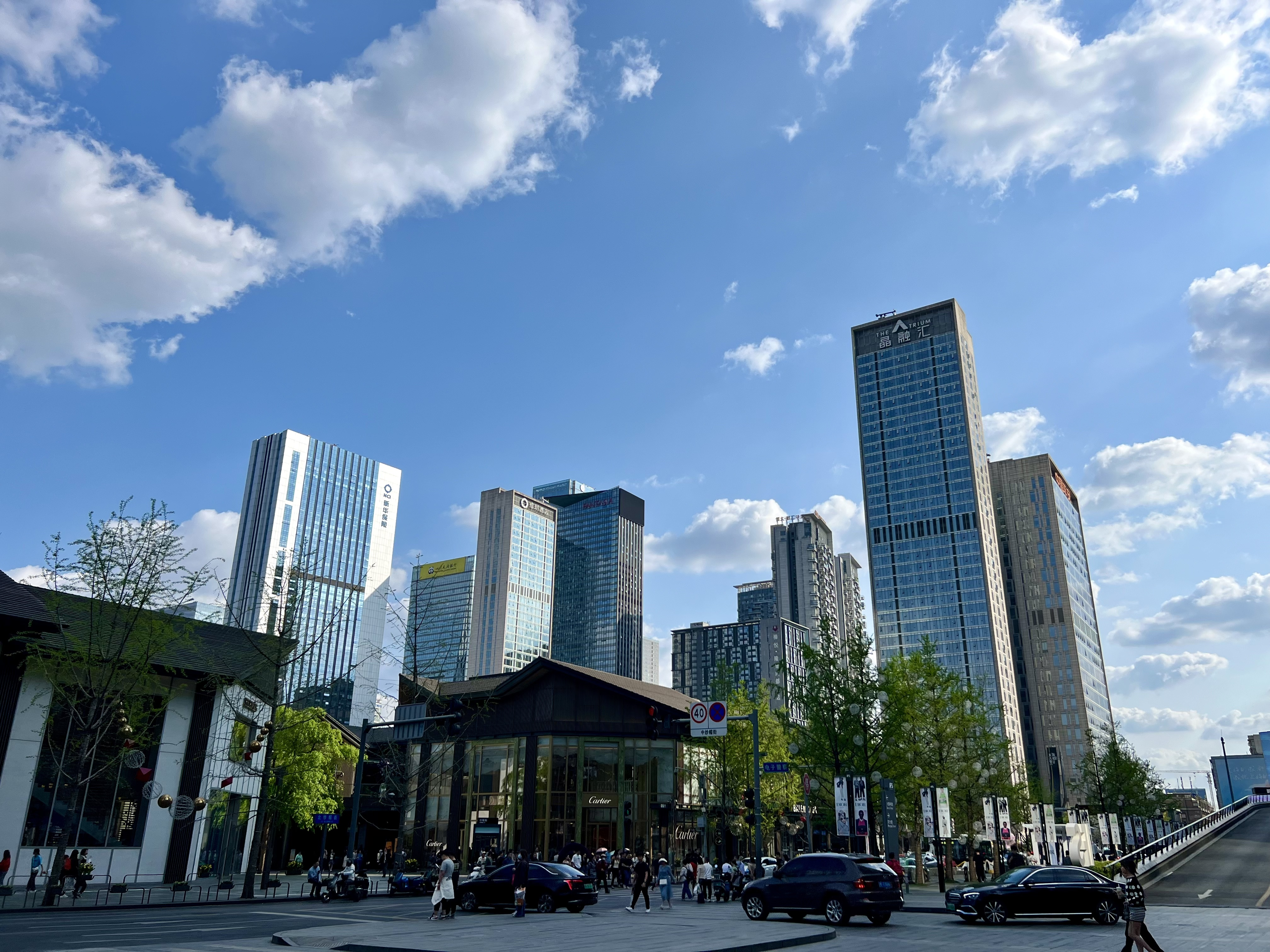
Shamao Street

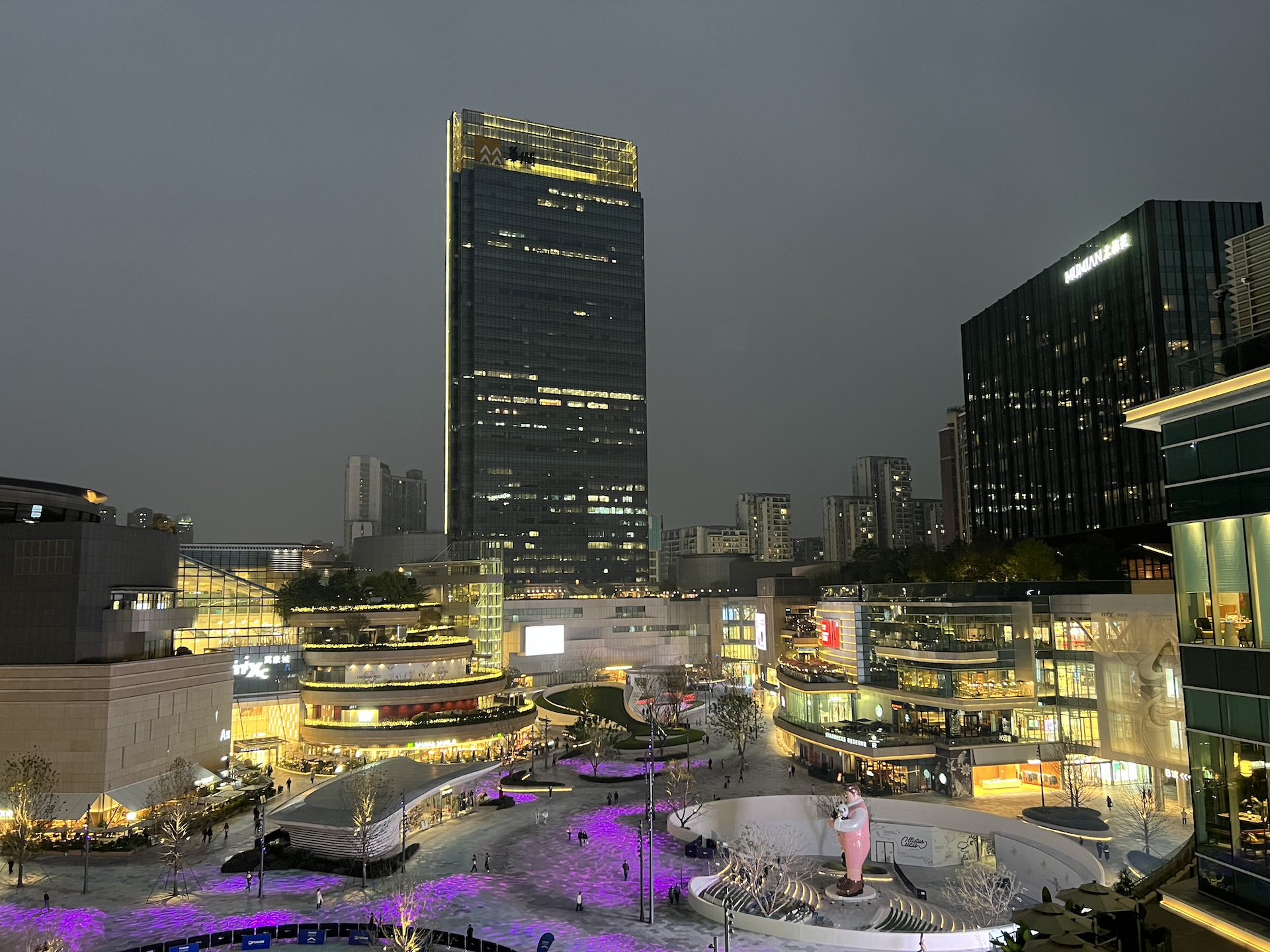
Mixc Complex Chengdu

South Renmin Road

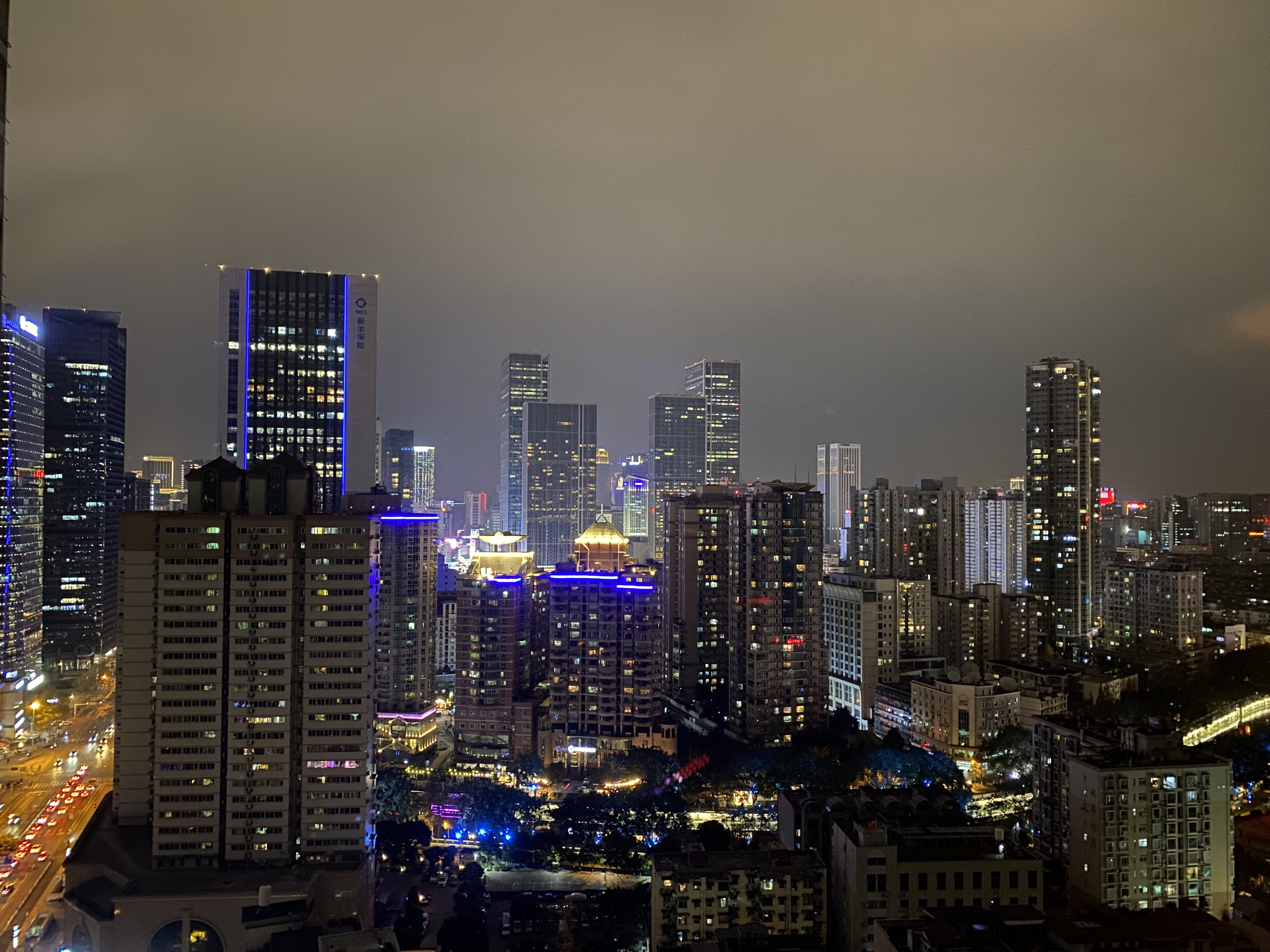
Jinjiang District cityscape

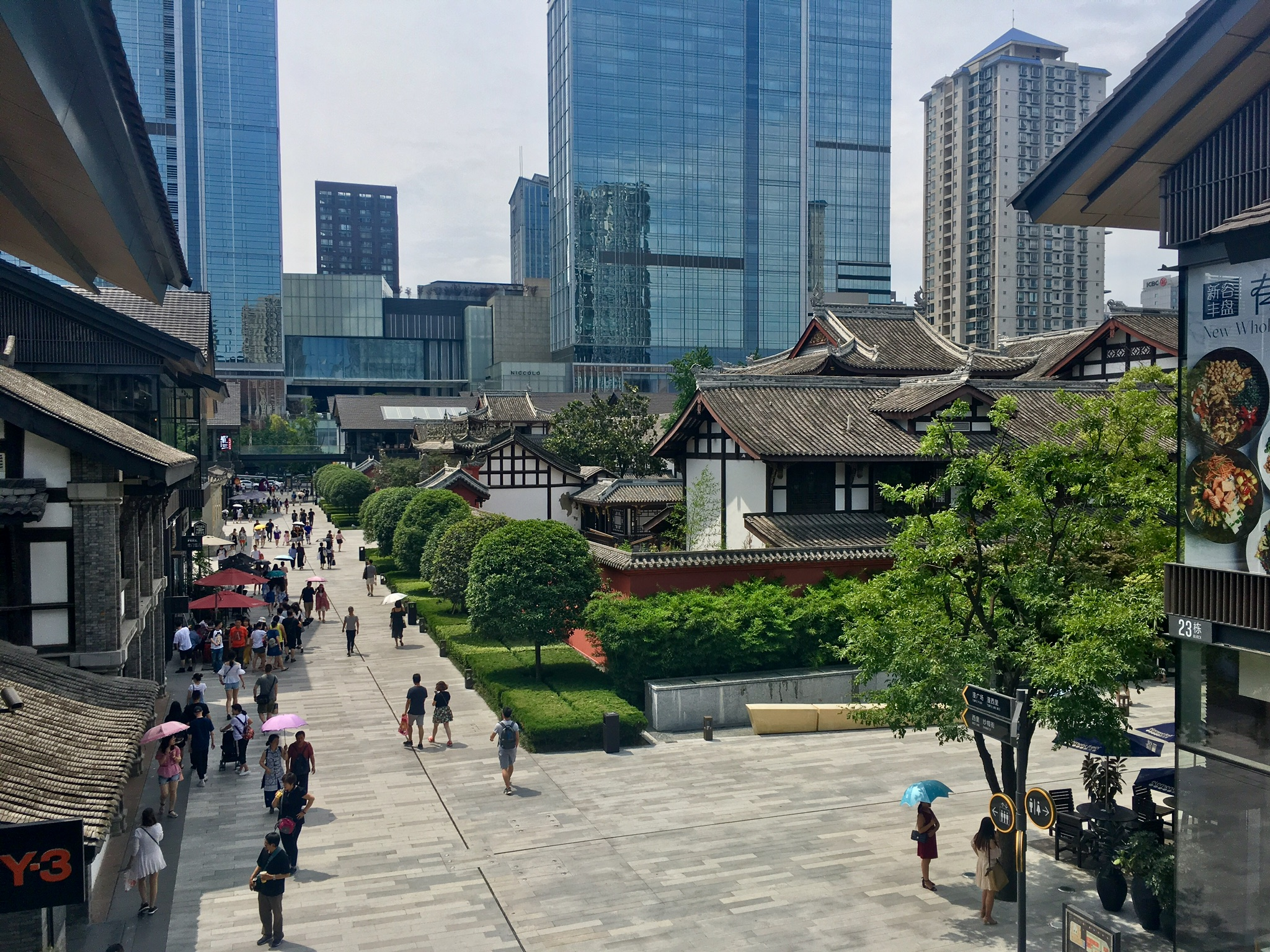
Taikoo Li, Chengdu (Downtown Chengdu)

IFS, Hongxing Road, Chengdu

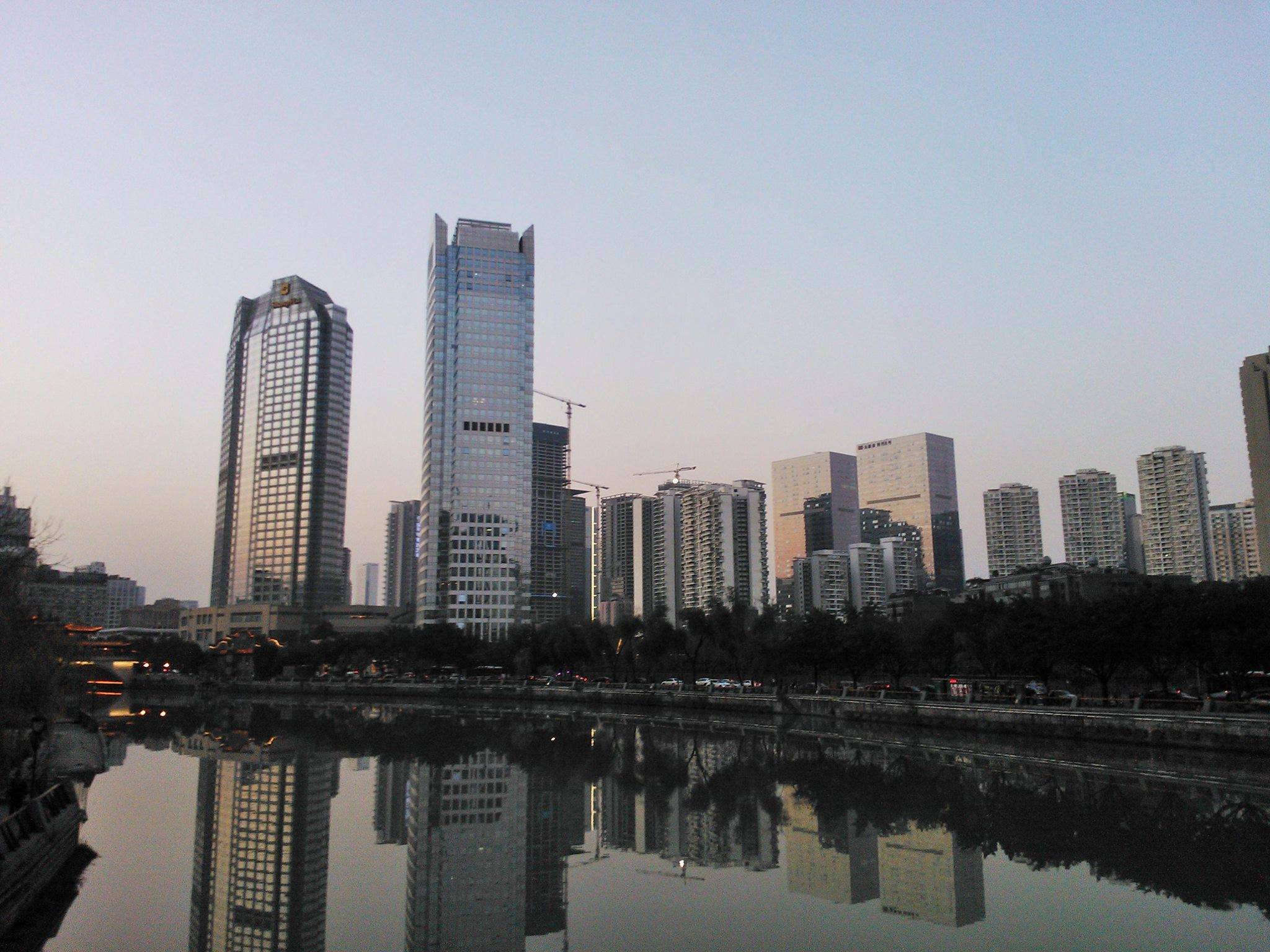
Jin River, Shangri-la Hotel Chengdu

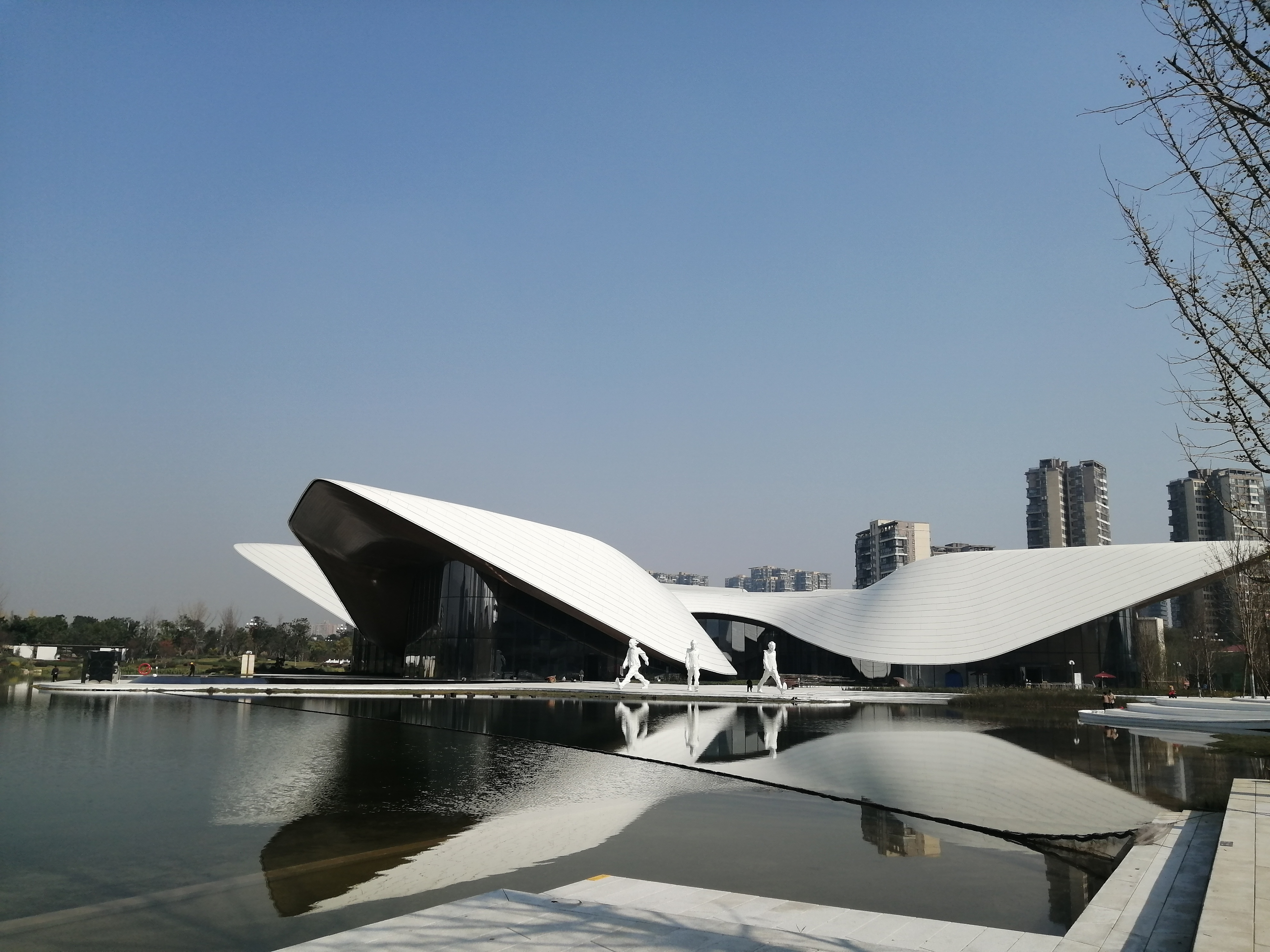
Chengdu Tianfu Art Museum

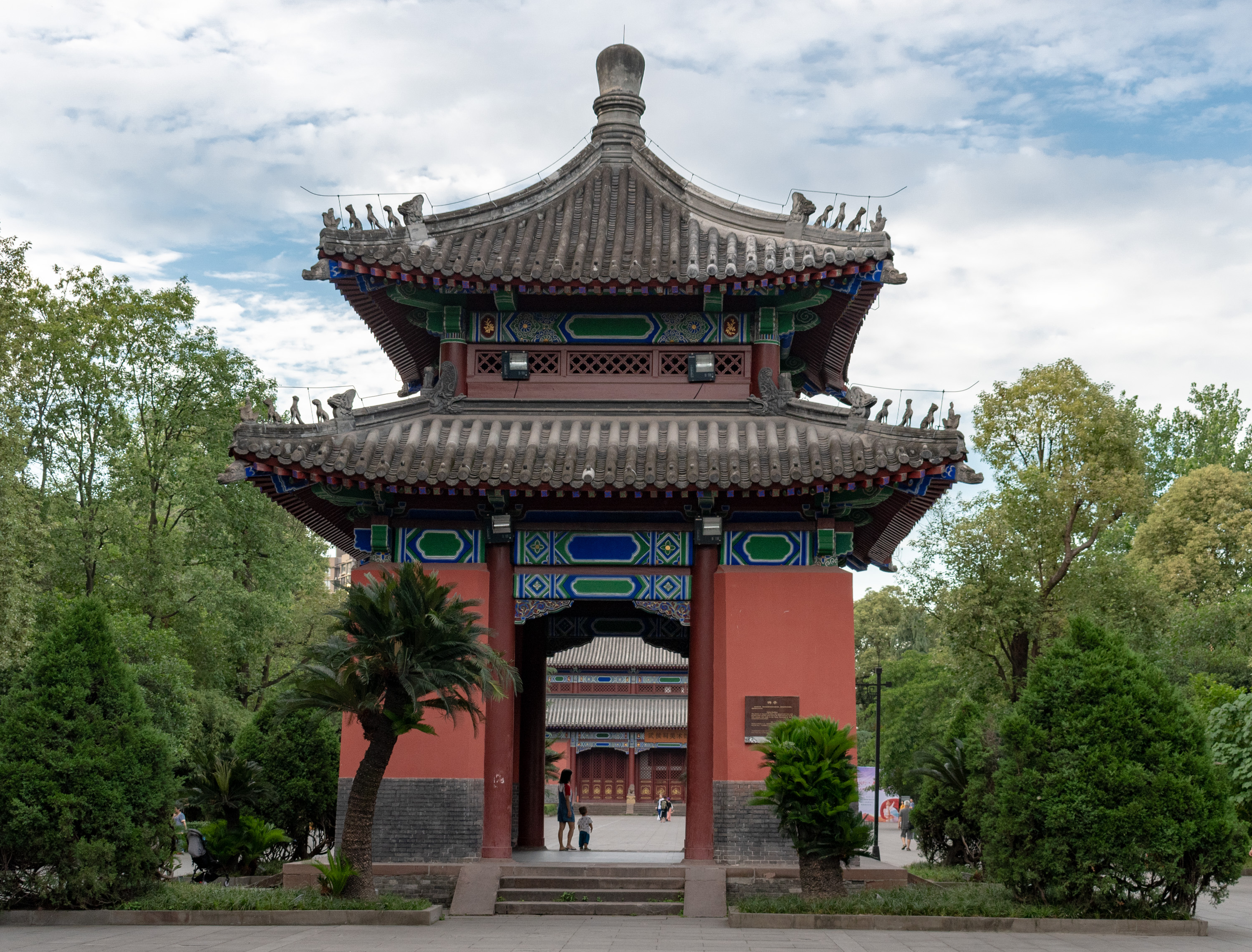
Liu Xiang Mausoleum

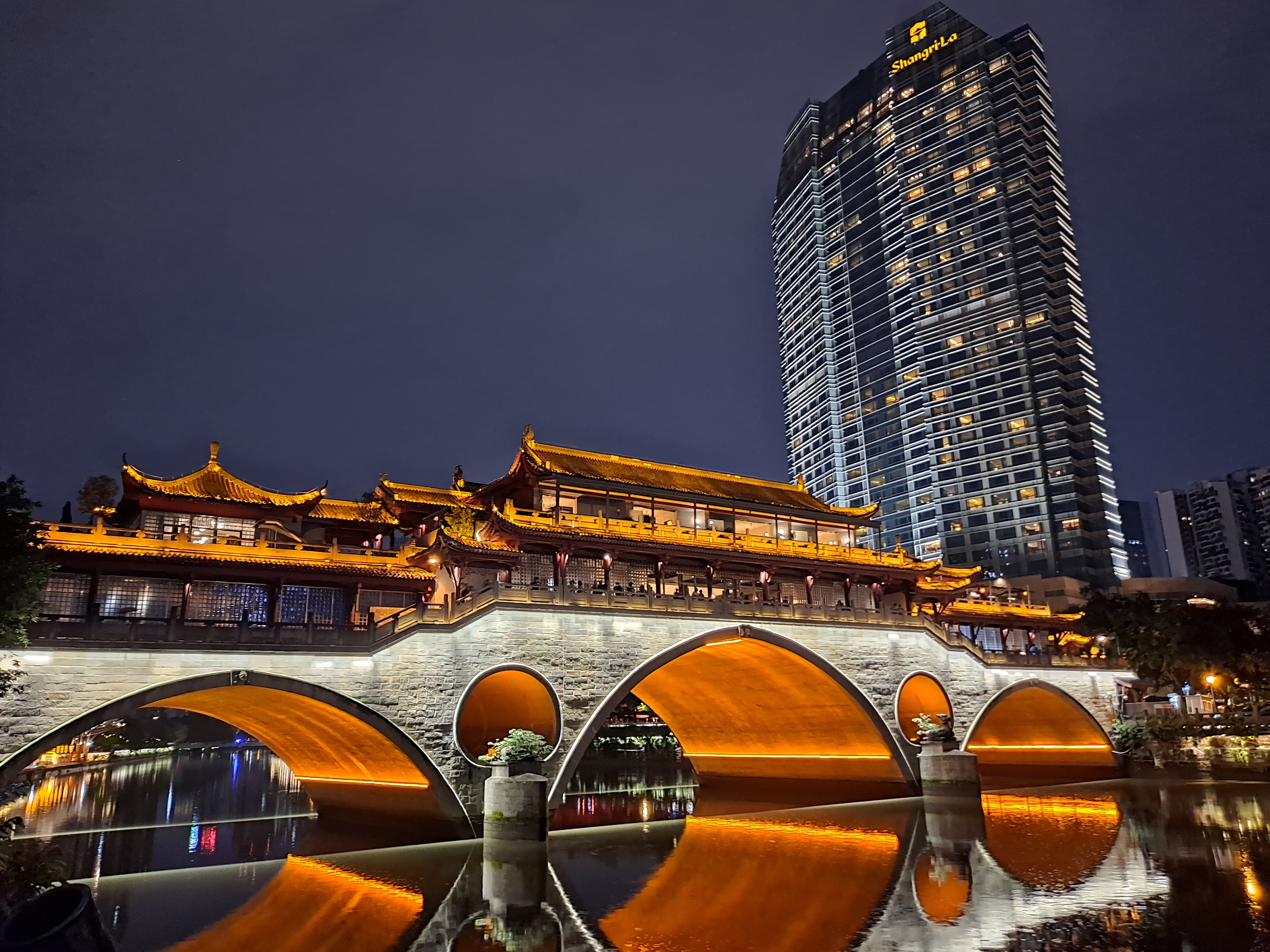
Anshun Bridge and Jinjiang River

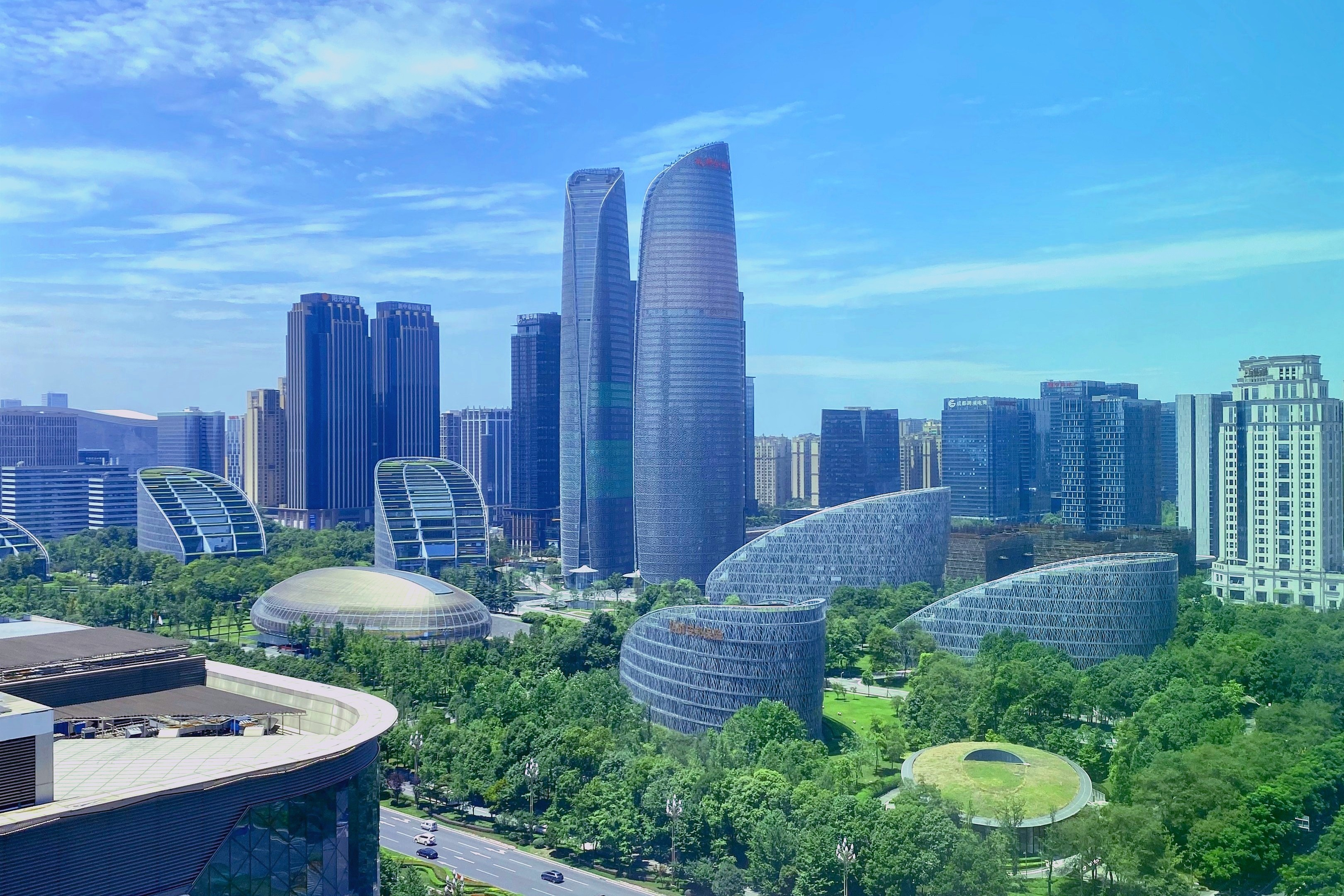
Tianfu Financial Center

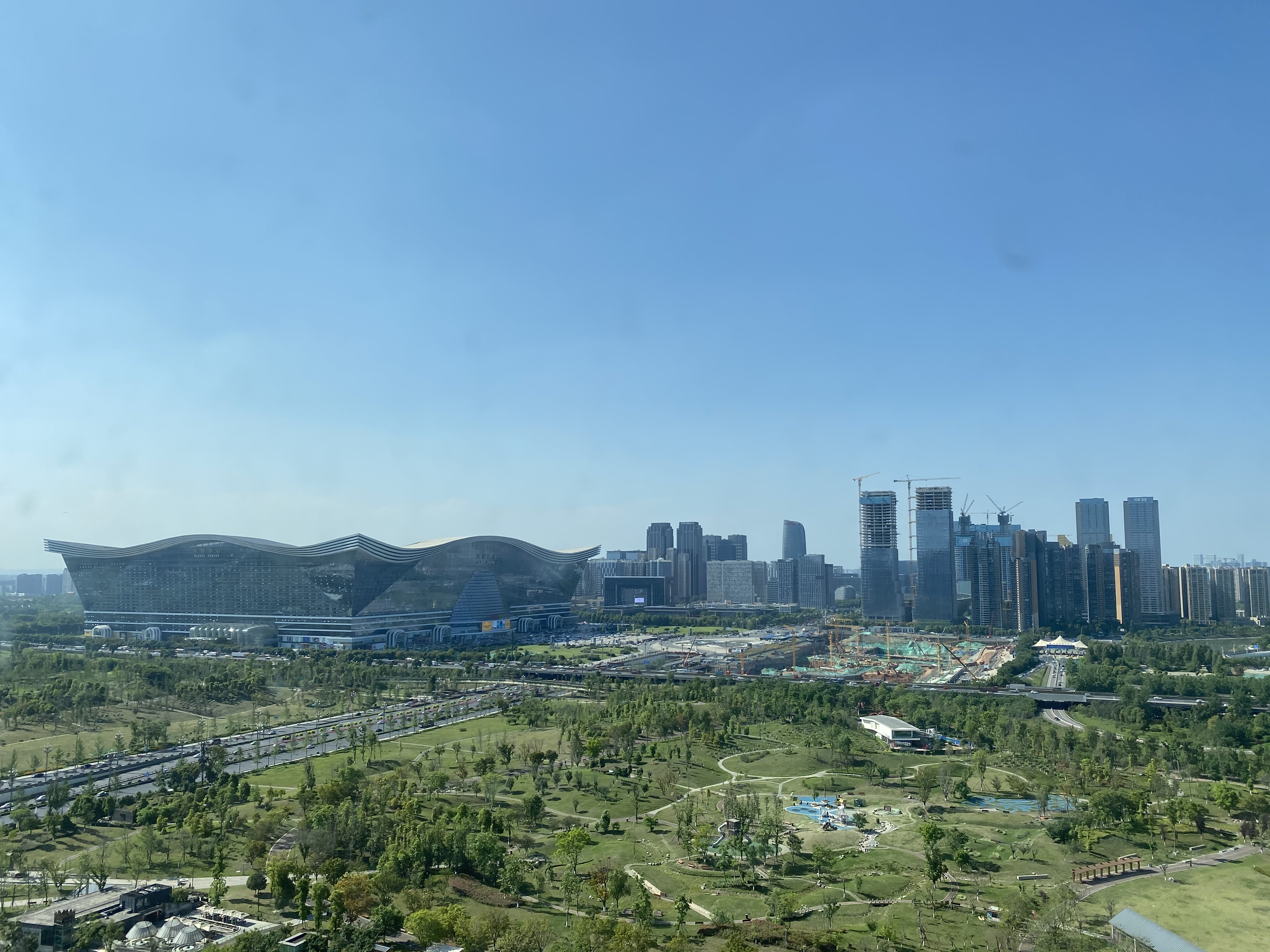
Chengdu Global Center

The "Gold Building" Mall, Chunxi Road

== Demographics ==
Historical population

Year	Pop.	±%
1953	857,000	—
1964	1,583,000	+84.7%
1970	6,922,918	+337.3%
1975	7,819,732	+13.0%
1980	8,225,399	+5.2%
1985	8,626,770	+4.9%
1990	9,195,004	+6.6%
1995	9,715,977	+5.7%

Year	Pop.	±%
2000	10,392,531	+7.0%
2005	10,820,285	+4.1%
2010	14,047,625	+29.8%
2020	20,937,757	+49.0%
2021	21,192,000	+1.2%
2022	21,268,000	+0.4%
2023	21,403,000	+0.6%

Population size may be affected by changes in administrative divisions. The 2021 data is a year-end estimate. 2022/3 from Sina.

According to the 2020 Chinese census, the municipality had 20,937,757 inhabitants; the metropolitan area itself was home to 16,045,577 inhabitants, including those of the 12 urban districts plus Guanghan City (in Deyang). Chengdu is the largest city in Sichuan and the fourth largest in China. 21,192,000 for 2021, adding more residents than any other city in the country.

As of 2015, the OECD (Organization for Economic Cooperation and Development) estimated the population of the Chengdu metropolitan area at 18.1 million.

== Culture ==
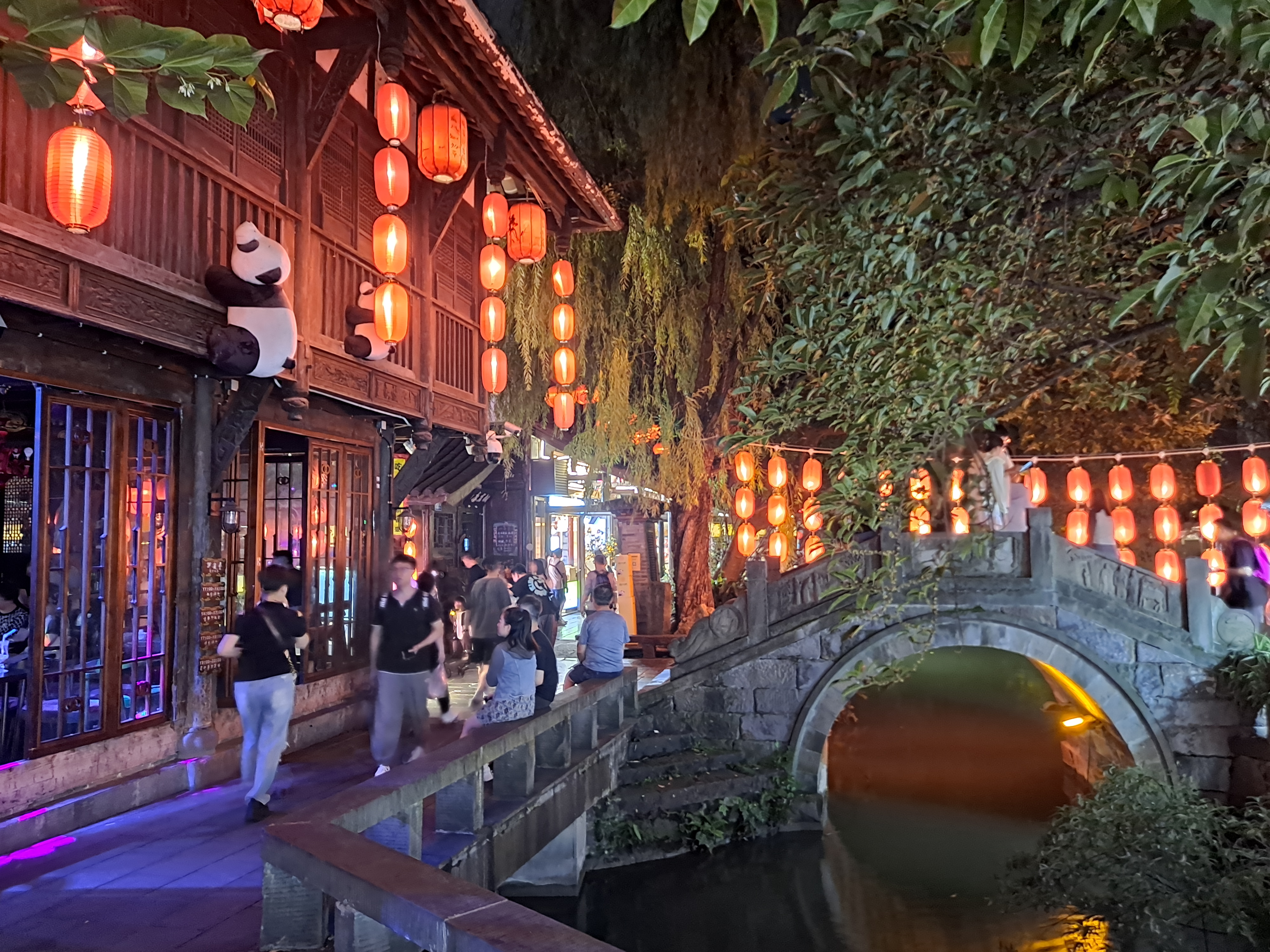
Jinli historical district of Chengdu

In 2006, China Daily named Chengdu China's fourth-most-livable city.

=== Literature ===
Some of China's most important literature comes from Chengdu. The city has been home to literary giants, such as Sima Xiangru and Yang Xiong, two masters of Fu, a mixture of descriptive prose and verse during the Tang dynasty; Li Bai and Du Fu, the most eminent poets of the Tang and Song dynasties respectively; Yang Shen'an, a famous scholar of the Ming dynasty; and Guo Moruo and Ba Jin, two well-known modern writers. Chang Qu, a historian of Chengdu during the Jin dynasty, compiled the earliest local historical records, the Record of Hua Yang State. Zhao Chongzuo, a poet in Chengdu during the Later Shu Kingdom, edited Among the Flowers, the first anthology of Ci in China's history. Meng Chang, the king of Later Shu, wrote the first couplet for the Spring Festival, which says, "A harvest year accepts celebrations, good festivals foreshadow long springs."

In 2023, Chengdu hosted the 81st World Science Fiction Convention, having beat out Winnipeg, Canada, in site-selection voting in 2021.

=== Fine art ===
During the period of the Five Dynasties, Huang Quan, a painter in Chengdu, initiated the Fine-Brush Flower-and-Bird Painting School with other painters. At that time, "Hanlin Painting Academy" was the earliest royal academy in China.

=== Religion ===
Huangcheng Mosque

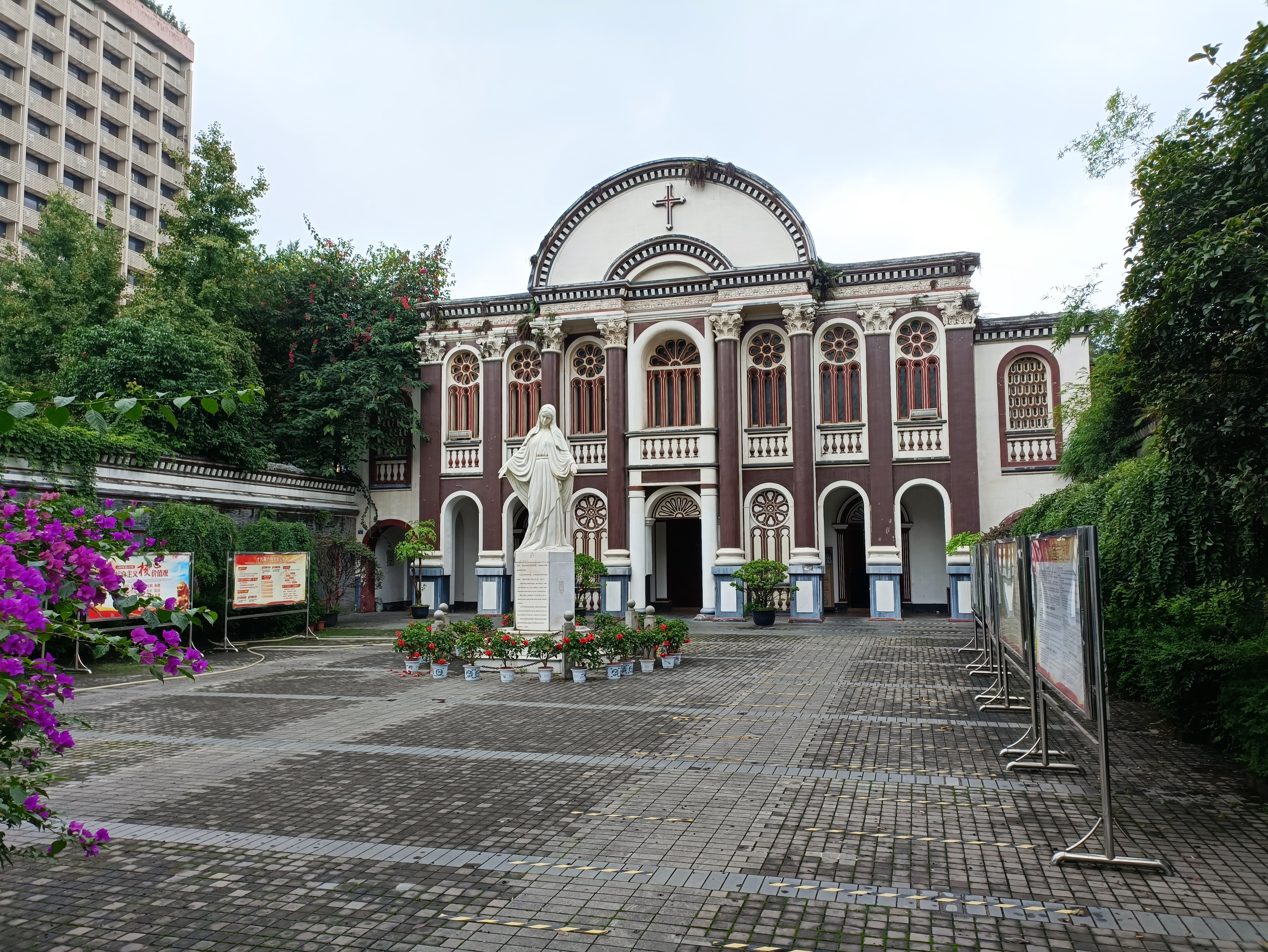
Cathedral of the Immaculate Conception, seat of the Diocese of Chengdu

Islam has a long history in Sichuan dating to the Tang dynasty (618–907), 12 mosques are located in Chengdu. Huangcheng Mosque in the center of Chengdu dates from the 16th century.

Chengdu contains official, Roman Catholic and Protestant congregations, some of which are underground churches.

The Apostolic Vicariate of Szechwan (now known as Diocese of Chengdu) was established on 15 October 1696. Artus de Lionne, a French missionary of Paris Foreign Missions Society, was appointed as the first Apostolic Vicar.

In 1890, the Canadian Methodist Mission was seeking additional stations in Asia. In February 1891, Dr. Virgil Chittenden Hart, who had been Superintendent of the New York Methodist Mission Society of Central China, recommended at a meeting that Chengtu be the site of its first Mission. During the meeting, it was proposed that he lead the contingent to establish it, having built western hospitals as well as boys' and girls' schools at missions he established on the Yangtze and Gan Rivers 1866–88. On 9 May 1891, Hart arrived in Chengtu; two weeks later, he bought a home and had it subdivided into living quarters and a dispensary for the later-arriving Missionary staff to move into.

On 24 June 1892, the doors of Chengtu's first Protestant Mission Headquarters were opened, with over 1,000 people from the community in attendance. The first Methodist religious service was held the following Sunday, with only a few attendants. The first western dispensary in Sichuan was opened on 3 November 1892 with sixteen patients seeking care. The mission site became so popular that a larger space was secured near Chengtu's East Gate in the spring of 1893. This site is where the city's first Methodist church (Sï-Shen-Tsï Methodist Church) and hospital were built. These were later razed by rioting Chinese in 1895, and the Mission staff retreated to Chongqing and later Shanghai to escape the marauders. Dr. Virgil Hart traveled to Peking to demand redress, and full payment of retribution was collected from Sichuan Viceroy Liu Ping Chang. The mission compound was quickly rebuilt, only to be destroyed once more in the riots of 1901. These were rebuilt a second time and later missionaries would relocate and expand the Boys' and Girls' Schools just south of the city, dedicating the Divinity College as Hart College in 1914; a part of the West China Union University, that is now Sichuan University and the West China School of Medicine (Huaxiyida). During the Cultural Revolution, the Sï-Shen-Tsï Methodist Church building was no longer in use and the building was entrusted to the nearby Chengdu City Second People's Hospital for management. The hospital used the chapel as a kindergarten and the office of the hospital equipment department. In 1984, the hospital returned the chapel building to the church.

In December 2018, the authorities attempted to close a 500-member underground church, the Early Rain Covenant Church, led by Pastor Wang Yi. Over 100 members of the church were arrested, including the pastor and his wife. The church's kindergarten and theological college were raided, and its media outlets were shut down. Before his arrest, church member Li Yingqiang declared, "Even if we are down to our last five, worship and gatherings will still go on because our faith is real. […] Persecution is a price worth paying for the Lord." Police are said to have told one member that the church had been declared an illegal organization. Chinese media were banned from reporting the events. Video footage, which found its way onto Western social media, showed arrests and photographs alleged to be of injuries inflicted by the police. From a photo of Ms. Jiang's detention warrant it appears that the authorities have charged the church's leaders with "inciting subversion of state power," which carries a maximum sentence of 15 years.

In 2012, a Chabad Jewish Center was established in Chengdu, after moving five times, a permanent location was secured at Wuhou District.

=== Theater ===
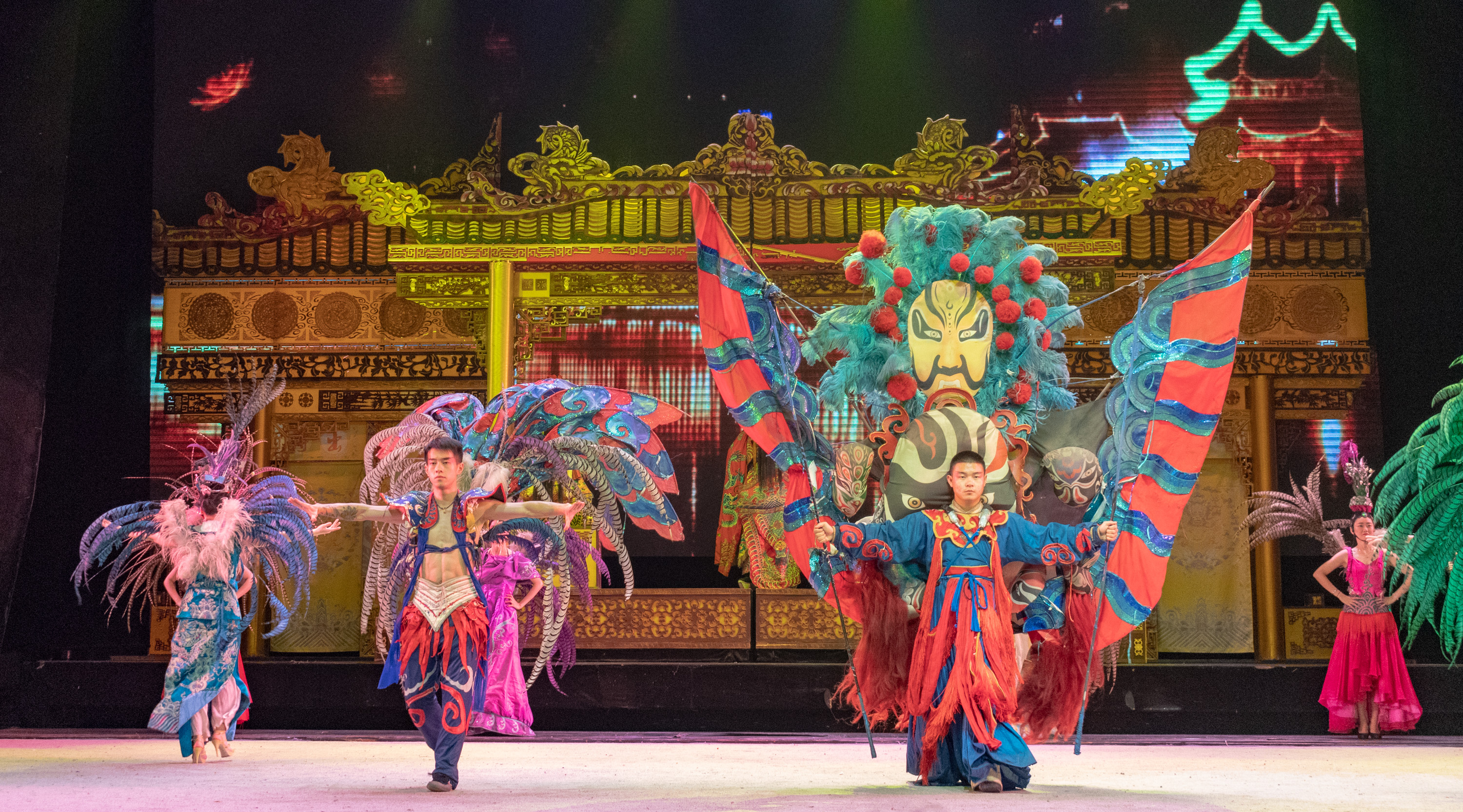
Sichuan Opera

The saying "Shu opera towers above all other performances in the world" reflects the achievement of Sichuan opera and Zaju (an ancient form of comedic drama involving dancing, singing, poetry, and miming). In the city, the first opera, "Bullfighting," was written in the Warring States period. The first detailed opera was staged at the royal court of the Shu Kingdom during the Three Kingdoms period. China's first clearly recorded Zaju was also performed in Chengdu. Tombs of witty Han dynasty poets were excavated in Chengdu. And face-changing masks and fire breathing remain hallmarks of the Sichuan opera.

=== Language ===
The native language in Chengdu is Chengdu dialect, a form of Sichuanese. The Chengdu dialect has been influential in Chinese comedy and rap music.

=== Culinary art and tea culture ===
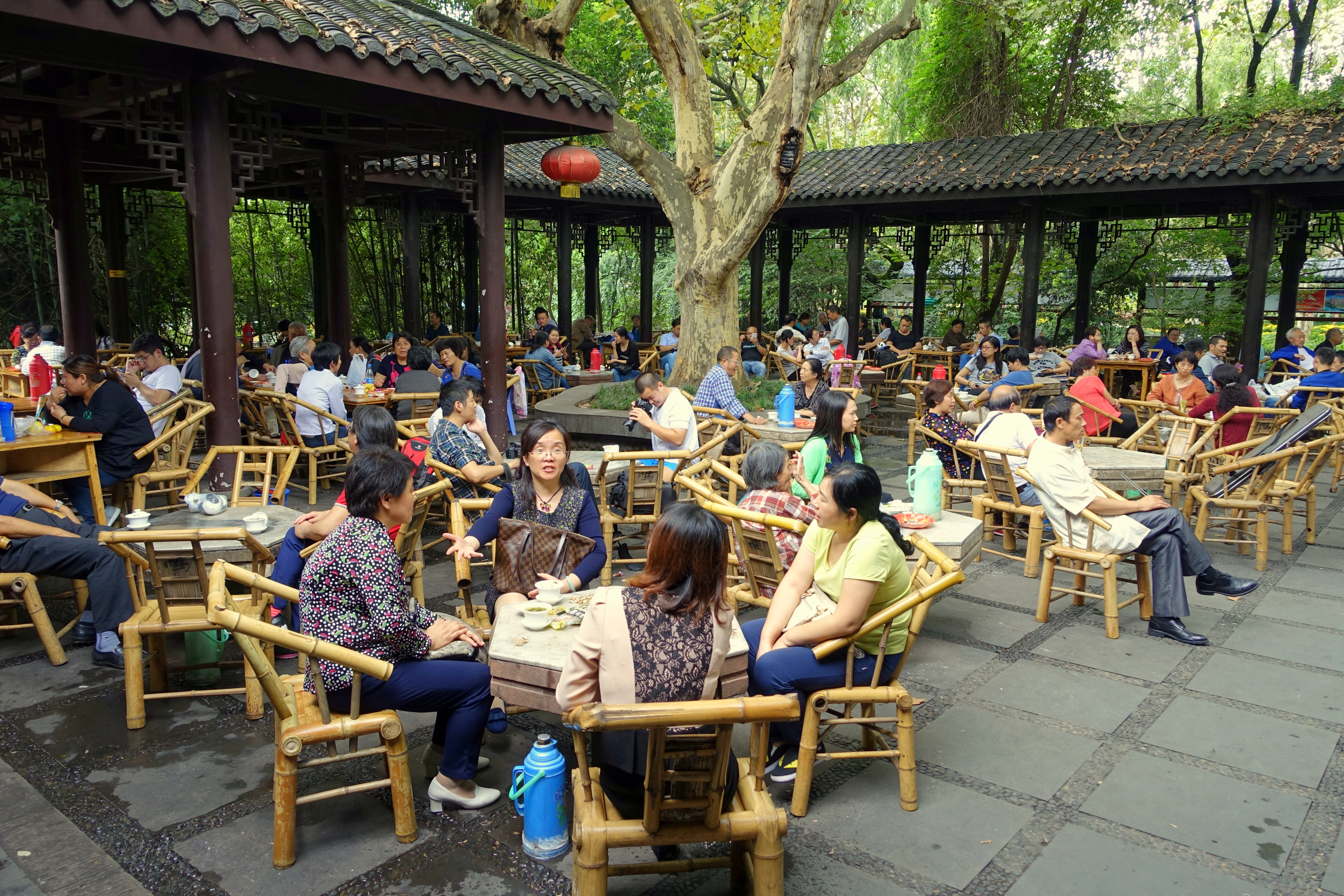
A teahouse in People's Park in Chengdu

The distinct characteristic of Sichuan cuisine is the use of spicy chilies and peppercorns. Famous local dishes include Mapo doufu, Chengdu Hot pot, and Dan Dan Mien. Both Mapo Doufu and Dan Dan Mien contain Sichuan peppers. An article by the Los Angeles Times (2006) called Chengdu "China's party city" for its carefree lifestyle. Chengdu has more tea houses and bars than Shanghai despite having less than half the population. In 2023, there were more than 30,000 teahouses in Chengdu, and there were 3,566 legally registered bars, nightclubs, and dance halls in the city. A statistical report in 2019 showed that Chengdu had more bars than Shanghai, becoming the city with the most bars in China. Chengdu's tea culture dates back over a thousand years, including its time as the starting point of the Southern Silk Road.

Chengdu is officially recognized and named by UNESCO as the "City of Gastronomy".

==== Teahouse ====
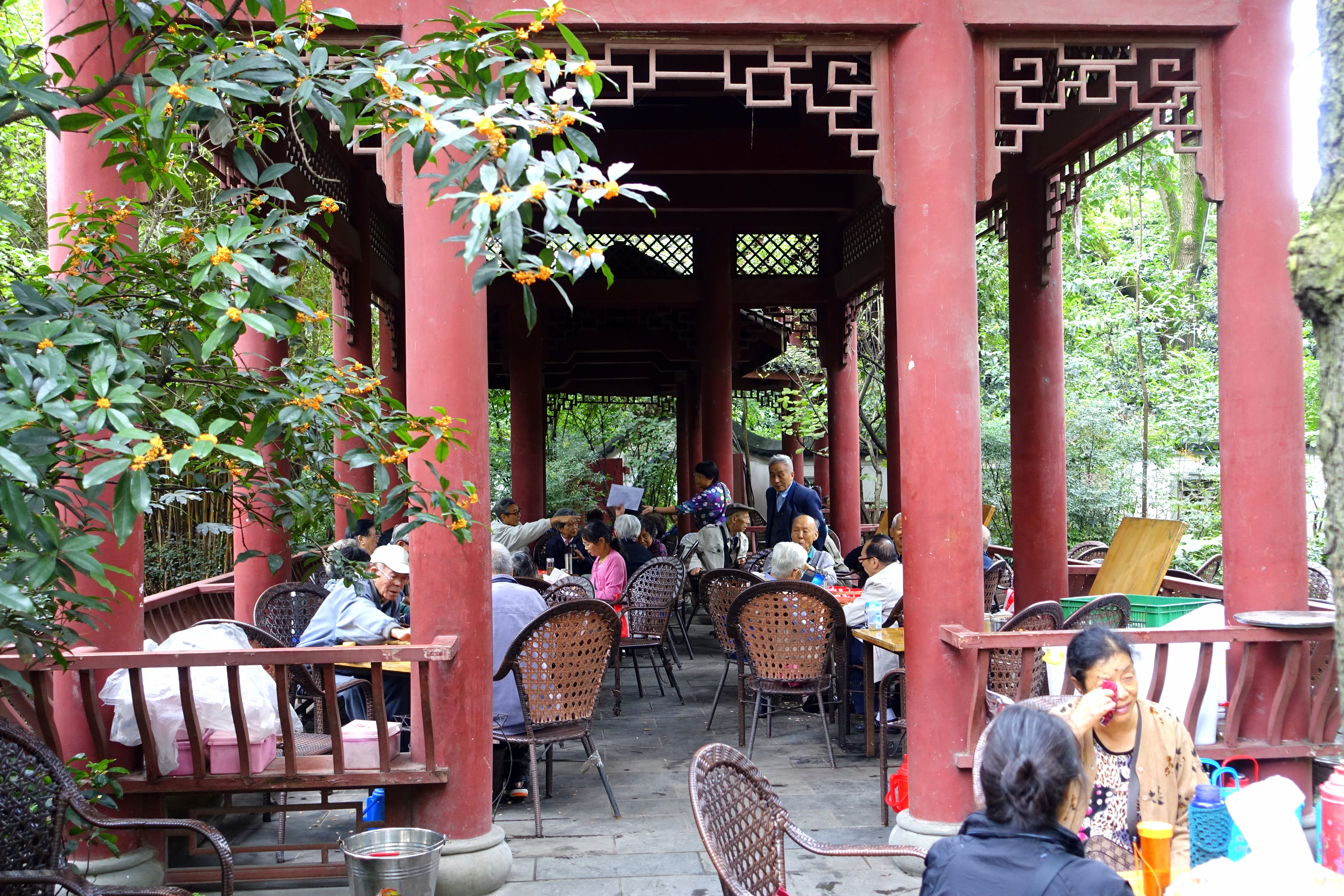
Teahouse in Chengdu

Tea houses are ubiquitous in the city, ranging from ornate traditional establishments with bamboo furniture to simple modern ones. Teas on offer include jasmine, longjing and biluochun tea. Tea houses are popular venues for playing mahjong, getting a massage, or having one's ears cleaned. Some larger tea houses offer live entertainment such as Sichuan opera performances.

==== Hot pot ====
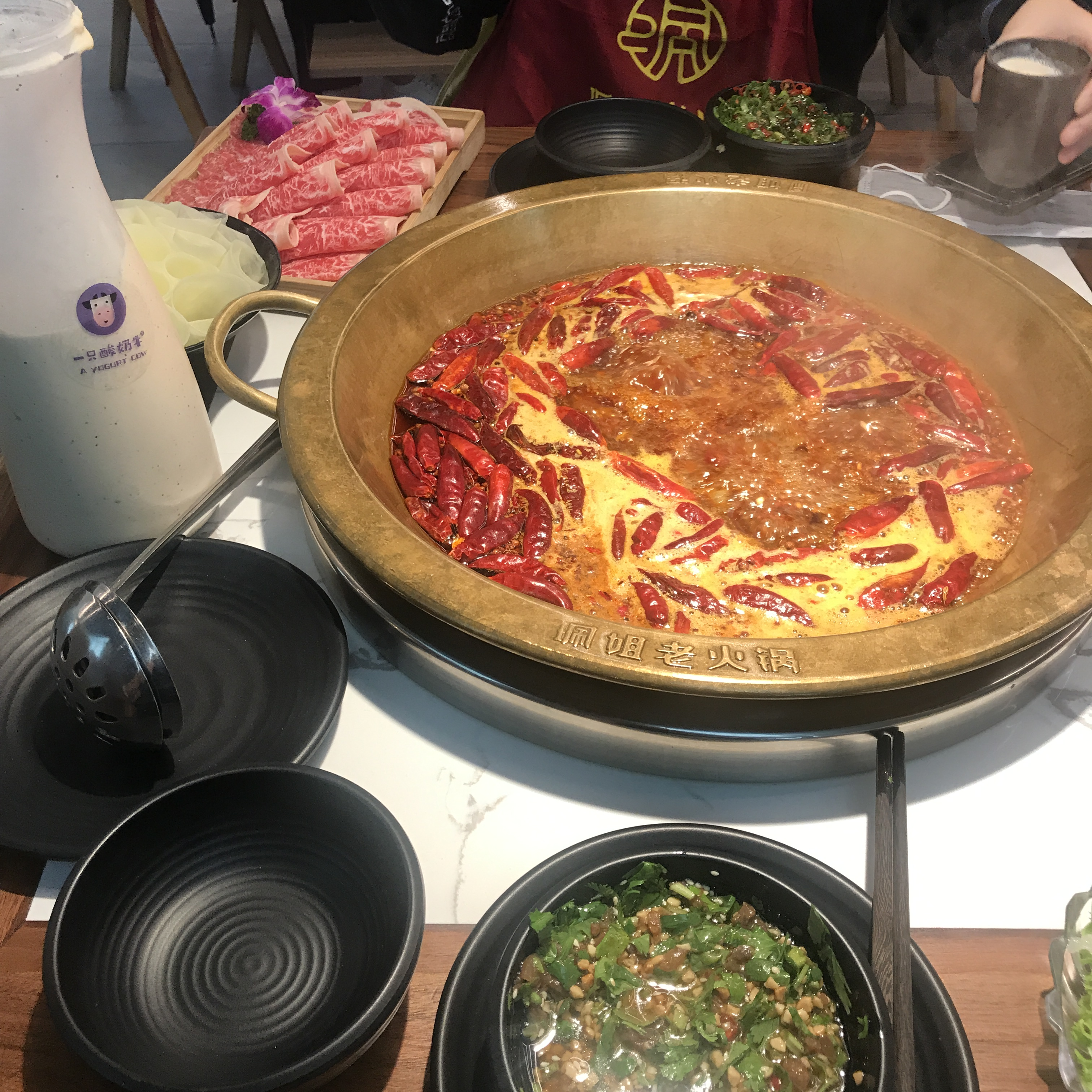
Hot pot

Chengdu is known for its hot pot. Hot pot is a traditional Sichuanese dish, made by cooking vegetables, fish, and/or meat in boiling spicy broth. A type of food suitable for a gathering of friends, hot pot attracts both locals and tourists. Hot pot restaurants can be found throughout Chengdu.

=== Mahjong ===
Mahjong originated in the Ming and Qing Dynasties in China. Most scholars believe that it is related to the evolution of the card "horse hanging" in the Ming Dynasty, which was gradually standardized in the late Qing Dynasty. Another view is that it originated from "leaf play" or ancient divination, but the evidence is insufficient. Since then, mahjong has become popular rapidly and spread overseas with immigrants, forming diversified rules and becoming a global cultural symbol.

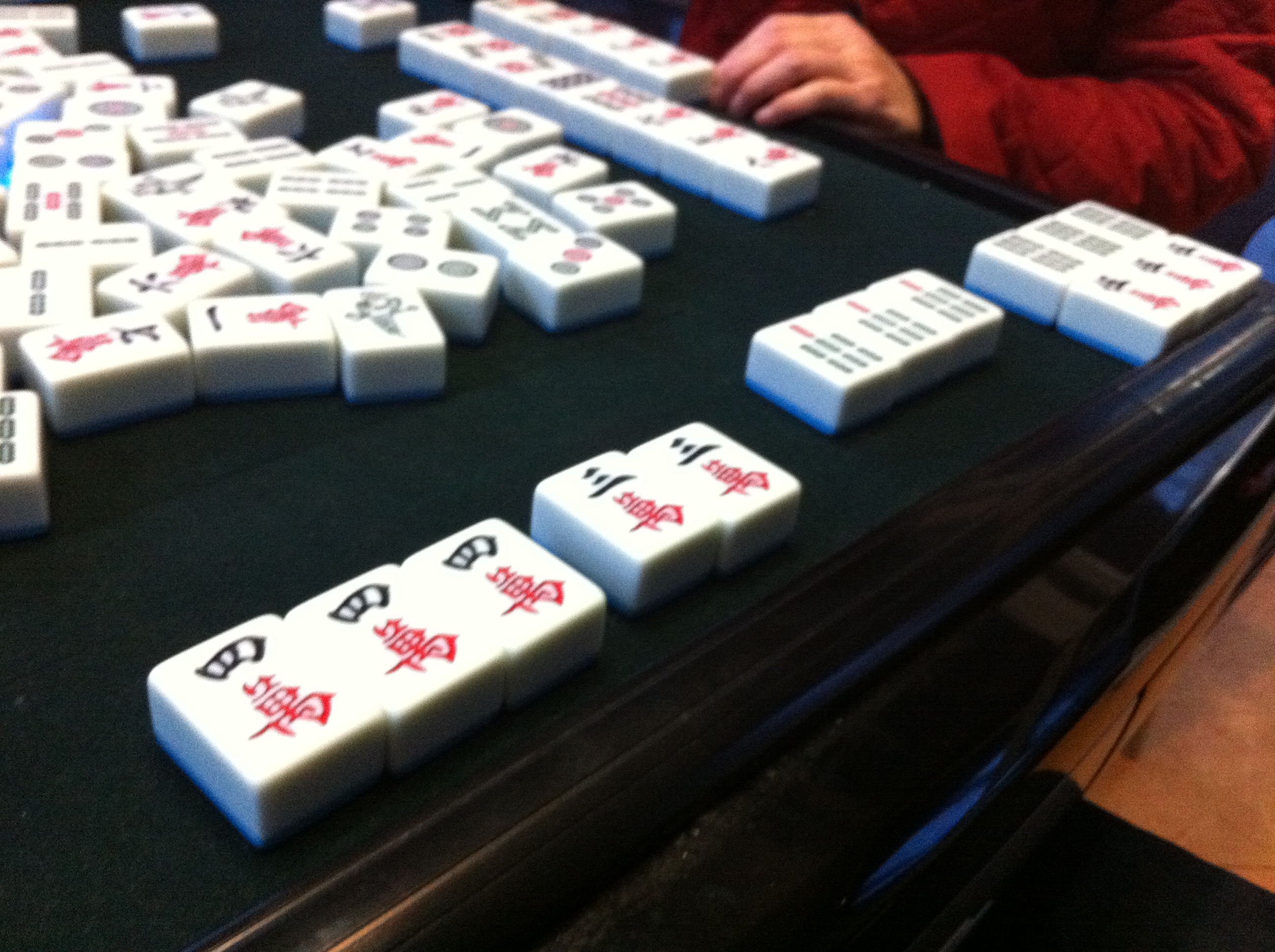
Mahjong

Mahjong has been an essential part of most people's lives in many local communities. After daytime work, people gather at home or at street tea houses to play Mahjong. On sunny days, locals like to play Mahjong on the sidewalks to enjoy the sunshine and spend time with friends.

Mahjong is the most popular form of entertainment among locals for several reasons. Chengdu locals have simplified the rules and made it easier to play than Cantonese Mahjong. Also, Mahjong in Chengdu is a way to meet old friends and to strengthen family relationships. In fact, many business people negotiate deals while playing Mahjong.

=== Rural tourism: Nong Jia Le ===
Chengdu claims to have first practiced the modern business model of 'Nong Jia Le' (Happy Rural Homes). It refers to the practice of suburban and rural residents converting their homes into restaurants, hotels, and entertainment spaces to attract city dwellers.

Nong Jia Le features different styles and price levels and has been thriving around Chengdu. They offer gateways for city dwellers to escape the city, serve delicious, affordable homemade dishes, and provide mahjong facilities.

=== Digital Cultural Technology Lab ===
The Chengdu Digital Cultural Technology Lab, a collaboration between the Chengdu Science and Technology Bureau and local universities, focuses on applying VR and AR technologies to cultural heritage preservation. The lab creates high-fidelity digital models of historical sites and artifacts, enabling virtual tours and academic research, thereby expanding public access to Chengdu's cultural resources.

== Main sights ==
=== World natural and cultural heritage sites ===
==== Mount Qingcheng ====
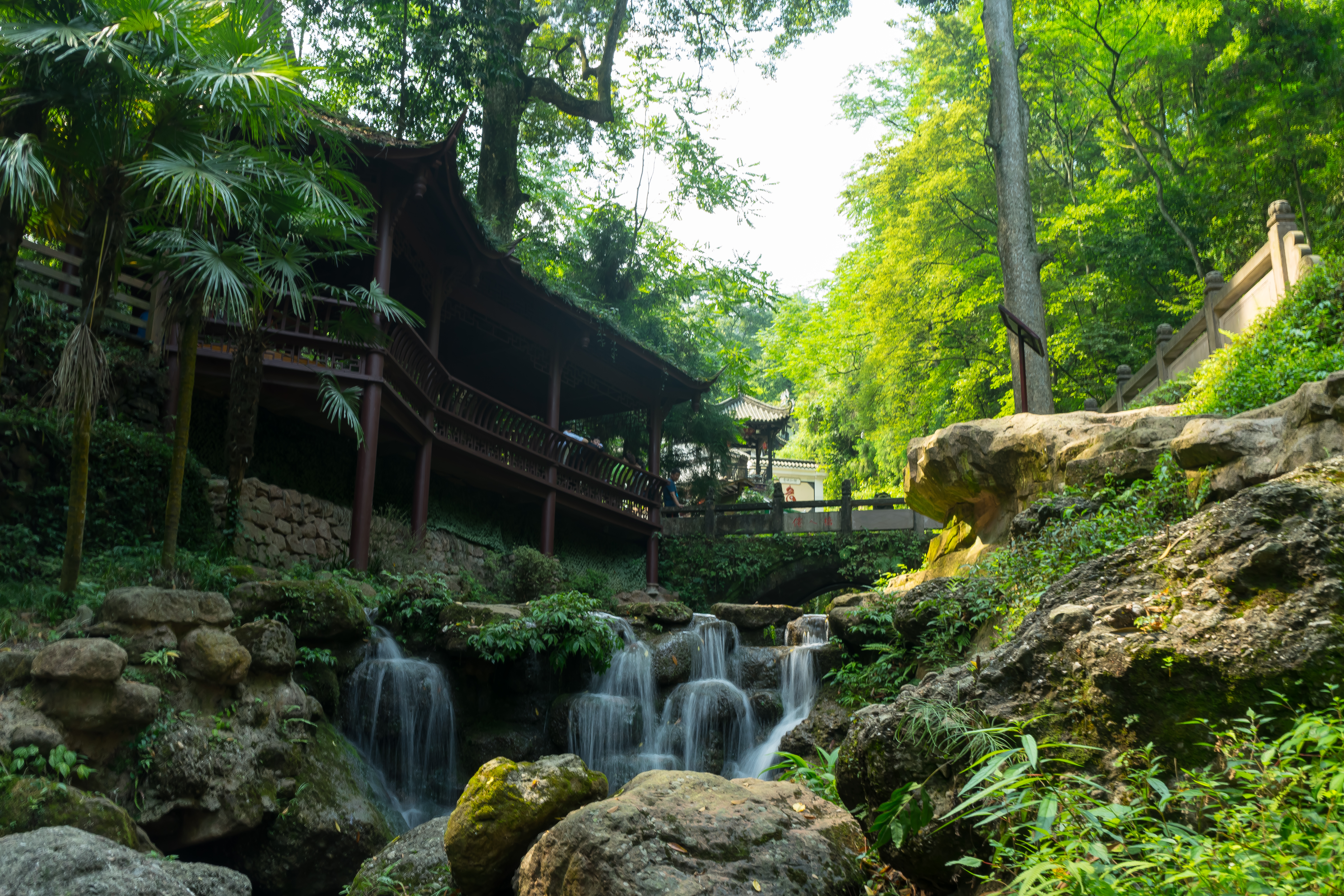
Mount Qingcheng

Mount Qingcheng is amongst the most important Taoism sites in China. It is situated in the suburbs of Dujiangyan City and connected to downtown Chengdu 70 km (43 mi) away by the Cheng-Guan Expressway.

At its peak, 1,600 m (5,200 ft) above sea level, Mount Qingcheng enjoys a cool climate, yet remains lush and green year-round, surrounded by hills and waterways. Mount Qingcheng's Fujian Temple, Tianshi Cave, and Shizu Hall are among the better-known Taoist holy sites. Shangqing Temple is noted for an evening phosphorescent glow locally referred to as "holy lights".

==== Dujiangyan Irrigation System ====
The Dujiangyan Irrigation System (58 km (36 mi) from downtown Chengdu) is the oldest existing irrigation project in the world, with a history of over 2000 years, diverting water without a dam to distribute water and filter sand, with inflow quantity control. Libing and his son built the system. The irrigation system prevents floods and droughts throughout the Plain of Chengdu.

==== Sichuan Giant Panda Sanctuaries ====
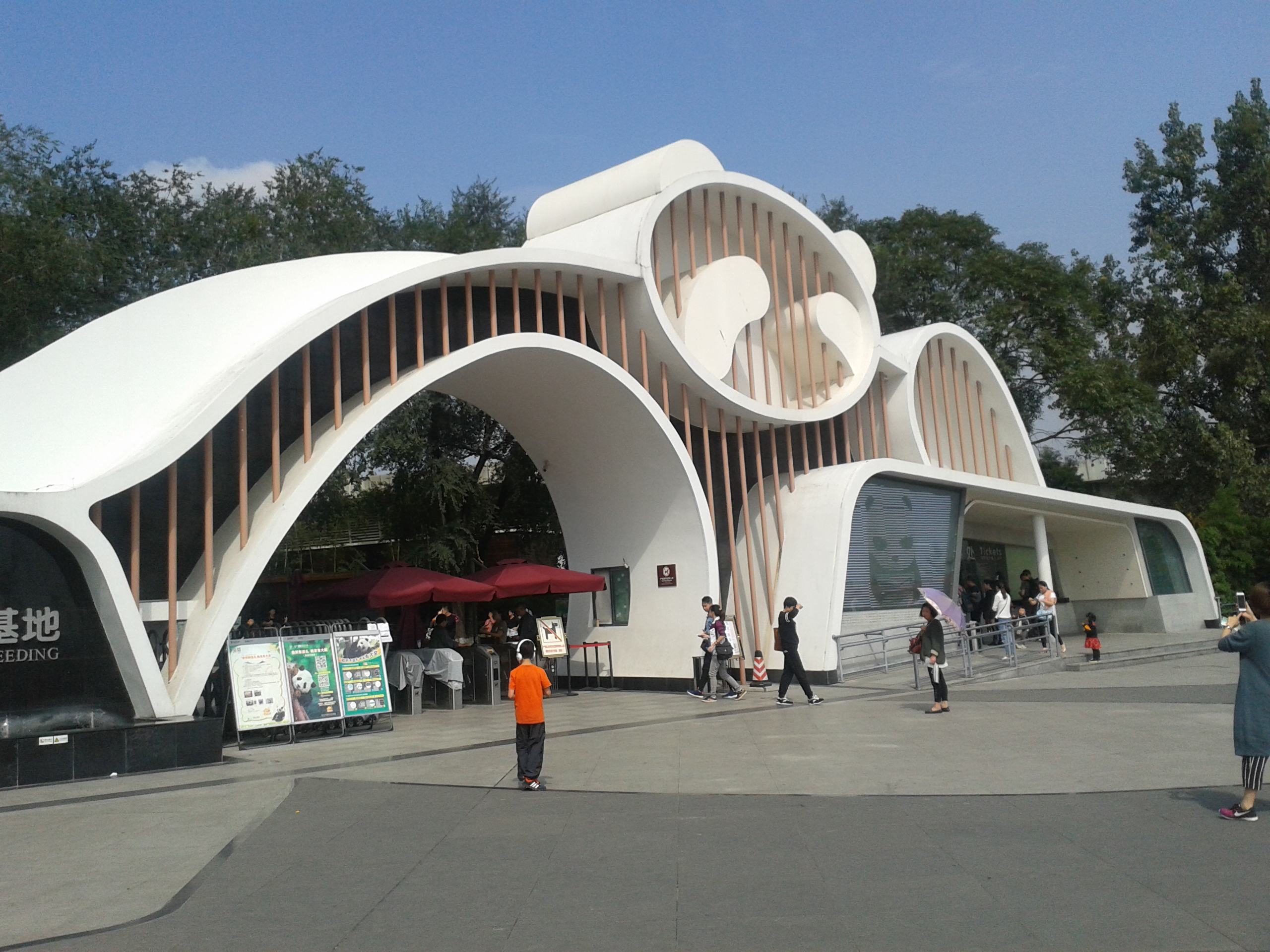
Chengdu Research Base of Giant Panda Breeding

Covering a total of 9,245 km^{2} (3,570 sq mi) over 12 distinct counties and 4 cities, Sichuan Giant Panda Sanctuaries, lie on the transitional alp-canyon belt between the Sichuan Basin and the Qinghai-Tibetan Plateau. It is the largest remaining continuous habitat for giant pandas and is home to more than 80 percent of the world's wild giant pandas. Globally speaking, it is also the most abundant temperate zone of greenery. The reserves of the habitat are 100–200 km (62–124 mi) away from Chengdu.

The Sichuan Giant Panda Sanctuaries are among the best-known of their kind in the world, with Wolong Nature Reserve generally considered the "homeland of pandas". It is a core habitat with unique natural conditions, complex landforms, and a temperate climate, supporting diverse wildlife. Siguniang Mountain, sometimes called the "Oriental Alpine," is approximately 230 km (140 mi) away from downtown Chengdu, and is composed of four adjacent peaks of the Traversal Mountain Range. Among the four peaks, the fourth and highest stands 6,250 m (20,510 ft) above sea level, and is perpetually covered by snow.

=== Culture of poetry and the Three Kingdoms ===
==== Wuhou Shrine ====
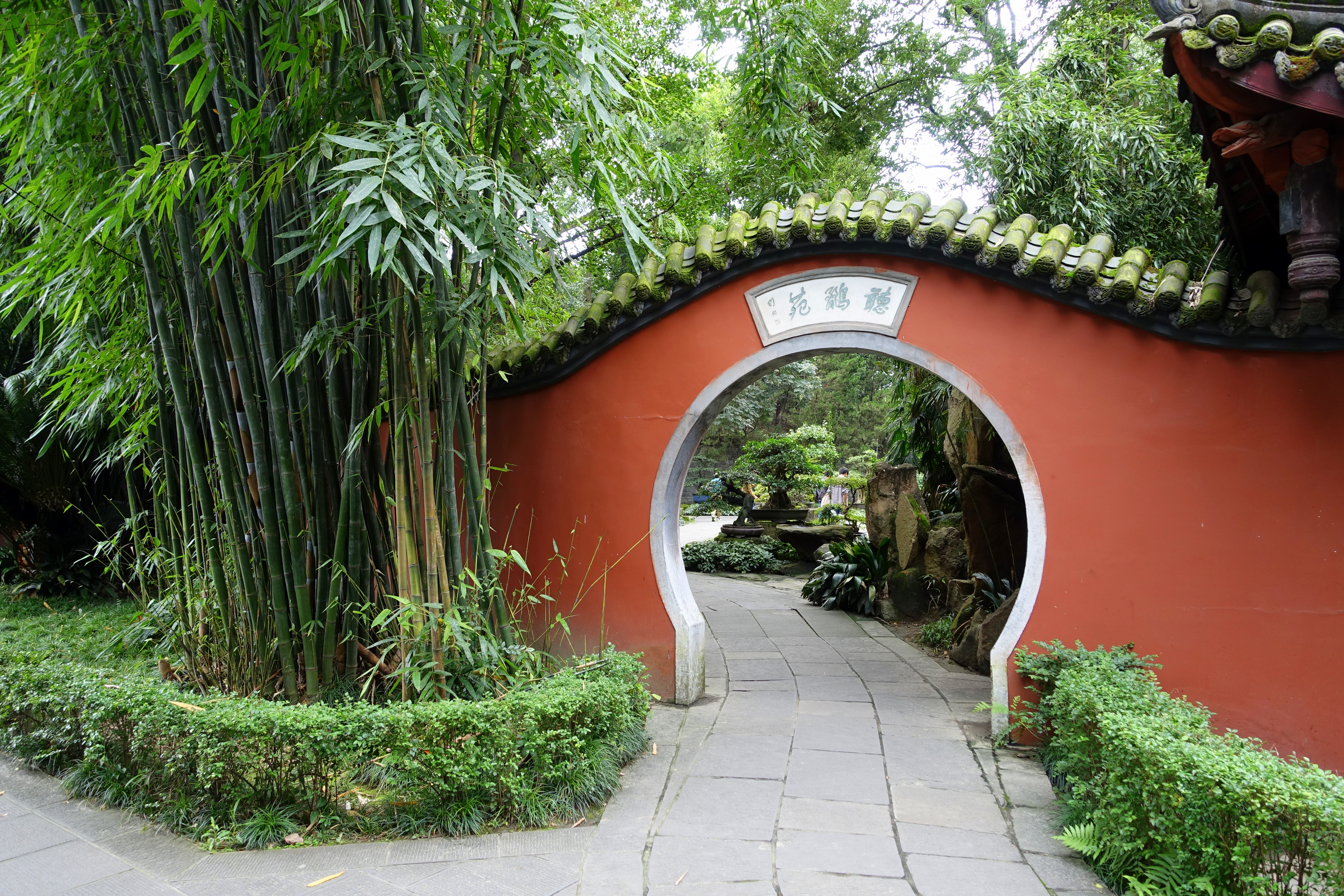
Wuhou Shrine gateway

Wuhou Shrine (Temple of Marquis Wu; 武侯祠) is perhaps the most influential museum of Three Kingdoms relics in China. It was built in the Western Jin period (265–316) in honor of Zhuge Liang, the famous military and political strategist who was Prime Minister of the Shu Han State during the Three Kingdoms period (220–280). The Shrine features the Zhuge Liang Memorial Temple and the Hall of Liu Bei (founder of the Shu Han state), along with statues of other historical figures of Shu Han and cultural relics such as stone inscriptions and tablets. The Huiling Mausoleum of Liu Bei represents a unique pattern of enshrining both the emperor and his subjects in the same temple, a rarity in China.

==== Du Fu thatched cottage ====
Du Fu was one of the most noted Tang dynasty poets; during the Lushan-Shi Siming Rebellion, he left Xi'an (then Chang'an) to take refuge in Chengdu. With the help of his friends, the thatched cottage was built along the Huanhua Stream in the west suburbs of Chengdu, where Du Fu spent four years of his life and produced more than 240 now-famous poems. During the Song dynasty, people began constructing gardens and halls on the site of his thatched cottage to honor his life and memory. Currently, a series of memorial buildings representing Du Fu's humble life stand on the riverbank, along with a large collection of relics and various editions of his poems.

=== Ancient Shu civilization ===
==== Jinsha Site ====
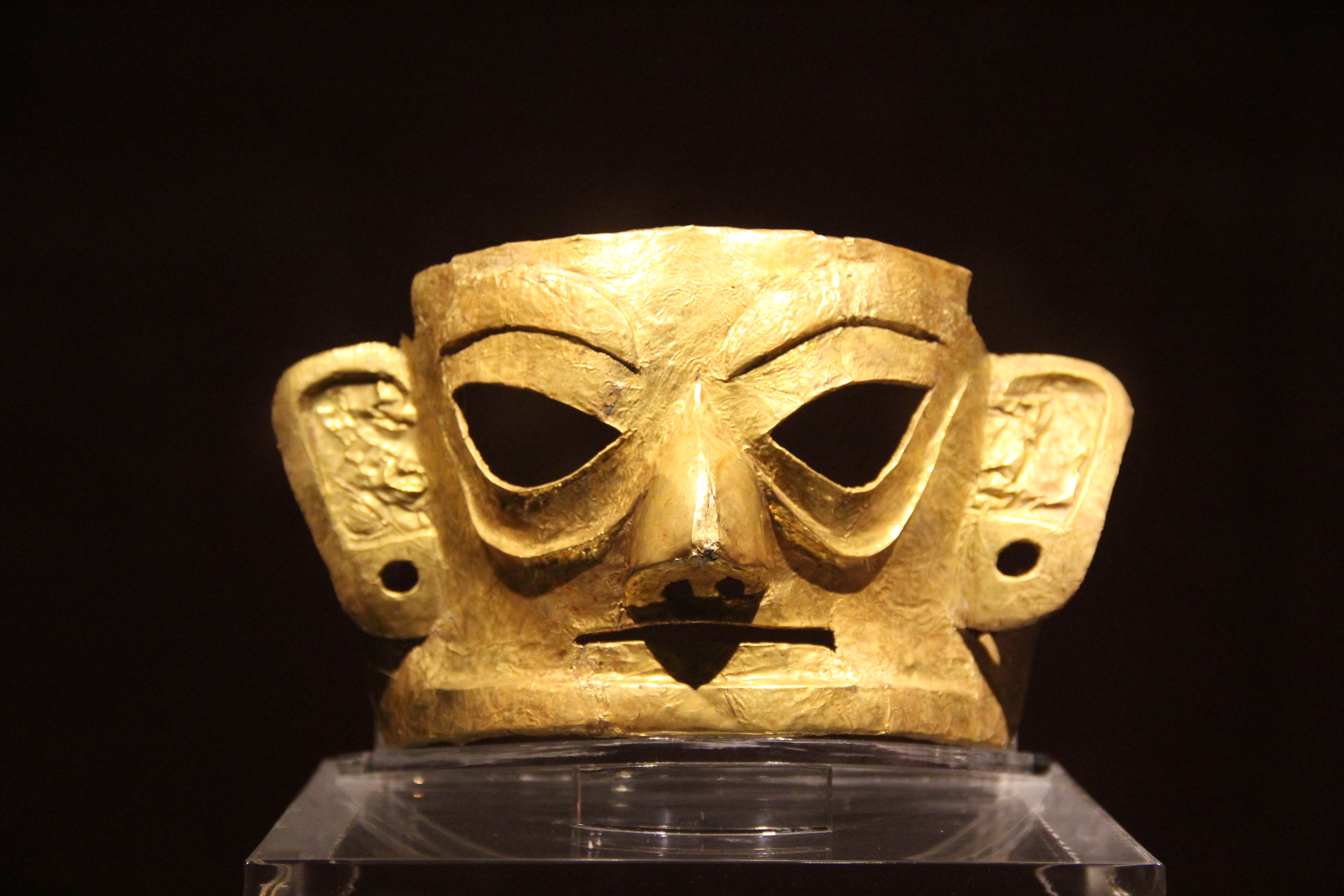
Jinsha gold mask

The Jinsha Site is the first significant archeological discovery in China of the 21st century and was selected in 2006 as a "key conservation unit" of the nation. The Jinsha Relics Museum is located in the northwest of Chengdu, about 5 km (3.1 mi) from downtown. As a theme-park-style museum, it is for the protection, research, and display of Jinsha archaeological relics and findings. The museum covers 300,000 m^{2} (3,200,000 sq ft), and houses relics, exhibitions, and a conservation center.

==== Golden Sun Bird ====
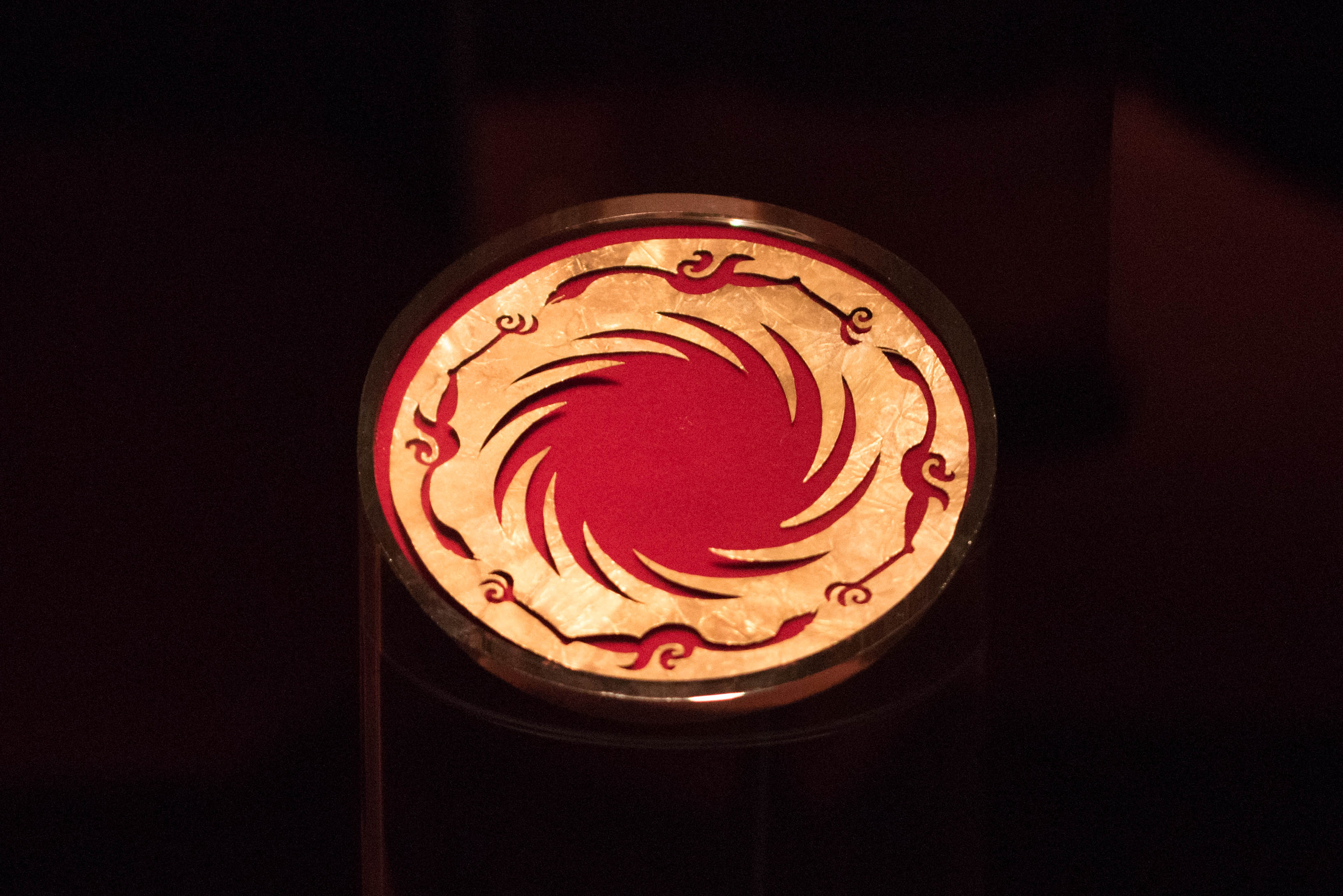
The Golden Sun Bird

Archaeologists from the Jinsha Ruins excavated the Golden Sun Bird on 25 February 2001. In 2005, it was designated as the official logo of Chinese cultural heritage by the China National Relic Bureau.

The round, foil plaque dates back to the ancient Shu region in 210 BC and is 94.2 percent pure gold, making it extremely thin. It contains four birds flying around the perimeter, representing the four seasons and directions. The sun-shaped cutout in the center contains 12 sunlight beams, each representing one of the 12 months of the year. The exquisite design is remarkable for a 2,200-year-old piece.

==== Sanxingdui Museum ====
Situated in the northeast of the state-protected Sanxingdui Site, the original complex of Sanxingdui Museum was founded in August 1992 and opened in 1997. It is the representative work of the master architect Zheng Guoying. The original museum covers 1,000 acres and was included in the first batch of national first-class museums.

The new Sanxingdui Museum complex was founded in March 2022. It covers an area of 54,400 square meters, which is about 5 times the size of the old museum. It was built for new cultural relics after major archaeological excavations. It displays more than 2,000 precious cultural relics such as bronze, jade, gold, pottery, and bone, and comprehensively and systematically displays the archaeological excavations and latest research results of Sanxingdui.

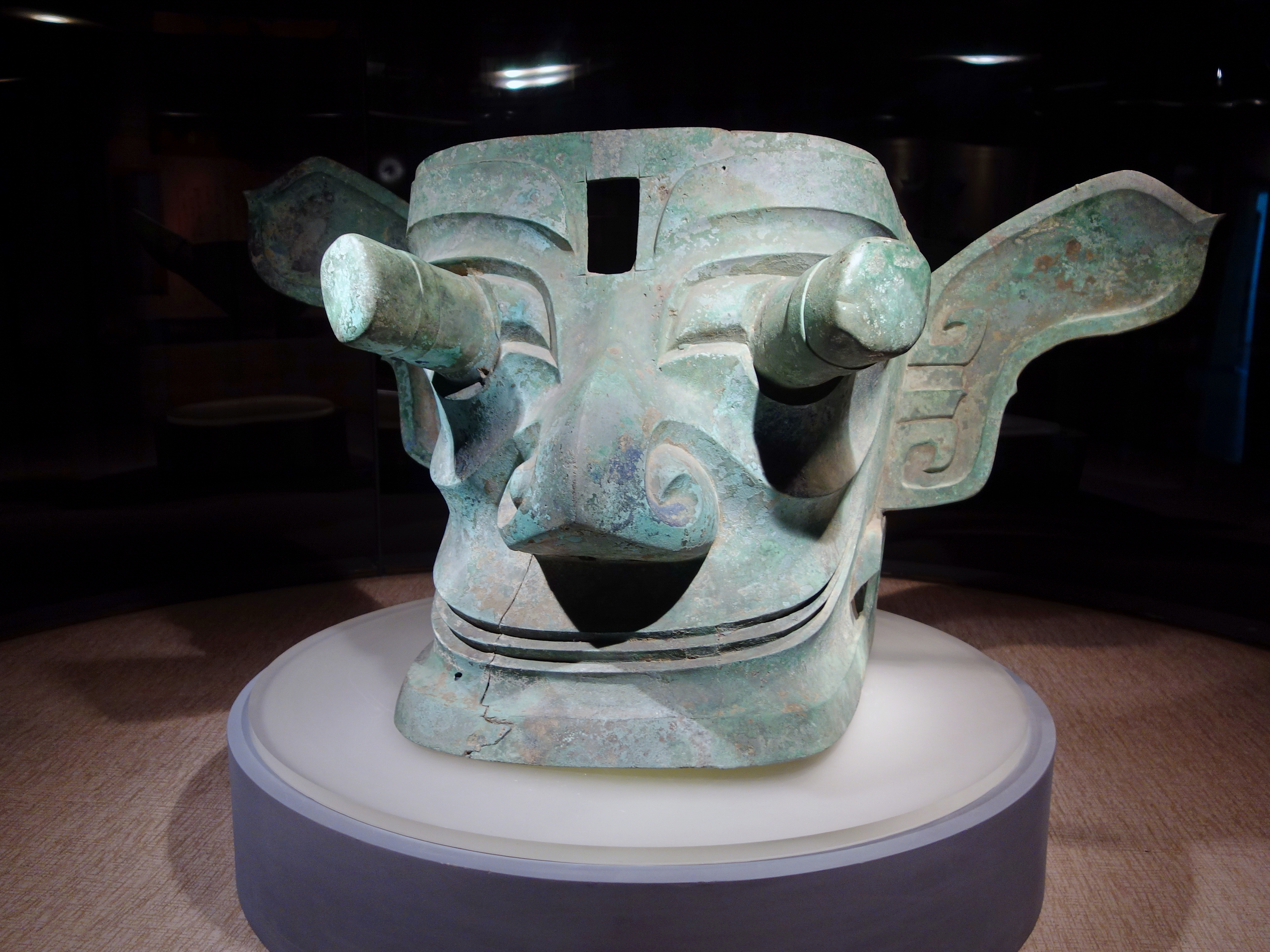
Sanxingdui bronze head

The main collection highlights the Ancient City of Chengdu, the Shu State & its culture, while displaying thousands of valuable relics, including earthenware, jade wares, bone objects, gold wares, and bronzes unearthed from Shang dynasty sacrificial sites.

=== Buddhist and Taoist culture ===
==== Daci Temple ====
The Daci Temple (大慈寺), a temple in downtown Chengdu, was first built during the Wei and Jin dynasties, with its cultural height during the Tang and Song dynasties. Xuanzang, a Tang dynasty monk, was initiated into monkhood and studied for several years here; during this time, he gave frequent sermons in Daci Monastery.

Wenshu Monastery

==== Wenshu Monastery ====
Also known as Xinxiang Monastery, Wenshu Monastery (文殊院) is Chengdu's best-preserved Buddhist temple. Originally built during the Tang dynasty, it has a history of 1,300 years. Parts of Xuanzang's skull are held in consecration here (as a relic). The traditional home of scholar Li Wenjing is on the outskirts of the complex.

==== Baoguang Buddhist Temple ====
Located in Xindu District, Baoguang Buddhist Temple (宝光寺) enjoys a long history and a rich collection of relics. It is believed to have been constructed during the East Han period and to have appeared in written records from the Tang dynasty onward. It was destroyed during the Ming dynasty in the early 16th century. In 1607, the ninth year of the reign of the Kangxi Emperor of the Qing dynasty, it was rebuilt.

==== Qingyang Palace ====
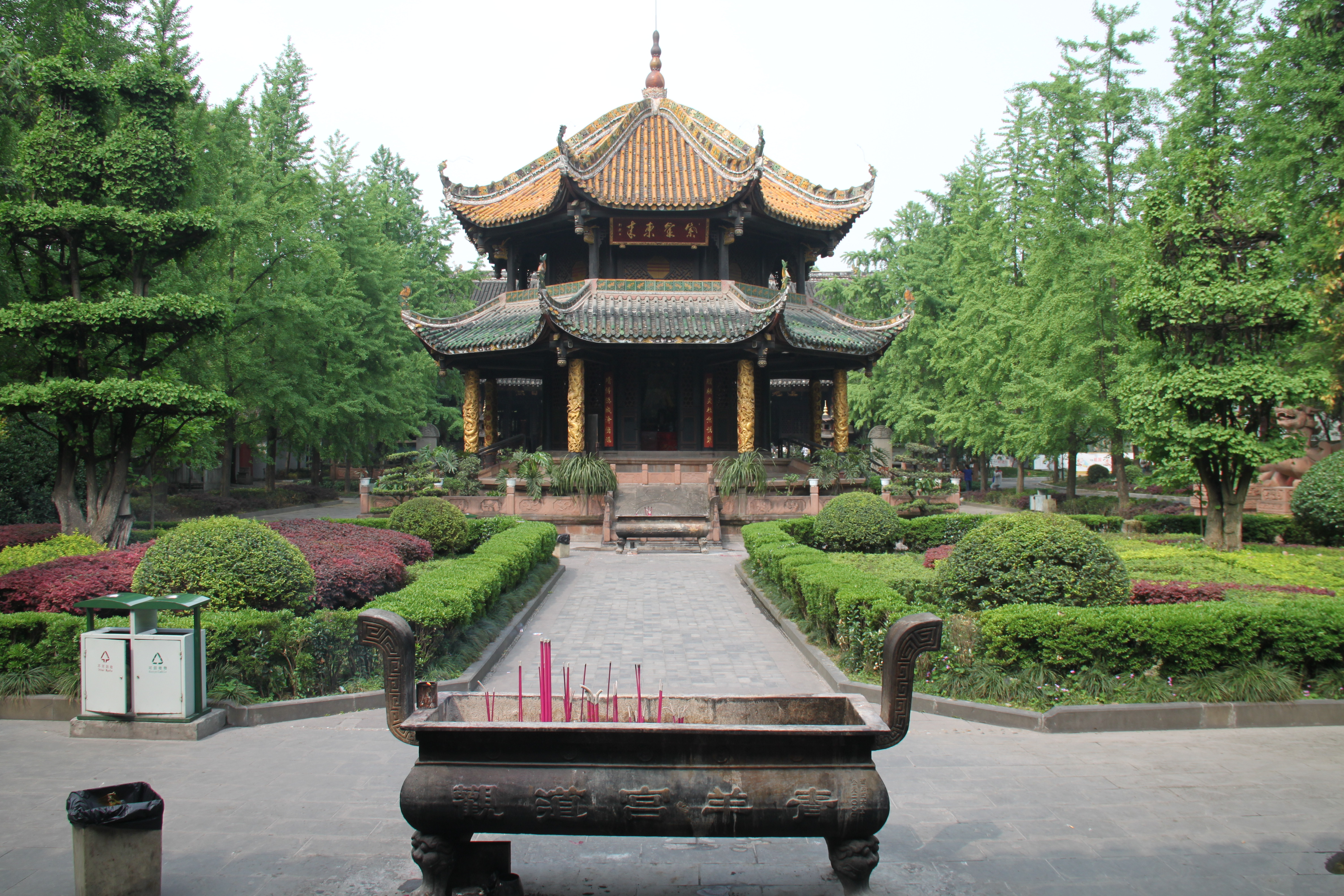
Qingyang Palace

Located in the western part of Chengdu, Qingyang Palace (青羊宫) is not only the largest and oldest Taoist temple in the city, but also the largest Taoist temple in Southwestern China. The only existing copy of the Daozang Jiyao (a collection of classic Taoist scriptures) is preserved in the temple.

According to history, Qingyang Temple was the place where Lao Tzu preached his famous Dao De Jing to his disciple, Ying Xi.

=== Featured streets and historic towns ===
==== Kuanzhaixiangzi Alleys ====
Kuanzhaixiangzi Alleys (宽窄巷子) were first built during the Qing dynasty for Manchu soldiers. The lanes remained residential until 2003, when the local government turned the area into a mixed-use strip of restaurants, teahouses, bars, avant-garde galleries, and residential houses. Historic architecture has been well preserved in the Wide and Narrow lanes.

==== Jinli ====
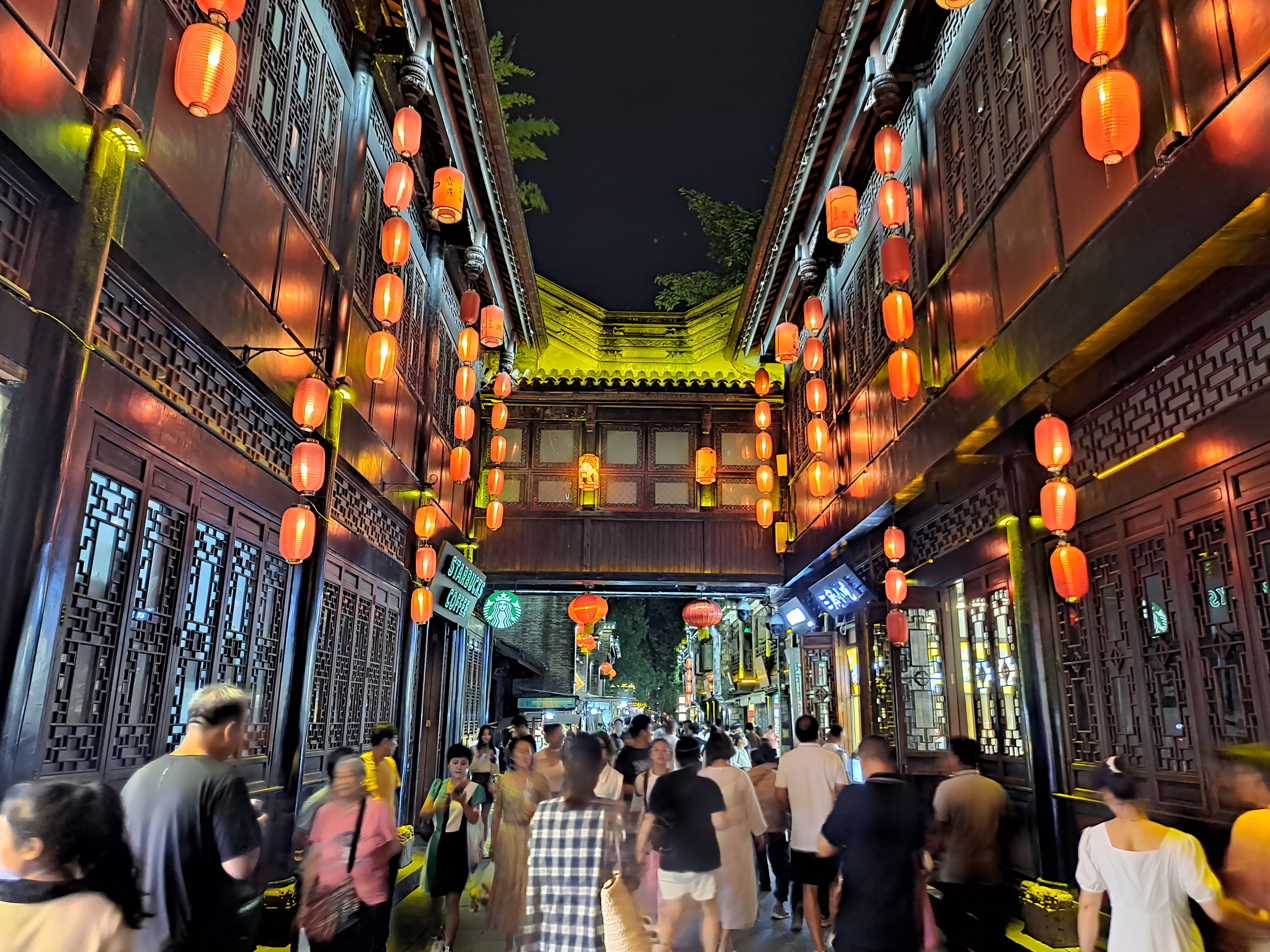
Jinli Street at night

Nearby Wuhou Shrine, Jinli is a popular commercial and dining area that reflects the traditional architecture of western Sichuan. "Jinli" (锦里) is the name of an old street in Chengdu dating from the Han dynasty and means "making perfection more perfect."

The ancient Jinli Street was one of the oldest and most commercialized streets in the history of the Shu state and was well known throughout the country during the Qin, Han, and Three Kingdoms periods. Many aspects of Chengdu's urban life are present in the current-day Jinli area: teahouses, restaurants, bars, theaters, handicraft stores, local snack vendors, and specialty shops.

==== Huanglongxi Historic Town ====
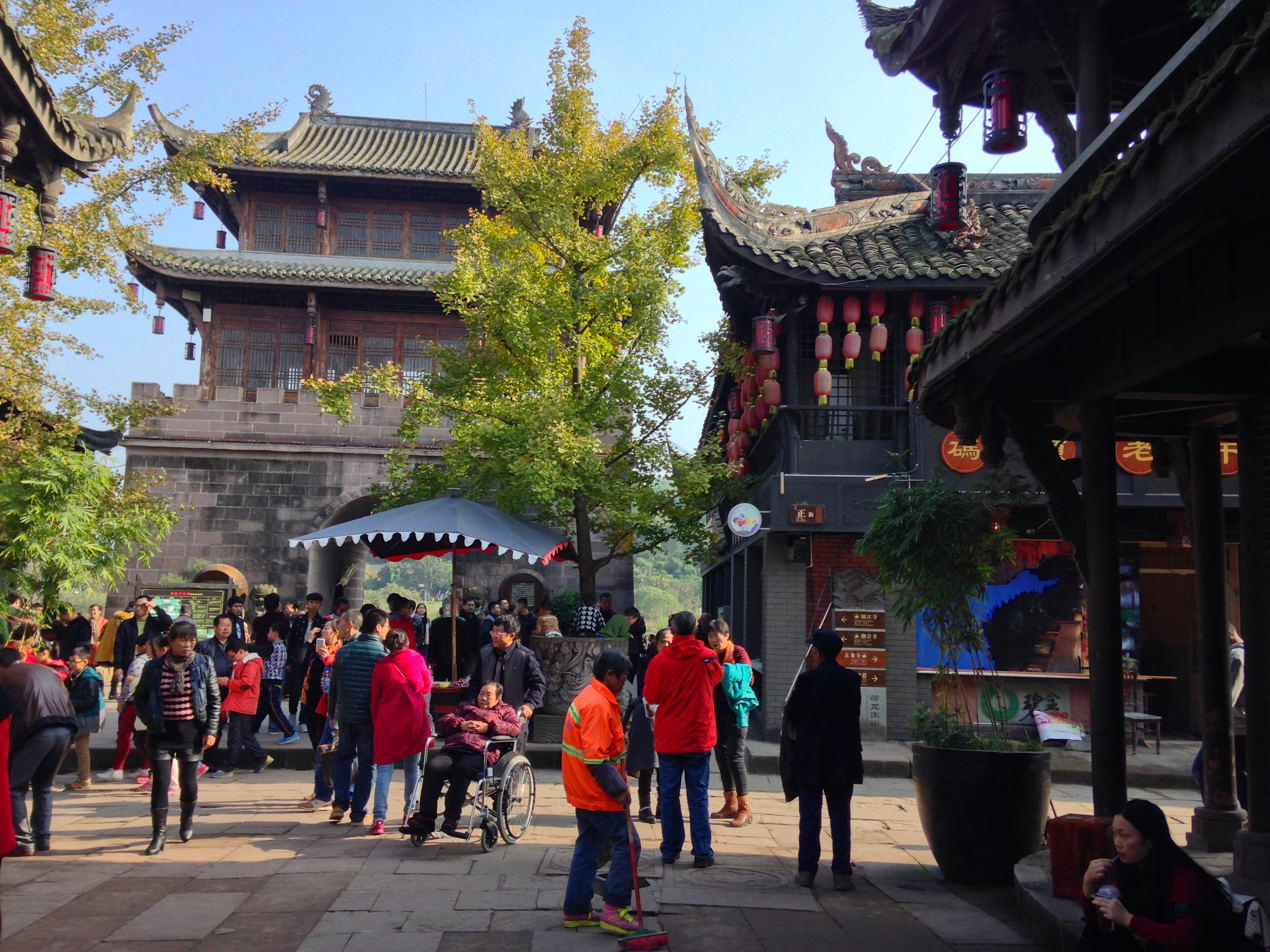
Huanglongxi Historic Town

Facing the Jinjiang River to the east and leaning against Muma Mountain to the north, the ancient town of Huanglongxi is approximately 40 km (25 mi) southeast of Chengdu. It was a large military stronghold for the ancient Shu Kingdom. The head of the Shu Han State in the Three Kingdoms period was seated in Huanglongxi. For some time, the general government offices for Renshou, Pengshan, and Huayang counties were also located here. The ancient town has preserved the Qing dynasty architectural style, as seen in its street, shop, and building designs.

==== Chunxi Road ====
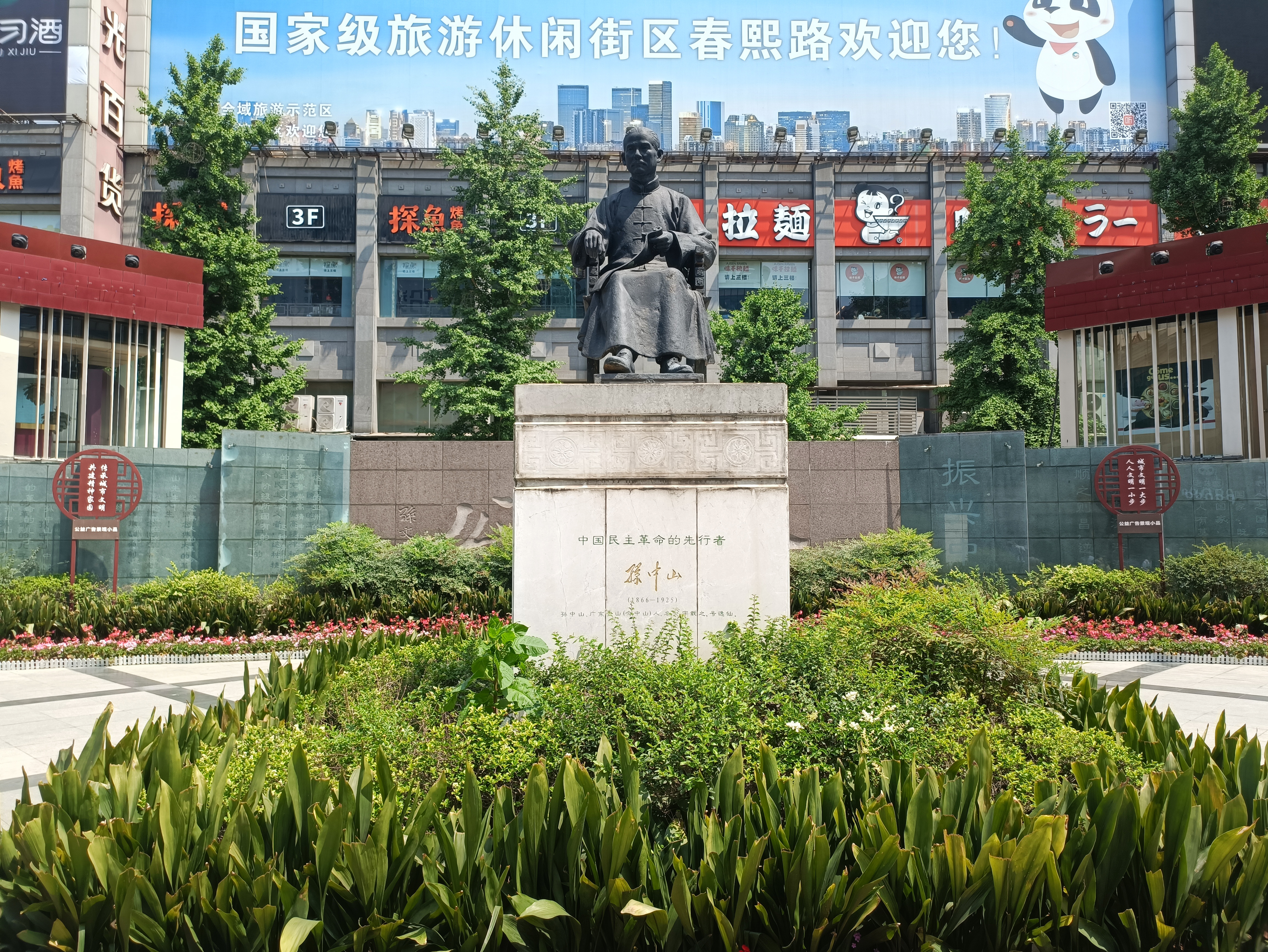
Dr. Sun Yat-sen Square at Chunxi Road

Located in downtown Chengdu, Chunxi Road (Chinese: 春熙路) is a trendy, bustling commercial strip with a long history. It was built in 1924 and named after a passage from the Tao Te Ching. Today, it is one of the most well-known and popular fashion and shopping centers of Chengdu, lined with shopping malls, luxury brand stores, and boutique shops.

==== Anren Historic Town ====
Anren Historic Town is located 39 km (24 mi) west of Chengdu. It was the hometown of Liu Wencai, a Qing dynasty warlord, landowner, and millionaire. His 27 historic mansions have been well preserved and turned into museums. Three old streets built during the Republic of China period are still in use by residents today—museums in Anren house a rich collection of more than 8 million relics and artifacts. A museum dedicated to the 2008 Sichuan earthquake was built in 2010.

==== Luodai Historic Town ====
Luodai was built, like many historic structures in the area, during the Three Kingdoms period. According to legend, the Shu Han emperor Liu Shan dropped his jade belt into a well when he passed through this small town. Thus, the town was named 'lost belt' (Chinese: 落带). It later evolved into its current name Chinese: 洛带 with the same pronunciation, but a different first character.

Luodai Historic Town is one of the five major Hakka settlements in China. Three or four hundred years ago, a group of Hakka people moved from coastal cities to Luodai. It has since grown into the largest community for Hakka people.

== Economy ==
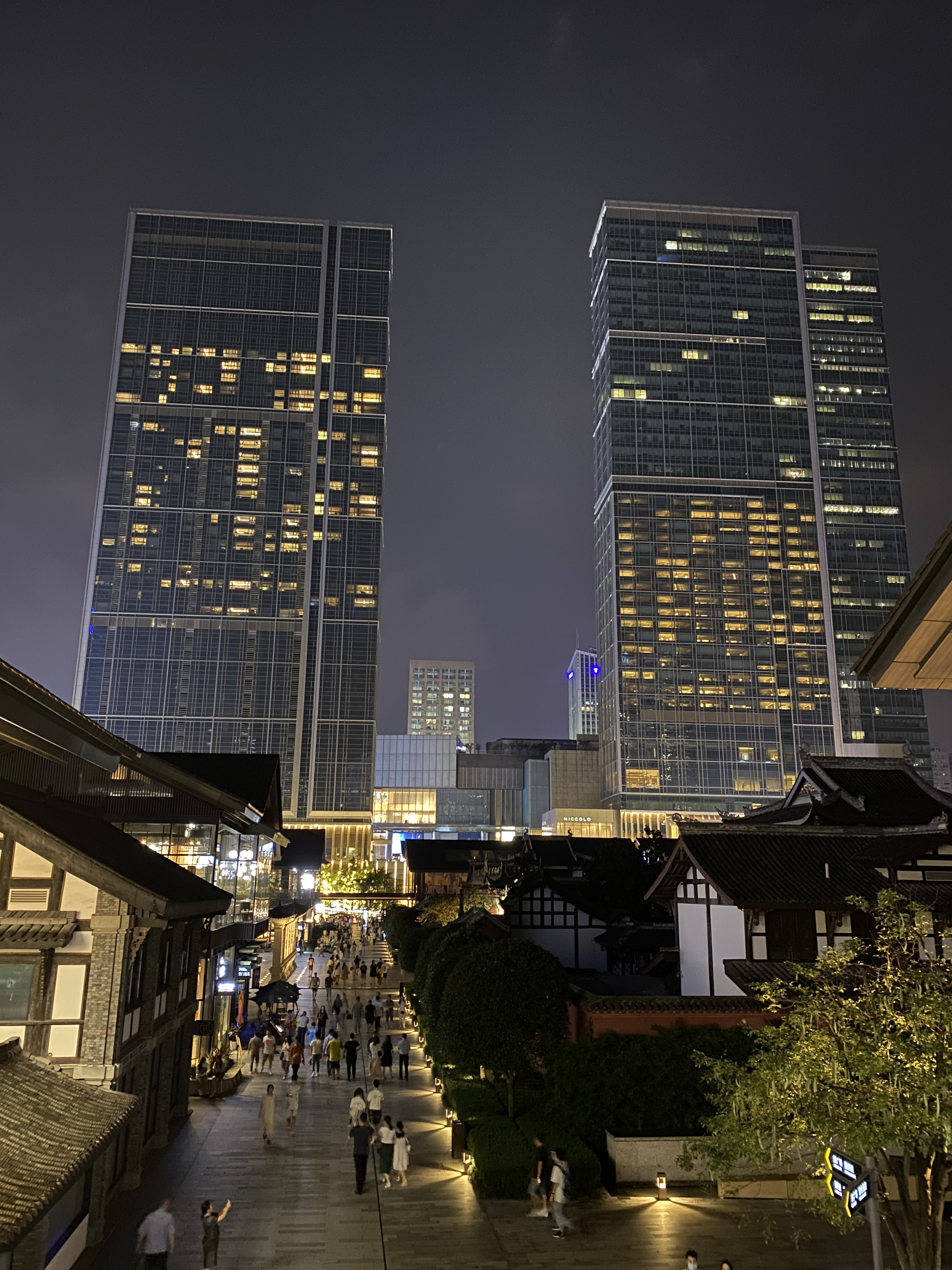
Taikoo Li and IFS, downtown Chengdu

China's state council has designated Chengdu as the country's western center of logistics, commerce, finance, science and technology, as well as a hub of transportation and communication. It is also an important base for manufacturing and agriculture.

According to the World Bank's 2007 survey report on global investment environments, Chengdu was declared "a benchmark city for investment environment in inland China."

Also based on a research report undertaken by the Nobel economics laureate, Dr. Robert Mundell and the celebrated Chinese economist, Li Yining, published by the State Information Center in 2010, Chengdu has become an "engine" of the Western Development Program, a benchmark city for investment environment in inland China, and a major leader in new urbanization.

In 2010, 12 of the Fortune 500 companies, including ANZ Bank, Nippon Steel Corporation, and Electricité de France, opened offices, branches, or operation centers in Chengdu, the largest number in recent years. Meanwhile, the Fortune 500 companies that have opened offices in Chengdu, including JP Morgan Chase, Henkel, and GE, increased their investment and upgraded the involvement of their branches in Chengdu. By the end of 2010, over 200 Fortune 500 companies had set up branches in Chengdu, ranking it first among Central and Western China cities in terms of the number of Fortune 500 companies. Of these, 149 are foreign enterprises, and 40 are domestic companies.

According to the 2010 AmCham China White Paper on the State of American Business in China, Chengdu has become a top investment destination in China.

The main industries in Chengdu—including machinery, automobile, medicine, food, and information technology—are supported by numerous large-scale enterprises. In addition, an increasing number of high-tech enterprises from outside Chengdu have also settled down there. Chengdu is becoming one of the favorite cities for investment in Central and Western China. Among the world's 500 largest companies, 133 multinational enterprises have had subsidiaries or branch offices in Chengdu by October 2009. These MNEs include Intel, Cisco, Sony and Toyota that have assembly and manufacturing bases, as well as Motorola, Ericsson, and Microsoft that have R&D centers in Chengdu. The National Development and Reform Commission has formally approved Chengdu's proposed establishment of a national bio-industry base there. The government of Chengdu had unveiled a plan to create a 90-billion-CNY bio pharmaceutical sector by 2012. China's aviation industries have begun construction of a high-tech industrial park in the city that will feature space and aviation technology. The local government plans to attract overseas and domestic companies for service outsourcing and become a well-known service outsourcing base in China and worldwide.

Chunxi Road

In the middle of the 2000s, the city expanded urban infrastructure and services to nearby rural communities in an effort to improve rural living conditions.

=== Electronics and IT industries ===
Chengdu has long been an established national hub for the electronics and IT industries. Chengdu's growth accelerated alongside China's domestic telecom services sector, which, along with India's, accounts for over 70 percent of the world's telecommunications market. Several key national electronics R&D institutes are located in Chengdu. Chengdu Hi-tech Industrial Development Zone has attracted a variety of multinationals, at least 30 Fortune 500 companies and 12,000 domestic companies, including Intel, IBM, Cisco, Nokia, Motorola, SAP, Siemens, Canon, HP, Xerox, Microsoft, Tieto, NIIT, MediaTek, and Wipro, as well as domestic powerhouses such as Lenovo. Dell opened its second major China operations center in 2011 in Chengdu as its center in Xiamen expands in 2010.

Intel Capital acquired a strategic stake in Primetel, Chengdu's first foreign technology company in 2001. Intel's Chengdu factory, set up in 2005 is its second in China, after its Shanghai factory, and the first such large-scale foreign investment in the electronics industry in interior mainland China. Intel, the world's largest chipmaker, has invested US$600 million in two assembly and testing facilities in Chengdu. Following the footsteps of Intel, Semiconductor Manufacturing International Corporation (SMIC), the world's third largest foundry, set up an assembly and testing plant in Chengdu in 2006. AMD, Intel's rival, had set up an R&D center in this city in 2008.

In November 2006, IBM signed an agreement with the Chengdu High-Tech Zone to establish a Global Delivery Center, its fourth in China after Dalian, Shanghai, and Shenzhen, within the Chengdu Tianfu Software Park. Scheduled to be operational by February 2007, this new center will provide multilingual application development and maintenance services to clients globally in English, Japanese and Chinese, and to the IBM Global Procurement Center, recently located to the southern Chinese city of Shenzhen. On 23 March 2008, IBM announced at the "West China Excellent Enterprises CEO Forum" that the southwest working team of IBM Global Business Services is now formally stationed in Chengdu. On 28 May 2008, Zhou Weikun, president of IBM China, disclosed that IBM Chengdu would increase its staff number from the present 600 to nearly 1,000 by the end of the year.

In July 2019, Amazon Web Services, the cloud computing company, signed a deal with the Chengdu High-Tech Zone to establish an innovation center. This project was intended to attract international businesses and enterprises to the area, promote cloud computing in China, and develop artificial intelligence technologies.

Chengdu is a major base for communication infrastructure, with one of China's nine top-level postal centers and one of six national telecom exchange hubs.

In 2009, Chengdu hosted the World Cyber Games Grand Finals (11–15 November). It was the first time China hosted the world's largest computer and video game tournament.

=== Financial industry ===
Chengdu is a leading financial hub in the Asia-Pacific region and ranks 35th globally and 6th in China (after Shanghai, Hong Kong, Beijing, Shenzhen and Guangzhou) in the 2021 Global Financial Centres Index. Chengdu has attracted a large number of foreign financial institutions, including Citigroup, HSBC, Standard Chartered Bank, JPMorgan Chase, ANZ and MUFG Bank.

ANZ's data services center, established in 2011 in Chengdu, employs over 800 people. In March 2019, the bank recruited further staff to support its data analytics and big data efforts. In 2020, ANZ temporarily repurposed its Chengdu data center to an IT helpdesk, as part of the bank's pandemic response.

Historically, Chengdu has marked its name in the history of financial innovation. The world's first paper currency 'Jiao Zi' was seen in Chengdu in the year 1023, during the Song dynasty.

Now, Chengdu is not only the gateway of Western China for foreign financial institutions, but also a popular town for Chinese domestic financial firms. The Chinese monetary authority, People's Bank of China (China's central bank), set its southwestern China headquarters in Chengdu City. In addition, almost all domestic banks and securities brokerage firms located their regional headquarters or branches in At the same time, the local financial firms of Chengdu are strengthening their presences nationally, notably, Huaxi Securities, Sinolink Securities, and Bank of Chengdu. Moreover, in addition to banks and brokerage firms, the city's expanding local economy attracted more financial service firms to capitalize on the economic growth. Grant Thornton, KPMG, PWC and Ernst & Young are the four global accountants and business advisers with Western China head offices in the city.

It is expected that by 2012, value-added financial services will account for 14 percent of the added-value services industry and 7 percent of regional GDP. By 2015, those figures are expected to grow to 18 percent and 9 percent, respectively.

=== Modern logistic industry ===
Because of its logistic infrastructure, professional network, and resources in science, technology, and communication, Chengdu has become home to 43 foreign-funded logistic enterprises, including UPS, TNT, DHL, and Maersk, as well as several well-known domestic logistic enterprises, including COSCO, CSCL, SINOTRANS, CRE, Transfar Group, South Logistic Group, YCH, and STO. By 2012, the logistics industry in Chengdu will achieve RMB 50 billion in value-added, with average annual growth exceeding 18 percent. Ten new international direct flights will be in service; five railways will operate five scheduled block container trains; and 50 large logistics enterprises are expected to have annual operating revenue exceeding RMB 100 million.

=== Modern business and trade ===
Chengdu is the largest trade center in western China, with a market that covers all of Sichuan province and exerts influence on six provinces, cities, and districts. Chengdu ranks first among cities in western China in terms of the scale of foreign investment in commerce and trade. By 2012, total retail sales of consumer goods in Chengdu reached RMB 331.77 billion, up 16 percent annually on average.

=== Convention and exhibition industry ===
Boasting the claim of being "China's Famous Exhibition City" and "China's Most Competitive Convention and Exhibition City", Chengdu leads central and western China in the scale of its convention economy. It has been recognized as one of the three largest convention and exhibition cities in China. In 2010, direct revenue from the convention and exhibition industry was RMB 3.21 billion, with a year-on-year growth of 27.8 percent. The growth reached a historical high.

=== Software and service outsourcing industry ===
In 2006, Chengdu was listed as one of the first service outsourcing base cities in China by the Ministry of Science and Technology. Among the Top 10 service outsourcing enterprises in the world, Accenture, IBM, and Wipro are based in Chengdu. In addition, 20 international enterprises including Motorola, Ubi Soft Entertainment, and Agilent, have set up internal shared service centers or R&D centers in Chengdu. Maersk Global Document Processing Center and Logistic Processing Sub-center, DHL Chengdu Service Center, Financial Accounting Center for DHL China, and Siemens Global IT Operation Center will be put into operation. In 2010, offshore service outsourcing in Chengdu realized a registered contract value of US$336 million, 99 percent higher than the previous year.

=== New energy industry ===
Chengdu was granted the title "National High-Tech Industry Base for New Energy Industry" (新能源产业国家高技术产业基地) by the National Development and Reform Commission. Chengdu ranked first again in the list of China's 15 "Cities with Highest Investment Value for New Energies" released at the beginning of 2011. Shuangliu County, under its jurisdiction, entered "2010 China's Top 100 Counties of New Energies". In 2012, Chengdu's new energy industry reached an investment over 20 billion RMB and sales revenue of 50 billion RMB.

=== Electronics and information industry ===
Chengdu is home to the most competitive IT industry cluster in western China, an important integrated circuit industry base in China, and one of the five major national software industry bases.

Manufacturing chains are already formed in integrated circuits, optoelectronics displays, digital video & audio, optical communication products, and original-equipment products of electronic terminals, including companies as IBM, Intel, Texas Instruments, Microsoft, Motorola, Nokia, Ericsson, Dell, Lenovo, Foxconn, Compal, and Wistron.

=== Automobile industry ===
Chengdu has built a comprehensive automotive industry system. It has preliminarily formed an integrated system encompassing trade, exhibitions, entertainment, R&D, and the manufacturing of spare parts and whole vehicles (e.g., sedans, coaches, sport utility vehicles, trucks, special vehicles). There are whole-vehicle makers, such as Dongfeng-PSA (Peugeot-Citroën), Volvo, FAW-Volkswagen, FAW-Toyota, Yema, and Sinotruk Wangpai, as well as nearly 200 core parts makers covering German, Japanese, and other vehicle lines.

In 2011, Volvo announced that its first manufacturing base in China, with an investment of RMB 5.4 billion, would be built in Chengdu. By 2015, the automobile production capacity of Chengdu's Comprehensive Function Zone of Automobile Industry is expected to reach 700,000 vehicles and 1.25 million in 2020.

=== Modern agriculture ===
Chengdu enjoys favorable agricultural conditions and rich natural resources. It is an important base for high-quality agricultural products. Chengdu is home to a national commercial grain and edible oil production base, a vegetable and food supply base, a key agricultural products processing center, and a logistics distribution center for western China.

=== Defense industry ===
Chengdu is home to many defense companies, such as the Chengdu Aircraft Company, which produces the recently declassified J-10 Vigorous Dragon combat aircraft as well as the JF-17 Thunder, in a joint collaborative effort with Pakistan Air Force. Chengdu Aircraft Company has also developed the J-20 Mighty Dragon stealth fighter. The company is one of the major manufacturers of Chinese Military aviation technology.

=== Industrial zones ===
==== Chengdu Hi-tech Comprehensive Free Trade Zone ====
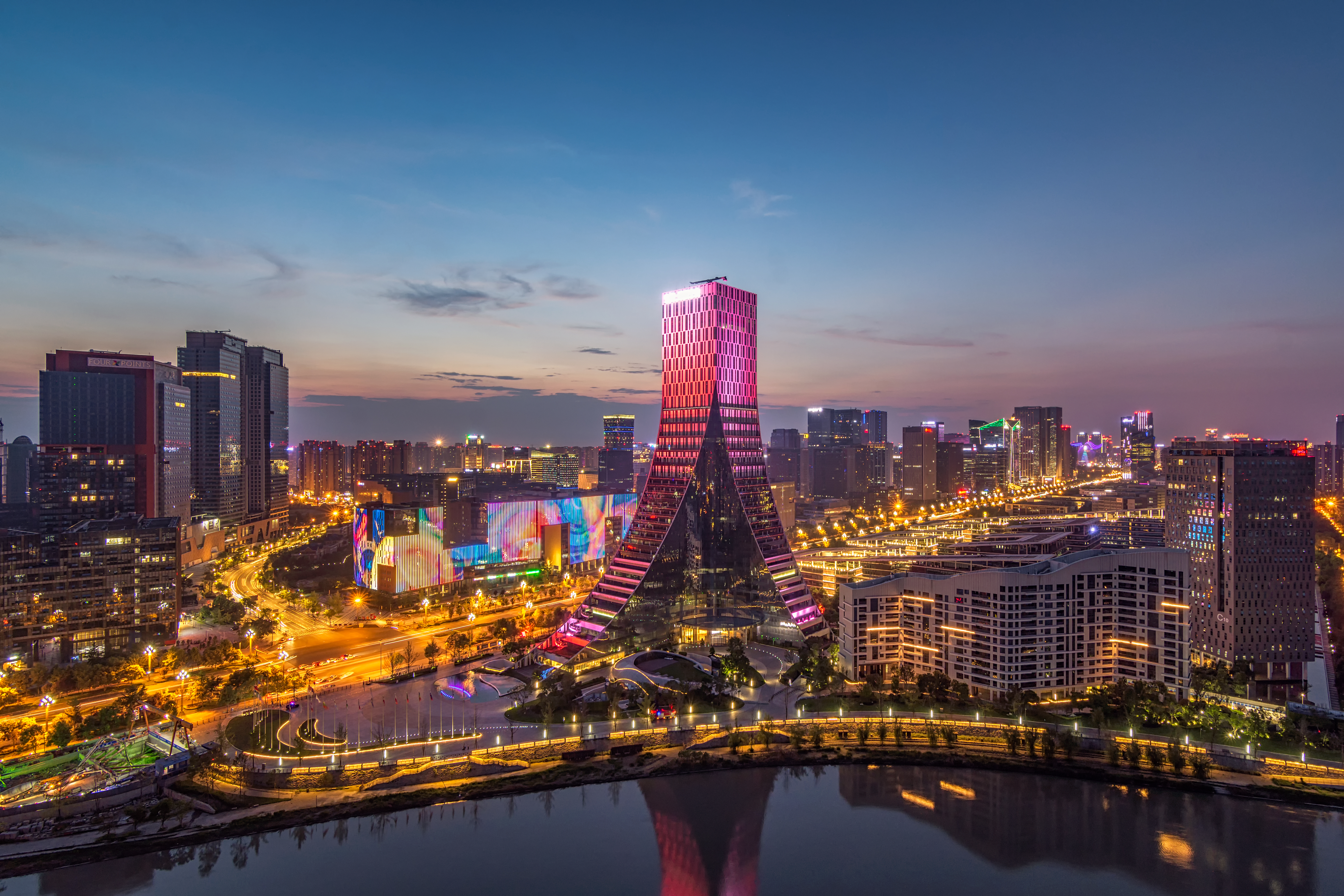
Chengdu Hi-Tech Industrial Development Zone

Chengdu Hi-tech Comprehensive Free Trade Zone was established with the approval of the State Council on 18 October 2010 and passed the national acceptance on 25 February 2011. It was officially operated in May 2011. Chengdu High-tech Comprehensive Free Trade Zone is integrated and expanded from the former Chengdu Export Processing Zone and Chengdu Bonded Logistics Center. It is located in the Chengdu West High-tech Industrial Development Zone, covering 4.68 square kilometers and divided into three areas: A, B, and C. The industry focuses on notebook computer manufacturing, tablet computer manufacturing, wafer manufacturing, chip packaging testing, electronic components, precision machining, and the biopharmaceutical industry. Chengdu Hi-Tech Comprehensive Free Trade Zone has attracted top 500 and multinational enterprises including as Intel, Foxconn, Texas Instruments, Dell, and Morse.

In 2020, the Chengdu Hi-Tech Comprehensive Free Trade Zone achieved a total import and export volume of 549.1 billion yuan (including the Shuangliu Sub-zone), accounting for 68% of the province's total foreign trade, and ranking No. 1 among national comprehensive free trade zones for three consecutive years.

==== Chengdu National Cross-Strait Technology Industry Development Park ====
This was established in 1992 as the Chengdu Taiwanese Investment Zone.

== Transport ==
=== Air ===
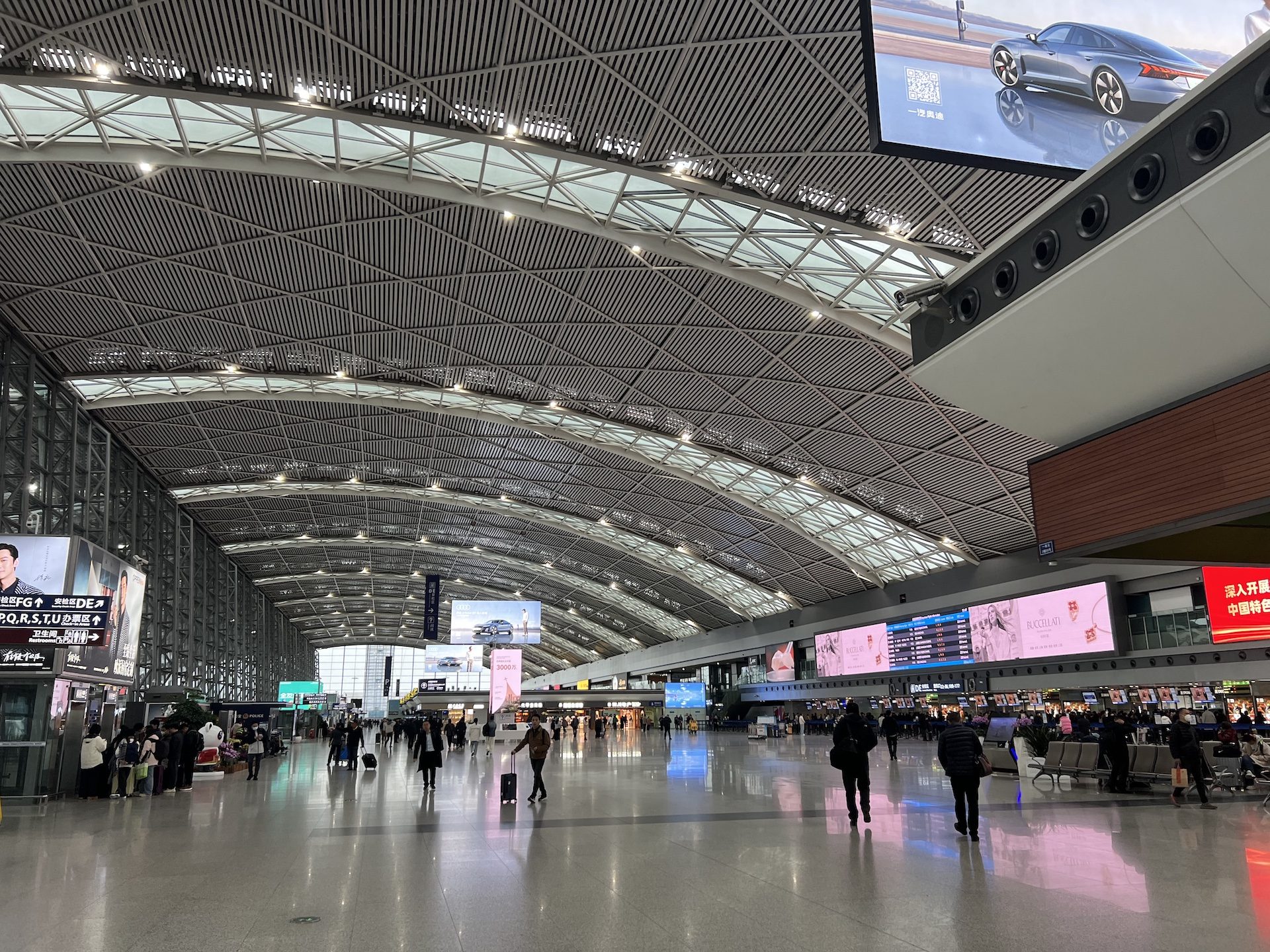
Terminal 2 Concourse, Chengdu Shuangliu International Airport

Chengdu is the third Chinese city with two international airports (Chengdu Shuangliu International Airport and Chengdu Tianfu International Airport) after Beijing and Shanghai. Chengdu Shuangliu International Airport (IATA: CTU, ICAO: ZUUU) is located in Shuangliu District 16 km (9.9 mi) southwest of downtown. Chengdu Shuangliu International Airport is the busiest airport in Central and Western China and the nation's fourth-busiest in 2018, with a total of 53 million passengers.

Chengdu airports (including Shuangliu International Airport and Tianfu International Airport) is also a 240-hour visa-free transit port for foreigners from 53 countries Besides, Chengdu airports also offer 24-hour visa-free transit for most nationals when having a stopover in Chengdu.

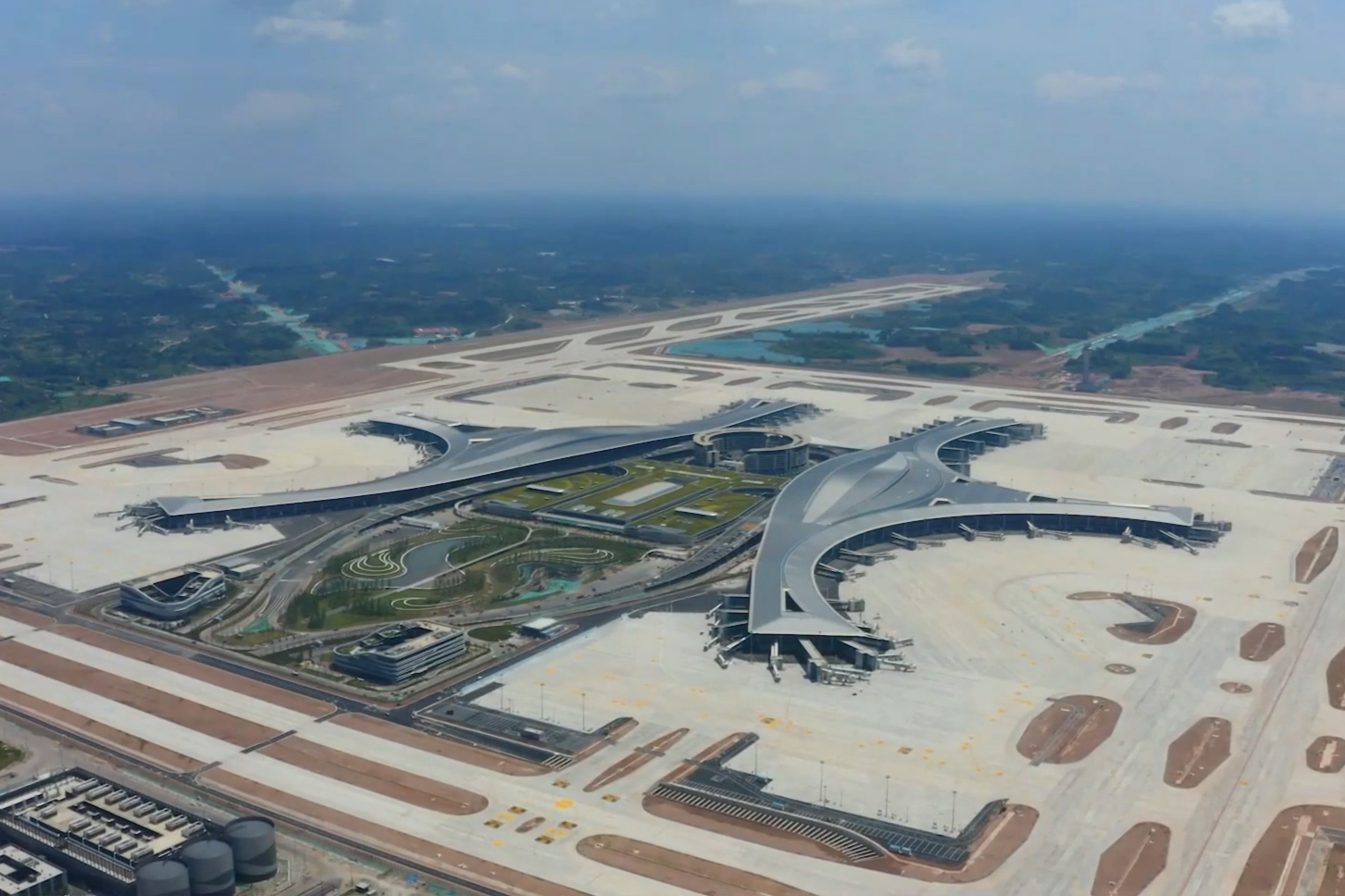
Chengdu Tianfu International Airport

Chengdu Shuangliu International Airport has two runways and is capable of operating the Airbus A380, currently the largest passenger aircraft in operation. Chengdu is the fourth city in China with two commercial-use runways, after Beijing, Shanghai, and Guangzhou. On 26 May 2009, Air China, the Chengdu City Government, and the Sichuan Airport Group signed an agreement to improve airport infrastructure and increase the number of direct international flights to and from Chengdu. The objective is to increase passenger traffic to more than 40 million by 2015, making Chengdu Shuangliu International Airport the fourth-largest international hub in China, after Beijing, Shanghai, and Guangzhou, and one of the top 30 largest airports in the world. Chengdu Shuangliu Airport ranked the No.1 and No.2 busiest airport in China in 2020 and 2021, respectively. The airport is currently operating only domestically.

A second international airport, the Chengdu Tianfu International Airport (IATA: TFU, ICAO: ZUTF), currently with two main terminals and three runways, opened in June 2021. The new airport is 51 kilometers (32 mi) southeast of the city and will have a capacity of 80–90 million passengers per year.

Since 2023, all international flights have been transferred to Tianfu International Airport.

=== Railway ===
Chengdu is the primary railway hub city and rail administrative center in southwestern China. The China Railway Chengdu Group manages the railway system of Sichuan Province, Chongqing City, and Guizhou Province. Chengdu has four main freight railway stations. Among them, Chengdu North Marshaling Station is one of the largest in Asia. Since April 2013, companies can ship goods three times a week (initially only once a week) to Europe on trains originating from Chengdu Qingbaijiang Station bound for Łódź, Poland. It is the first express cargo train linking China and Europe, taking 12 days to complete the full journey.

Four major passenger stations are servicing Chengdu: Chengdu railway station (commonly referred to as the "North Station"), Chengdu South railway station (ChengduNan Station), Chengdu East railway station (ChengduDong Station), and Chengdu West railway station (ChengduXi Station). Additionally, Chengdu Tianfu Station is under construction.

Chengdu is the terminus of Baoji–Chengdu railway, Chengdu–Chongqing railway, Sichuan–Qinghai railway (eventually connecting to Lanzhou), Chengdu–Dazhou railway, Shanghai–Wuhan–Chengdu high-speed railway, Sichuan–Qinghai railway, Xi'an–Chengdu high-speed railway, Chengdu–Guiyang high-speed railway, Chengdu–Yibin high-speed railway (eventually connecting to Kunming) and Chengdu–Dujiangyan intercity railway.

The Chengdu–Dujiangyan intercity railway is a high-speed rail line connecting Chengdu with the satellite city of Dujiangyan and the Mountain Qingcheng World Heritage Site. The line is 65 km (40 mi) in length with 15 stations. CRH1 train sets on the line reach a maximum speed of 220 km/h (140 mph) and complete the full trip in 30 minutes. The line was built in 18 months and entered operation on 12 May 2010.

=== Metropolitan expressways ===
Chengdu's transport network is well developed, and the city serves as the starting point for many national highways, with major routes running from Sichuan to Shanxi, Sichuan to Tibet, and Sichuan to Yunnan.

Several major road projects have been constructed: a 15 km (9.3 mi) tunnel from Shuangliu Taiping to Jianyang Sancha Lake; alteration of the National Expressway 321, from Jiangyang to Longquanyi. There will also be a road connecting Longquan Town to Longquan Lake; it connects to the Chengdu–Jianyang Expressway, shortening the journey by 10 km (6.2 mi). By the end of 2008, there were ten expressways connecting downtown Chengdu to its suburbs. The expressways include Chenglin Expressway, extensions of Guanghua Avenue and Shawan Line, and an expressway from Chengdu to Heilongtan.

The toll-free Chengjin Expressway in the east of Chengdu is 38.7 km (24.0 mi) long. It takes about 30 minutes to drive from central Chengdu to Jintang.

The expressway between Chengdu and Heilongtan (Chengdu section), heading south of the city, is 42 km (26 mi) long. It is also toll-free, and the journey from downtown Chengdu to Heilongtan will take only half an hour.

The extension of Guanghua Avenue heads west out of the city. It makes the journey time from Chongzhou City to Sanhuan Road less than half an hour.

The extension of Shawan Road going north is designed for travel at 60 km/h (37 mph). After it is connected to the expressways Pixian–Dujiangyan and Pixian–Pengzhou, it will take only 30 minutes to reach Pengzhou from Chengdu.

=== Coach ===
There are many major intercity bus stations in Chengdu, each serving different destinations.

- Chadianzi (茶店子): Hongyuan, Jiuzhaigou, Rilong Town, Ruo Ergai, Songpan County, Wolong and Langzhong
- Xinnanmen (新南门): Daocheng, Emei Shan, Jiǔzhàigōu, Kangding, Garzê Tibetan Autonomous Prefecture, Ya'an and Leshan
- Wuguiqiao (五桂桥): Chongqing
- Jinsha (金沙): Qionglai, Pi County and Huayang (华阳) Chengdu East railway Station

=== Highways ===
- National Highway G5 Beijing–Kunming
- National Highway G42 Shanghai–Chengdu
- National Highway G76 Xiamen–Chengdu
- National Highway G93 Chengdu–Chongqing Ring
- National Highway G4202 Chengdu Ring

=== Chengdu Metro ===
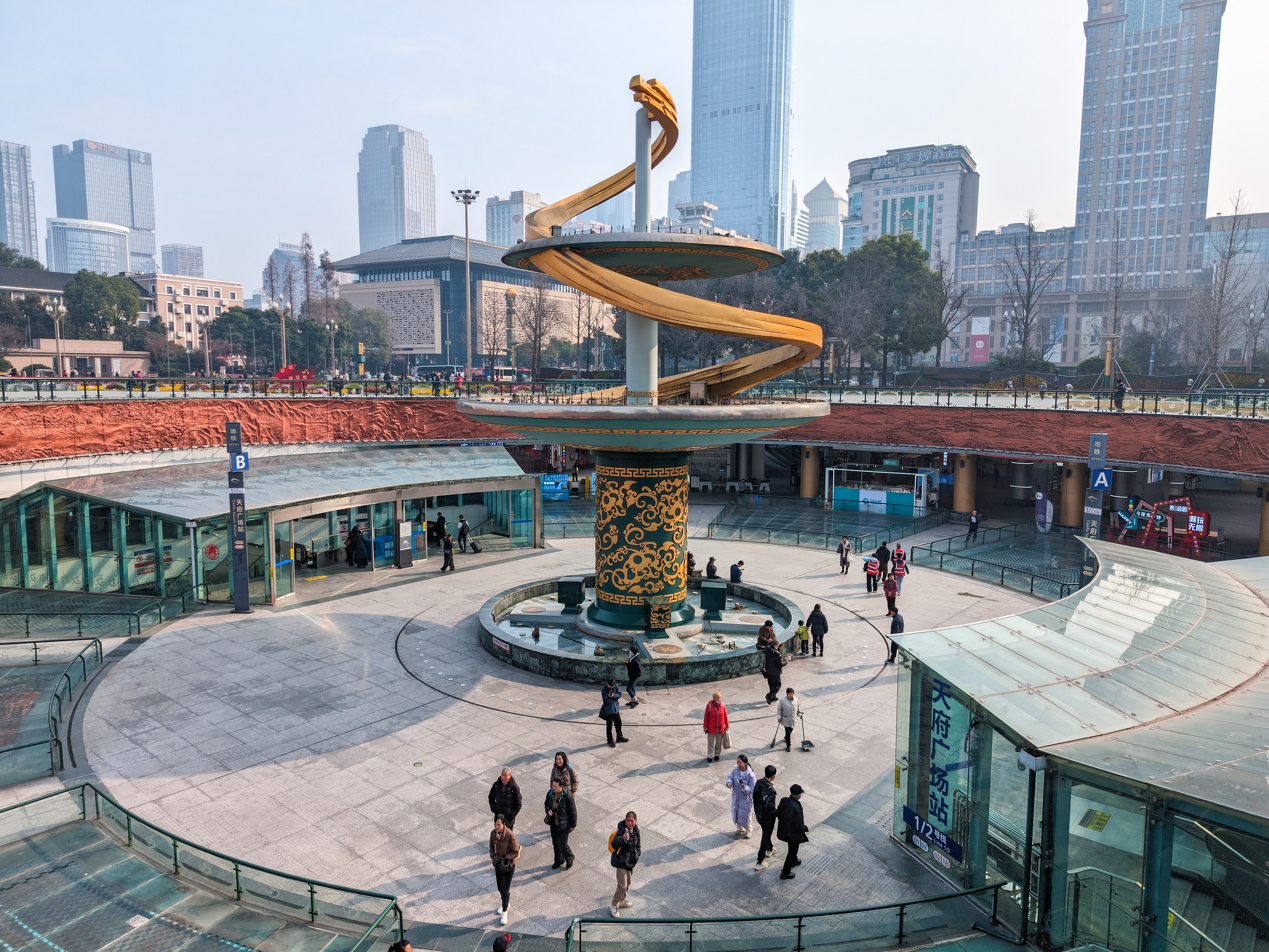
Tianfu Square Station

The Chengdu Metro officially opened on 1 October 2010. Line 1 runs from Shengxian Lake to Guangdu (south-north). Line 2 opened in September 2012. Line 3 opened in July 2016. Line 4 opened in December 2015. Line 10 connects to city center and Shuangliu International Airport. Future plans call for more than thirty lines. As of the end of December 2025, Chengdu has 718 km of 18 metro lines in operation.

=== Tram ===
Tourists use this traditional tram in Anren ancient town to tour the town on 29 September 2018, in Chengdu.

Chengdu Tram

Chengdu Tram Line, located in Chengdu City, the capital of Sichuan Province, is the city's first tram line to operate since 2018. The overall line is Y-shaped, with a total length of 39,3 km and 47 stations. It is also the first line in China to be equipped with the new generation.

=== Bus ===
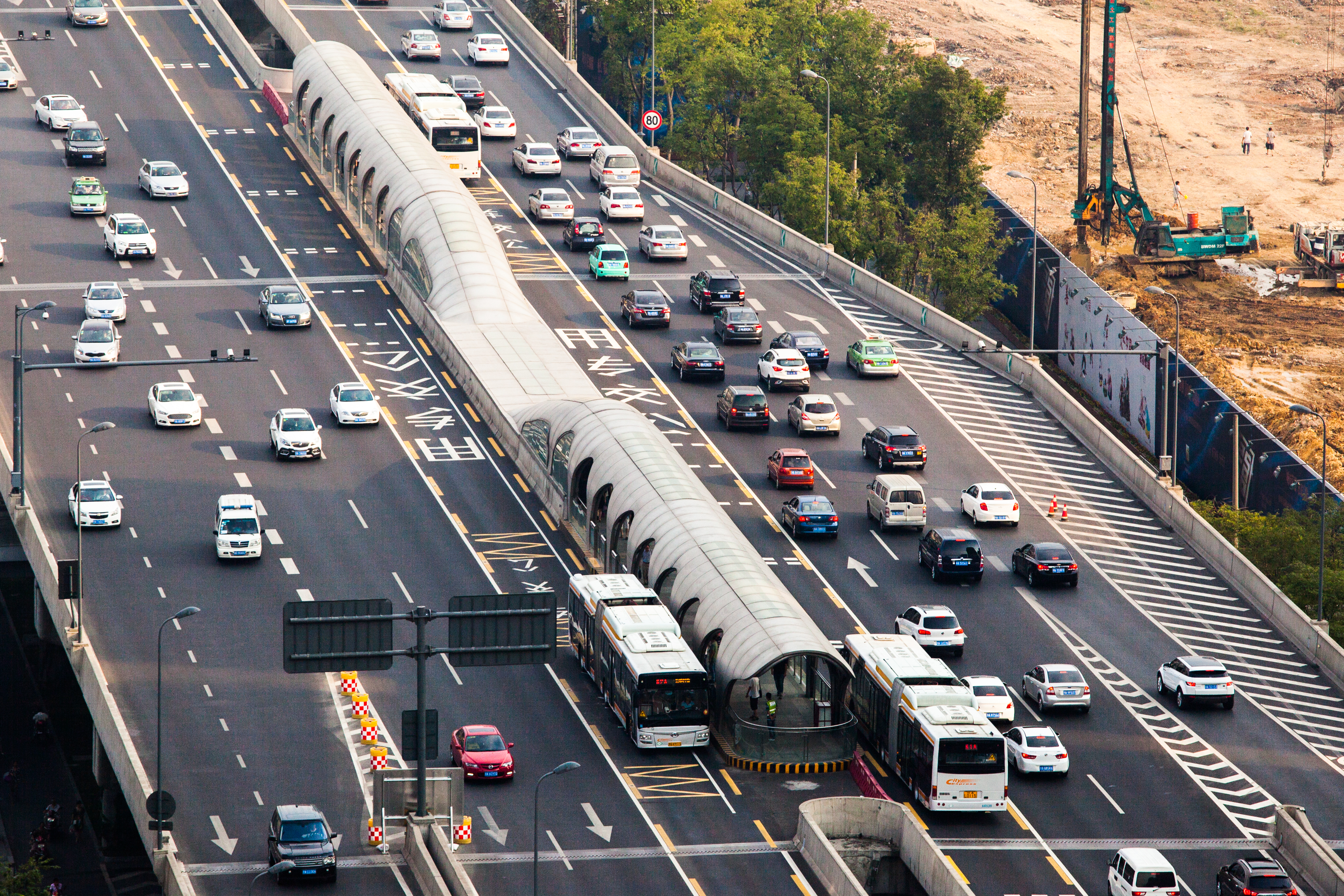
Chengdu BRT

Bus transit is an important method of public transit in Chengdu. There are more than 400 bus lines in Chengdu with nearly 12,000 buses in total. In addition, the Chengdu BRT offers services on the Second Ring Road Elevated Road. Bus cards are available that permit free bus transfers for three hours.

=== River transport ===
Historically, the Jinjiang River (also known as the Nanhe River) was used for boat traffic in and out of Chengdu. To ensure that Chengdu's goods have access to the Yangtze River efficiently, inland port cities of Yibin and Luzhou—both of which are reachable from Chengdu within hours by expressways—on the Yangtze have commenced large-scale port infrastructure development. As materials and equipment for the rebuilding of northern Sichuan are sent in from the East Coast to Sichuan, these ports will see significant increases in throughput.

== Education and research ==
Wen Weng, administrator of Chengdu in the Han dynasty, established the first local public school in the world, now named Shishi (literally "stone house"). The school site has not changed for more than 2,000 years, which remains the site of today's Shishi High School. No. 7 High School and Shude High School are also two famous local public schools in Chengdu.

Chengdu is a leading scientific research city, one of the only two cities in the Western China region (alongside Xi'an), ranking in the top 25 cities worldwide by scientific research outputs. It is consistently ranked # 1 as the center of higher education and scientific research in Southwest China. The city is home to more than 58 universities, with the two reputable ones being Sichuan University and the University of Electronic Science and Technology of China, ranking # 77 and #151 worldwide, respectively.

=== Higher education ===
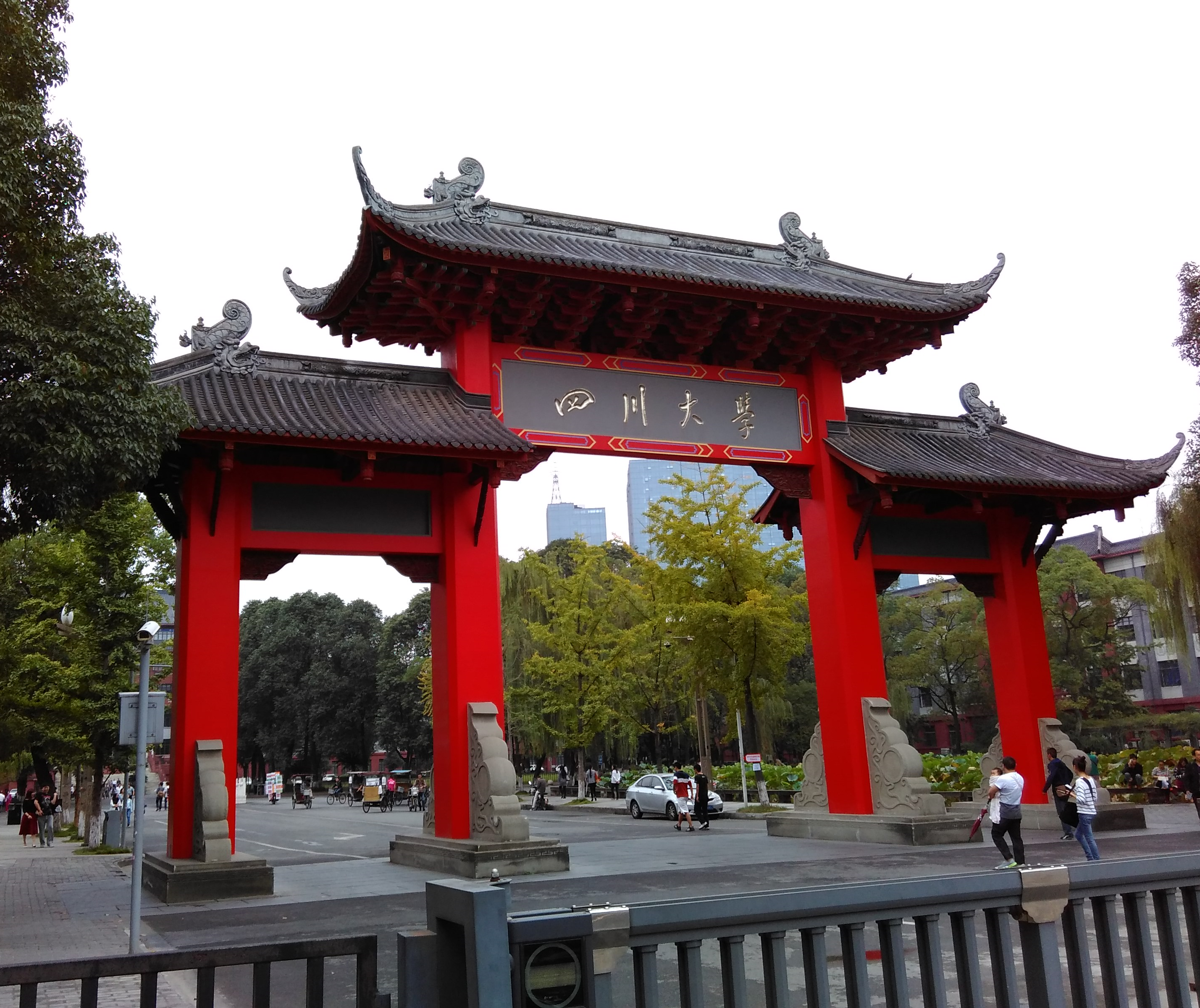
Sichuan University

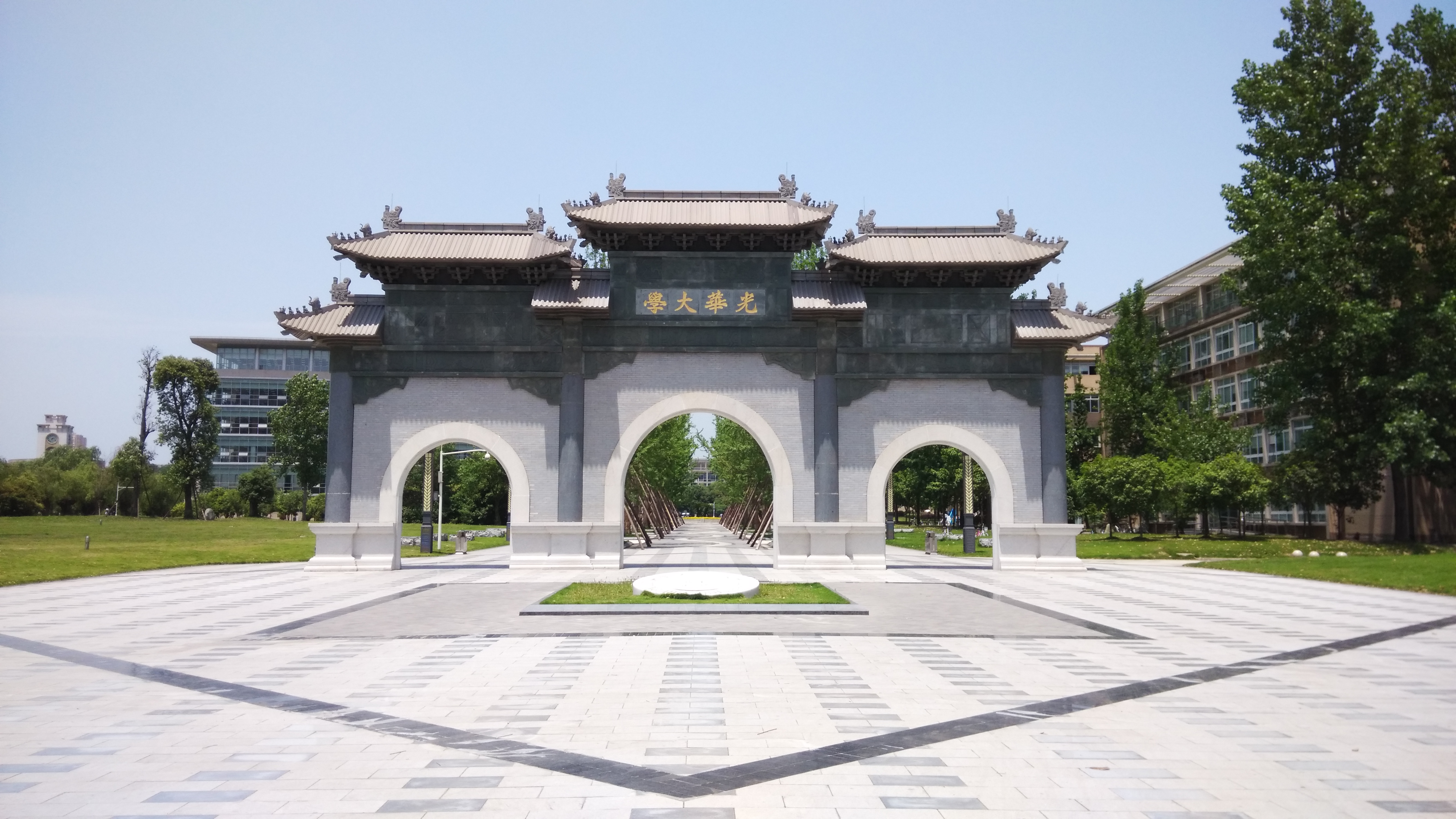
Southwestern University of Finance and Economics Guanghua Gate

- Sichuan University (SCU) (Founded in 1896), including the West China Medical Center of Sichuan University (Founded in 1910)
- Southwest Jiaotong University (Founded in 1896)
- Southwestern University of Finance and Economics (Founded in 1925)
- University of Electronic Science and Technology of China (Founded in 1956)
- Chengdu University of Technology (Founded in 1956)
- Sichuan Normal University (Founded in 1946)
- Chengdu University of Traditional Chinese Medicine (Founded in 1956)
- Chengdu Kinesiology University (Founded in 1942)
- Southwest University for Nationalities (Founded in 1951)
- Sichuan Conservatory of Music (Founded in 1939)
- Xihua University (Founded in 1960)
- Southwest Petroleum University (Founded in 1958)
- Chengdu University of Information Technology (Founded in 1951)
- Chengdu University (Founded in 1978)
- Chengdu Medical College (Founded in 1947)

Note: Private institutions or institutions without full-time bachelor's programs are not listed.

== Consulates ==
The United States Consulate General at Chengdu opened on 16 October 1985. It was the first foreign consulate in west-central China since 1949. The United States Consulate General at Chengdu was closed on 27 July 2020, corresponding to the closure of Chinese Consulate-General, Houston. The Sri Lankan consulate in Chengdu opened in 2009, and was temporarily closed in 2016. Currently, 13 countries have consulates in Chengdu. The Philippines, India, Greece, Argentina have been approved to open consulates in Chengdu.

Consulate	Year	Consular District
Germany Consulate General Chengdu	2003	Sichuan/Chongqing/Yunnan/Guizhou
Republic of Korea Consulate General Chengdu	2004	Sichuan/Chongqing/Yunnan/Guizhou
Thailand Consulate General Chengdu	2004	Sichuan/Chongqing
France Consulate General Chengdu	2005	Sichuan/Chongqing/Yunnan/Guizhou
Singapore Consulate General Chengdu	2006	Sichuan/Chongqing/Shaanxi
Pakistan Consulate General Chengdu	2007	Sichuan/Chongqing/Yunnan/Guizhou
Australia Consulate General Chengdu	2013	Sichuan/Chongqing/Yunnan/Guizhou
Austrian Consulate General Chengdu	2018	Sichuan/Chongqing/Yunnan/Guizhou
Nepal Consulate General Chengdu	2021	Sichuan/Chongqing/Guizhou
Chile Consulate General Chengdu	2021	Sichuan/Chongqing/Yunnan/Guizhou/Shaanxi
Spain Consulate General Chengdu	2022	Sichuan/Chongqing/Yunnan/Guizhou
Turkey Consulate General Chengdu	2023	Sichuan/Chongqing/Yunnan/Guizhou
Brazil Consulate General Chengdu	2024	Sichuan/Chongqing/Yunnan/Guizhou/Shaanxi

== Sports ==
=== Soccer ===
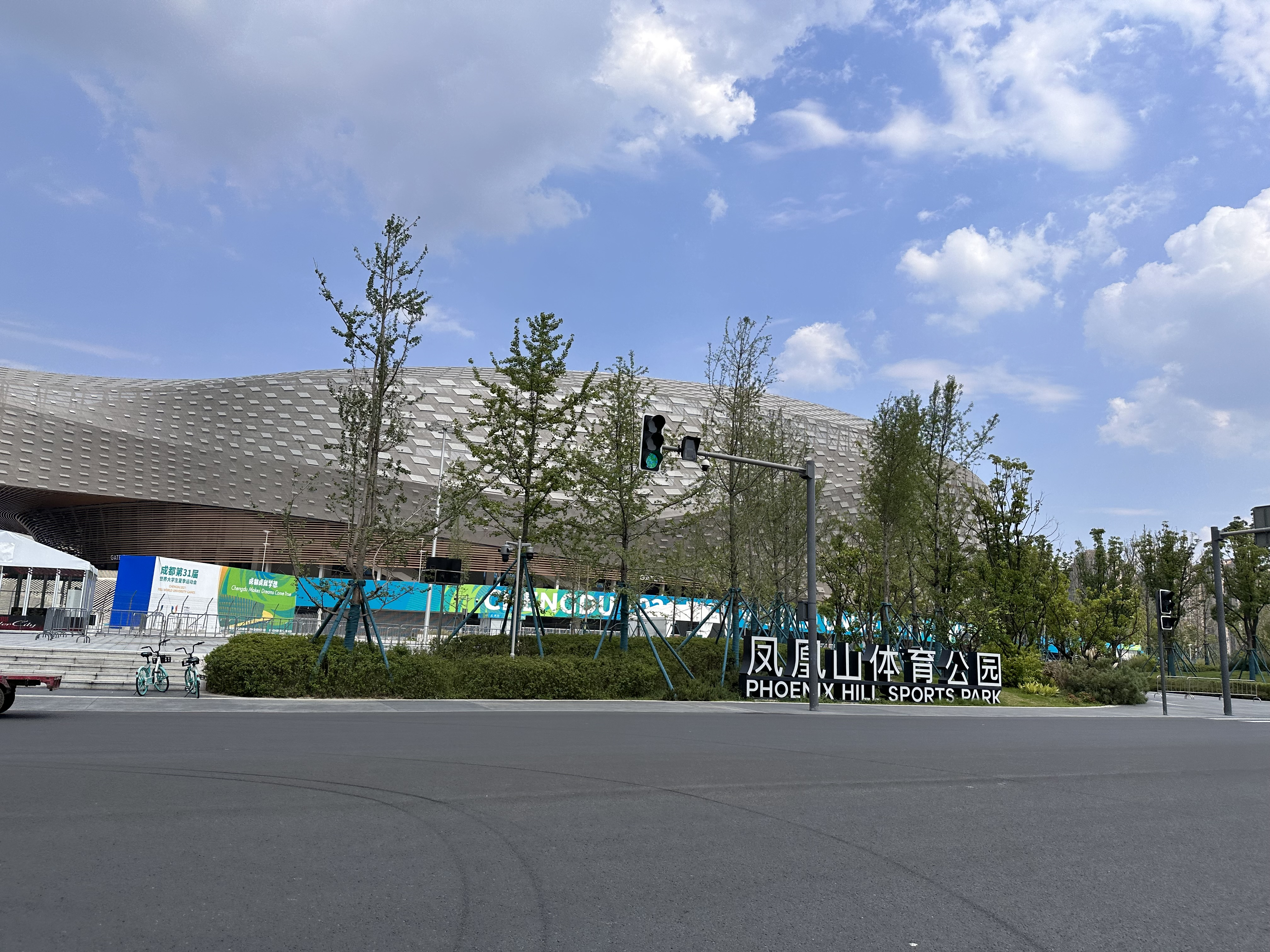
Chengdu Phoenix Hill Sports Park Football Stadium

Soccer is a popular sport in Chengdu. Chengdu Tiancheng, Chengdu's soccer team, played in the 42,000-seat Chengdu Sports Stadium in the Chinese League One. The club was founded on 26 February 1996 and was formerly known as Chengdu Five Bulls, named after their first sponsor, the Five Bulls Cigarette Company. English professional soccer club Sheffield United F.C took over the club on 11 December 2005. The club was later promoted into the China Super League until they were embroiled in a match-fixing scandal in 2009. Punished with relegation the owners eventually sold their majority on 9 December 2010 to Hung Fu Enterprise Co., Ltd and Scarborough Development (China) Co., Ltd. On 23 May 2013 the Tiancheng Investment Group announced the acquisition of the club.

Currently, Chengdu Rongcheng F.C. plays in the Chinese Super League.

Longquanyi Stadium was one of the four venues which hosted the 2004 AFC Asian Cup. Chengdu, along with Shanghai, Hangzhou, Tianjin, and Wuhan, hosted the 2007 FIFA Women's World Cup.

=== Tennis ===
Chengdu is the hometown of Grand Slam champions Zheng Jie and Yan Zi, who won the women's double championships at both the Australian Open and Wimbledon in 2006, and Li Na who won the 2011 French Open and 2014 Australian Open, has led to increased interest in tennis in Chengdu. Over 700 standard tennis courts have been built in the city in the past 10 years (2006–2016), and the registered membership for the Chengdu Tennis Association has grown to over 10,000 from the original 2,000 in the 1980s.

Chengdu is now part of an elite group of cities that host ATP (Association of Tennis Professionals) Champions Tour tournaments, along with London, Zürich, São Paulo, and Delray Beach. Chengdu Open, an ATP Championships Tour starting in 2009, have successfully invited star players including Pete Sampras, Marat Safin, Carlos Moya, Tomas Enqvist, and Mark Philippoussis.

=== Overwatch ===
Chengdu was represented in the Overwatch League by the Chengdu Hunters, the first major esports team to represent Chengdu. They played in the League's Pacific Division from 2019 until 2022.

=== League of Legends ===
Chengdu hosted the 2024 Mid-Season Invitational from 1 May to 19 May at the Chengdu Financial City Performing Arts Center. South Korean team Gen.G defeated home favorites Bilibili Gaming 3–1 in a rematch of their upper bracket final match. Before the 2024 League of Legends World Championship grand finals, it was also announced that Chengdu would also host the 2025 tournament Final.

=== Multi-sport events ===
Chengdu hosted the 2021 Summer World University Games, originally scheduled to take place from 8–19 August 2021. Still, the delayed Summer Olympics in Tokyo from 2020 to 2021 caused the proposed dates to be moved due to the COVID-19 pandemic. The games would eventually be delayed to 28 July – 8 August 2023 due to COVID-19 concerns. The city hosted the 2025 World Games.

=== Major sports venues ===
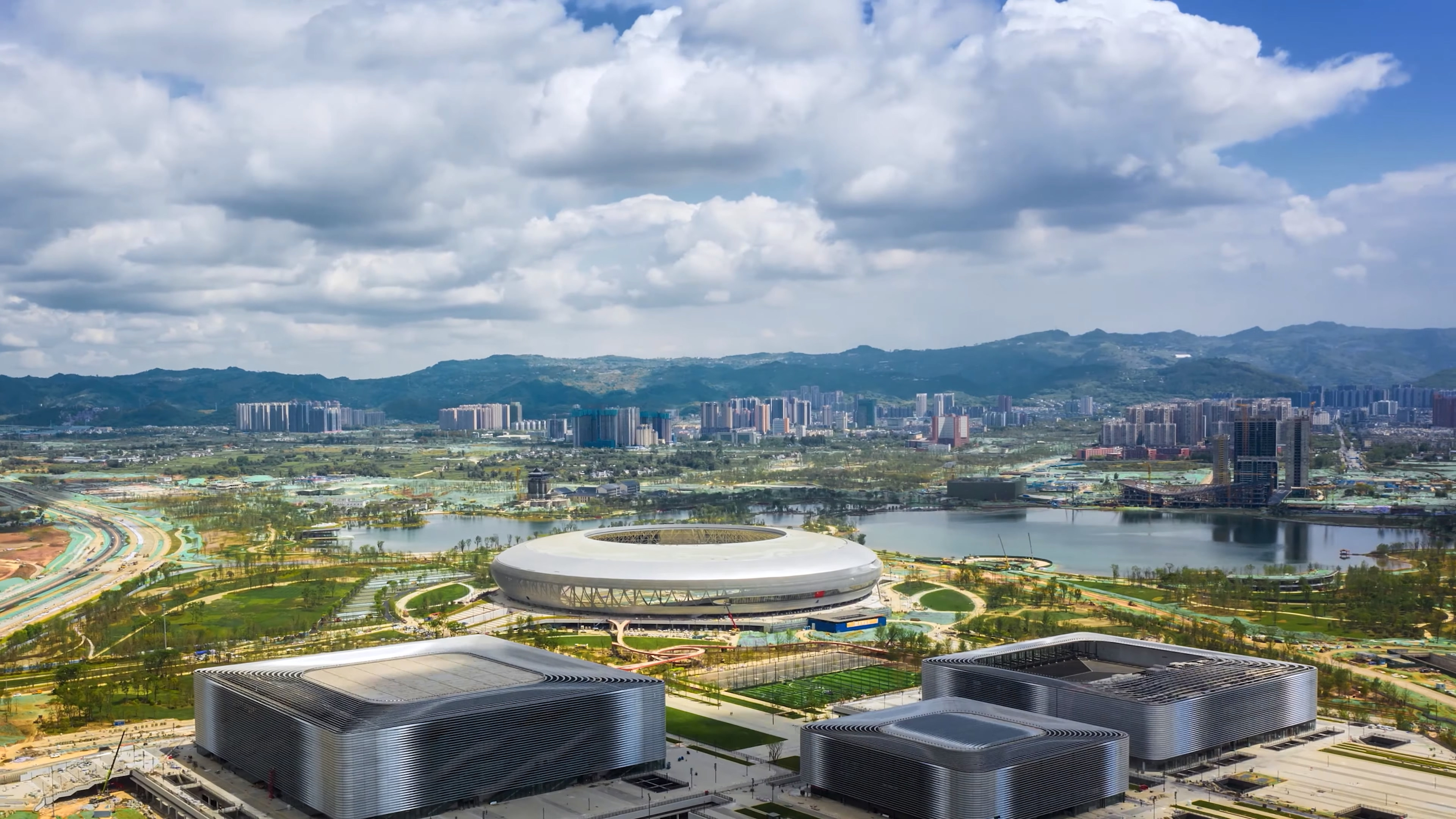
Chengdu Dong'an Lake Sports Park

The Chengdu Sports Center is located in downtown Chengdu, covering 140 acres (57 ha) and has 42,000 seats. As one of Chengdu's landmarks, it is the city's first large multipurpose venue, capable of hosting sports competitions, training, social activities, and performances. It is the home stadium of Chengdu's soccer team, the Chengdu Blades. The stadium hosted the 2007 FIFA Women's World Cup.

The Sichuan International Tennis Center, located 16 km (10 mi) away from Chengdu's Shuangliu International Airport, covers an area of 250,000 m^{2} (2,700,000 sq ft). It is the largest tennis center in southwest China and the fourth in China to meet ATP competition standards, after Beijing, Shanghai, and Nanjing. This center features 36 standard tennis courts and 11,000 seats. Since 2016, the Chengdu Open, an ATP Championship Tour tournament, has been held here annually.

The Chengdu Goldenport Circuit was a motorsport racetrack that hosted the A1 Grand Prix, Formula V6 Asia, China Formula 4 Championship, and China GT Championship from 2007 to 2018. It was replaced by the Chengdu Tianfu International Circuit, which opened in 2023.

== Twin towns and sister cities ==
Chengdu is twinned with:

- Agra, Uttar Pradesh, India
- Bengaluru, Karnataka, India
- Bonn, North Rhine-Westphalia, Germany (10 September 2009)
- Cebu City, Central Visayas, Philippines
- Cheyenne, Wyoming, United States
- Chiang Mai, Chiang Mai Province, Thailand
- Daegu, South Korea (10 November 2015)
- Fingal, Ireland
- Flemish Brabant, Flanders, Belgium (27 May 2011)
- Fort Worth, Texas, United States
- Gimcheon, North Gyeongsang Province, South Korea
- Hamilton, New Zealand (6 May 2015)
- Honolulu, Hawaii, United States (14 September 2011)
- Horsens, East Jutland, Denmark
- Maputo, Mozambique
- Kandy, Central Province, Sri Lanka
- Kathmandu, Nepal
- Knoxville, Tennessee, United States
- Kofu, Yamanashi, Japan (27 September 1984)
- Lahore, Punjab, Pakistan
- Linz, Upper Austria, Austria (1983)
- Ljubljana, Slovenia (1981)
- Łódź, Łódź Voivodeship, Poland (29 June 2015)
- Lviv, Lviv Oblast, Ukraine (2014)
- Maastricht, Limburg, Netherlands (13 September 2012)
- Mechelen, Belgium (1993)
- Medan, North Sumatra, Indonesia (2002)
- Melbourne, Victoria, Australia
- Montpellier, Languedoc-Roussillon, France (22 June 1981)
- Nashville, Tennessee, United States
- Palermo, Sicily, Italy
- Perth, Western Australia, Australia (September 2012)
- Phoenix, Arizona, United States
- Provo, Utah, United States
- Sheffield, South Yorkshire, United Kingdom (23 March 2010)
- Volgograd, Volgograd Oblast, Russia (27 May 2011)
- Windsor, Ontario, Canada
- Winnipeg, Manitoba, Canada (1988)
- Zapopan, Jalisco, Mexico

Chengdu also has friendly relationships or partnerships with:

- Adelaide, South Australia
- Alameda County, California, United States
- Ann Arbor, Michigan, United States
- Auckland, New Zealand
- Atlanta, Georgia, United States
- Baku, Azerbaijan
- Baltimore, Maryland, United States
- Baton Rouge, Louisiana, United States
- Bangkok, Thailand
- Beyoğlu, Istanbul, Turkey
- Bloomington, Indiana, United States
- Boise, Idaho, United States
- Boston, Massachusetts, United States
- Brooklyn (New York), United States
- Cambridge, Massachusetts, United States
- City of Gold Coast, Queensland, Australia
- Charlotte, North Carolina, United States
- Calgary, Alberta, Canada
- Cologne, North Rhine-Westphalia, Germany
- Colorado Springs, Colorado, United States
- Columbia, South Carolina, United States
- Dalarna, Sweden
- Detroit, Michigan, United States
- Denver, Colorado, United States
- Gwangju, South Korea
- Havana, Cuba
- Hartford, Connecticut, United States
- New Haven, Connecticut, United States
- Indianapolis, Indiana, United States
- New London, Connecticut, United States
- Jakarta, Indonesia
- Hiroshima, Hiroshima Prefecture, Japan
- Houston, Texas, United States
- Fez, Morocco
- Florence, Tuscany, Italy
- Fresno, California, United States
- Gatineau, Quebec, Canada
- Edmonton, Alberta, Canada
- London, England, United Kingdom
- Lansing, Michigan, United States
- Long Beach, California, United States
- Los Angeles County, California, United States
- Las Vegas, Nevada, United States
- Louisville, Kentucky, United States
- Los Angeles, California, United States
- Kansas City, Missouri, United States
- Kyoto, Kyoto Prefecture, Japan
- Huế, Vietnam
- Manhattan, New York City, United States
- Milan, Lombardy, Italy
- Milwaukee, Wisconsin, United States
- Minneapolis, Minnesota, United States
- Montreal, Quebec, Canada
- Moscow, Russia
- Đà Nẵng, Vietnam
- Nagoya, Aichi Prefecture, Japan
- Paris, France
- Pensacola, Florida, United States
- Pittsburgh, Pennsylvania, United States
- Portland, Oregon, United States
- Orange, California, United States
- Orlando, Florida, United States
- Ottawa, Ontario, Canada
- Rio de Janeiro, Brazil
- Salt Lake City, Utah, United States
- Santiago, Chile
- Saint Paul, Minnesota, United States
- Saint Petersburg, Russia
- Seoul, South Korea
- Sydney, New South Wales, Australia
- Tallinn, Estonia
- Tokyo, Tokyo Prefecture, Japan
- Toledo, Ohio, United States
- Tulsa, Oklahoma, United States
- Quebec City, Quebec, Canada
- Queens, New York City, United States
- Sacramento, California, United States
- San Antonio, Texas, United States
- San Diego, California, United States
- San Francisco, California, United States
- Seattle, Washington, United States
- Valencia, Spain
- Vancouver, British Columbia, Canada
- Washington, D.C., United States
- Yogyakarta, Indonesia
- Yokohama, Kanagawa Prefecture, Japan

== Notable people ==
- Derek Parfit, philosopher.
- Tang Danhong, filmmaker and poet
- Jing Gao, entrepreneur
- Yang Hongying (born 1962), best-selling author of children's fiction books
- Alfred Huang (born 1938), Lord Mayor of Adelaide from 2000 to 2003.
- Tao Jiali (born 1987), fighter pilot in the People's Liberation Army Air Force
- Muni He/Lily He (born 1999), golfer
- Shen Xiaoting (Born 1999), singer (Kep1er)
- Li Yifeng (born 1987), male actor
- Jason Zhang (born 1982), pop singer
- Li Yuchun (born 1984), singer and actress
- Jane Zhang (born 1984), singer and songwriter
- Gong Jun (born 1992), actor
- Zhao Lusi (born 1998), actress and singer
- Guo Feng (born 1962), songwriter and singer
- Xu Deqing (born 1963), general in the People's Liberation Army (PLA) serving as political commissar of the Central Theater Command since January 2022.
- Zhi-Ming Ma (born 1948), mathematics professor of Chinese Academy of Sciences, former Vice Chairman of the Executive Committee for International Mathematical Union
- Huajian Gao (born 1963), Chinese-American mechanician widely known for his contributions to the field of solid mechanics
- Zhang Zhengkai (born 2002), Chinese rapper known for his works in the Chinese underground rap scene. He is also signed to the net label Surf Gang.

== See also ==
- List of cities in China by population
- List of current and former capitals of subdivisions of China
- List of twin towns and sister cities in China
- New first-tier city

== Notes ==
Preceded by Chongqing	Capital of the Republic of China; 30 November 1949 – 27 December 1949	Succeeded by Taipei
