= Chengdu International Finance Square =

Skyscraper in Chengdu, China

- 成都国际金融中心
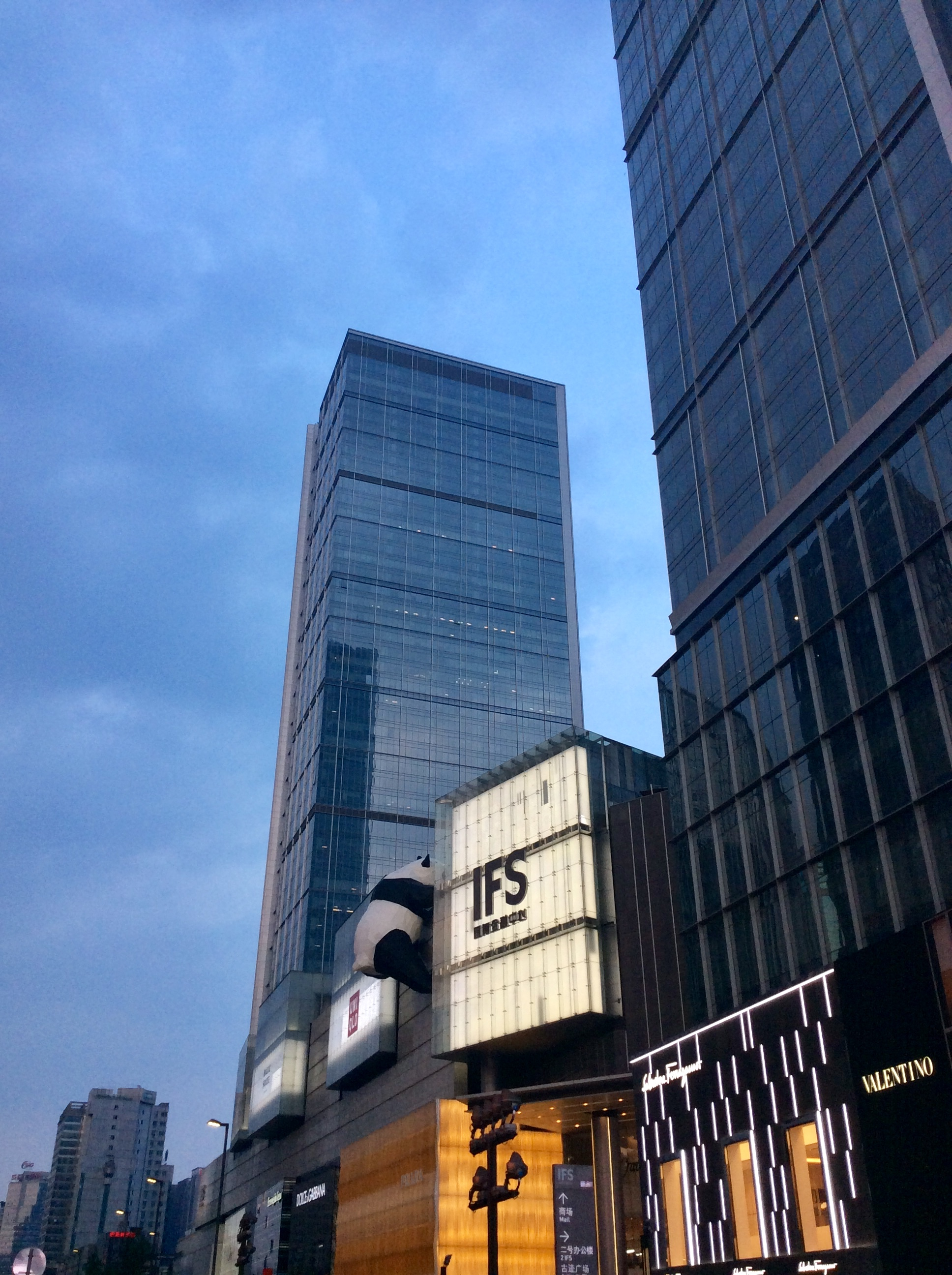

General information
- Status: Completed
- Type: Office, Residential, Hotel
- Architectural style: Modernism
- Location: Chengdu, China, Hongxing Road 3rd Section
- Coordinates: 30.6572°N 104.0785°E
- Construction started: 2010
- Completed: 2015
- Cost: ¥ 17 Billion

Height
- Roof: 247 m (810 ft) (Tower 1 and 2)

Technical details
- Structural system: Reinforced concrete
- Floor count: 50 (Tower 1 and 2)
- Floor area: 760,000 m^{2} (8,180,000 sq ft)
- Lifts/elevators: 24

Design and construction
- Architects: Kohn Pedersen Fox; Benoy Architects
- Developer: Wharf Holdings Limited; Lung Kam Integrated Development
- Structural engineer: East China Architectural Design & Research Institute
- Main contractor: The Wharf

Other information
- Public transit: Chengdu Metro: Pidu; Xindu

Website
- Official website

The Chengdu International Finance Square (成都国际金融中心), commonly abbreviated as Chengdu IFS or simply IFS, is a mixed-use skyscraper complex in the Chunxi Road area in the Jinjiang District of Chengdu, Sichuan, China. Built between 2010 and 2015, the complex consists of four main buildings, from which the tallest are a pair of twin towers standing at 247 m (810 ft) with 50 floors each, which share the record of the fourth tallest building in Chengdu.

== History ==
=== Project ===
The complex was designed after the Harbour City shopping centre in Hong Kong and is a popular landmark in Chengdu. It has a total area of 760,000 m^{2} (8,180,000 sq ft) and cost a total of ¥ 17 billion. It includes two 247 m (810 ft) tall towers housing Grade A offices with a total usable area of 290,000 m^{2} (3,120,000 sq ft), an 8-story shopping mall with a total area of 210,000 square meters, a hotel with 230 rooms and a serviced apartment with an area of 76,000 square meters. The complex opened the shopping mall in 2014, the two office buildings between 2013 and 2015, and hotel at the end of 2015. The serviced apartments from within the latter were opened at the end of 2016. The mall is a luxury shopping destination in Chengdu, with various brand stores such as Lane Crawford, Louis Vuitton, Dior, and Armani. The panda sculpture named "I am Here" designed by the American visual artist Lawrence Argent on its exterior wall has also become a popular attraction in the mobile Internet era of the city.

On September 20, 2007, the Wharf Holdings Group won the auction for the former Chengdu Department Store site on Hongxing Road in Chengdu, with a high bid of ¥ 88 Million, defeating real estate developers such as Swire, Hang Lung Group, China Resources, Sun Hung Kai & Co. and New World. This auction also set a record for the transaction price of land auctions in Chengdu and was called the "Hongxing Road Land King". According to the development conditions proposed by the Chengdu Municipal Government, Wharf Holdings Group needed to start construction within 8 months and complete the project within 3 and a half years. However, in mid-April 2008, the site was excavated with the remains of Song Dynasty water conservancy and street market, which caused the project to be suspended for a time. After the National Cultural Heritage Administration proposed that the site should not be destroyed, Wharf Holdings Group and the Chengdu Municipal Government were at an impasse for a time, and there were even rumors that Wharf Holdings Group would withdraw from the development. Under the influence of the Wenchuan earthquake in May, the construction of IFS was even more difficult to proceed at the original speed, and the design plan was modified. Ultimately, Chengdu IFS took five years to complete and was finished in 2013. From the end of 2013 to the second half of 2016, various sections were opened to the public.

== Design ==
The Chengdu International Financial Center twin towers co-hold the record of the third tallest skyscrapers currently built in the city (after the 339-meter-tall Tianfu Panda Tower and the Chengdu Greenland Tower under construction). The complex adopts a modernist architectural style with a simple and bright "glass box" appearance. The project draws on the design concept of Wharf Holdings' Harbour City in Hong Kong and is designed with the concept of "city within a city".

=== Shopping mall ===
The shopping center of Chengdu IFS was designed by Benoy Architects, a British architectural design firm, with a building area of 210,000 m^{2} (2,260,000 sq ft). The commercial podium is a simple and clear rectangular block, while the main storefronts are inserted into the original regular facade with several staggered "glass boxes", forming a 530-meter-long high-end commercial street image on the Hongxing Road side. At the main entrance, a set of escalators spanning three floors leads the flow of people into the upper floors of the shopping center, enhancing the popularity of each floor of the shopping center. The 7th floor of the shopping center is an open open-air garden of more than 10,000 m^{2} (108,000 sq ft), connecting the hotel and the shopping center, providing a venue for irregular cultural and art exhibitions, and also providing a resting space for citizens. At the entrance on the side of Jiangnan Guan Street on the 1st floor of the shopping center, there is a "historical square", and the glass floor below it is the site of the Jiangnan Guan Street neighborhood during the Tang and Song Dynasties. According to the designer, this design "forms a novel landscape of 'history underfoot and the world above'", which not only maintains the appearance of historical relics, but also avoids the negative impact of traditional exhibition halls on the flow of people in the shopping center.

The traffic flow design of the shopping center inherits the consistent style of Hong Kong shopping centers: the entrance is designed as a "double ground floor" through three escalators, allowing people to gather on the 1st and 3rd floors at the same time, which improves the utilization rate of the upper floors and allows many luxury jewelry and watch brands and Lane Crawford Department Store to move into the upper floors. At the same time, the shopping center introduces a parking lane from Sha Mo Street to the 3rd floor, making it easier for customers to reach the 3rd floor. Inside the building, single and double escalators are used extensively. At the same time, 10 elevators are placed in prominent places in the mall and are distinguished by the floors they stop at to facilitate customers to pass through quickly and vertically.

The shopping center features multi-level public spaces that create a sense of openness, with a seven-story skylight allowing ample natural light to flood the interior spaces from the second basement level to the sixth. Internally, Chengdu IFS adopts a "pedestrian street" concept, using streamlined corridors and two-story-high interior shop facades to create the illusion of an outdoor pedestrian street. The interior employs a neutral and minimalist design style, focusing customer attention on the shops themselves. This design style also facilitates future renovations and refurbishments.

The shopping center’s basement floors 1 and 2 are “family area”, which includes affordable restaurants, toy stores, supermarkets, bookstores and ice rinks. The floors are paved with coffee-colored artificial stone slabs to create a warm and welcoming atmosphere. Floors 1 to 3 are “high area”, which mainly houses upscale stores. The floors are paved with beige marble and double-story store design to create a simple, elegant, quiet and comfortable atmosphere. Floors 4 to 6 are “sky area”, which mainly houses entertainment areas such as cinemas and trendy concept stores. These three floors use a neutral color scheme and white and light gray artificial stone floors to create a fashionable and modern feel, while organically connecting with the garden on the 7th floor.

=== Towers ===
The tower section of the Chengdu International Financial Center was designed by the American firm Kohn Pedersen Fox. The two main towers are 248 meters high and have 50 floors; there are also two smaller towers used as offices, hotels and apartments. The tower office area is located on the 8th to 50th floors, including 3 trading floors. The tower is designed with a 10-meter-high ground floor entrance, and also connects to the shopping center in an elevator lobby with a floor height of more than 9 meters on the 3rd floor. Each tower has 24 passenger elevators and 2 freight elevators, with an average waiting time of no more than 35 seconds. The office floors are equipped with more than 80 air conditioning units providing variable frequency ventilation, with a cooling capacity of 150W/㎡ for standard floors and 170W/㎡ for trading floors.

=== Artworks ===
“I am Here” is a sculpture designed by American installation artist Lawrence Argent, and its form is a giant panda trying to climb the Chengdu IFS shopping mall. The installation is 13 meters high and weighs 13 tons. It was inspired by wild pandas in Ya'an and was originally planned as a temporary installation for a year and a half. After the sculpture was completed, it quickly became a landmark of Chengdu IFS, Chunxi Road-Hongxing Road business district and even the whole city of Chengdu. Therefore, Wharf Holdings decided to keep it as a permanent art installation of Chengdu IFS. At the same time, a charity auction of derivative works was held when the artwork was completed, and the funds raised were donated to the China Conservation and Research Center for the Giant Panda.

== Usage ==
The shopping center section of Chengdu International Finance Center quickly reached an occupancy rate of over 90%, with merchants including luxury brands such as Burberry, Bulgari, Chanel, Coach, Dior, Fendi, Louis Vuitton, Givenchy, Prada and Tiffany. In addition, the anchor tenants in Chengdu IFS also include the Lane Crawford Department Store, the Yan Ji You Bookstore, the UA IMAX Cinema, and the Ice & Joy Ice Rink. Unlike most shopping centers in Chengdu, the catering ratio in Chengdu IFS is only 15%, avoiding direct competition with the saturated autochthonous catering market. Currently, Chengdu IFS has nearly 300 stores. In 2016, the revenue of Chengdu IFS mall increased by 11% to RMB 3.85 billion; in 2017 it increased by 23% to RMB 4.388 billion, with an occupancy rate of 99%, which is in a leading position among Wharf Holdings' mainland properties. In 2018, the mall’s turnover reached RMB 5.19 billion, ranking first in Chengdu.

Unlike the booming shopping mall, the office space utilization rate of Chengdu International Finance Center is not high. In 2014, the office space leased in Chengdu IFS was 50,000 square meters, with an occupancy rate of 40%. By August 2015, the leased area of Chengdu IFS accounted for only 30% of the total office space. As the operation gradually matured in the following years, the vacancy rate of Chengdu IFS office space decreased.

In Tower 3 of Chengdu IFS, there is the Niccolo Hotel, a high-end chain hotel under Wharf Holdings. The hotel has 230 suites, ranging in size from 45 square meters to 200 square meters. The hotel has four dining venues: Xin Chu Western Restaurant, Yue Xuan Chinese Restaurant, Yue Lounge (offering tea and snacks) and Lounge. The hotel has several banquet halls and an oval chapel on the 8th floor overlooking the rooftop sculpture garden on the 7th floor. The hotel also offers a gym, swimming pool, in-room dining and wireless internet service.

Tower 4 of Chengdu IFS houses the IFS Guojin Court serviced apartments, owned by Wharf Holdings. The apartments offer 175 suites, ranging from one-bedroom to three-bedroom units. The apartments also feature a gym, swimming pool, children's playground and exclusive lounge.

== Criticism ==
At the beginning of the construction of Chengdu IFS, the State Administration of Cultural Heritage of China proposed that an exhibition hall be built for the Jiangnan Guanjie neighborhood ruins underground for on-site protection and display. However, after the project was completed, Chengdu IFS, citing reasons such as saving costs after the Wenchuan earthquake, maintaining commercial flow and feng shui, only set up a glass floor at the entrance under the name of "Ancient Sites Plaza" to display a small part of the underground ruins. Due to the heavy glass material and lack of clear signs, customers and citizens rarely noticed the existence of the ruins. This also drew criticism from cultural heritage workers in China and some Chengdu citizens. In August 2017, Chengdu also proposed to the State Administration of Cultural Heritage a plan to upgrade and display the ruins as a whole in order to achieve the display effect initially promised by Wharf Holdings.

== Complex gallery ==
Complex exterior

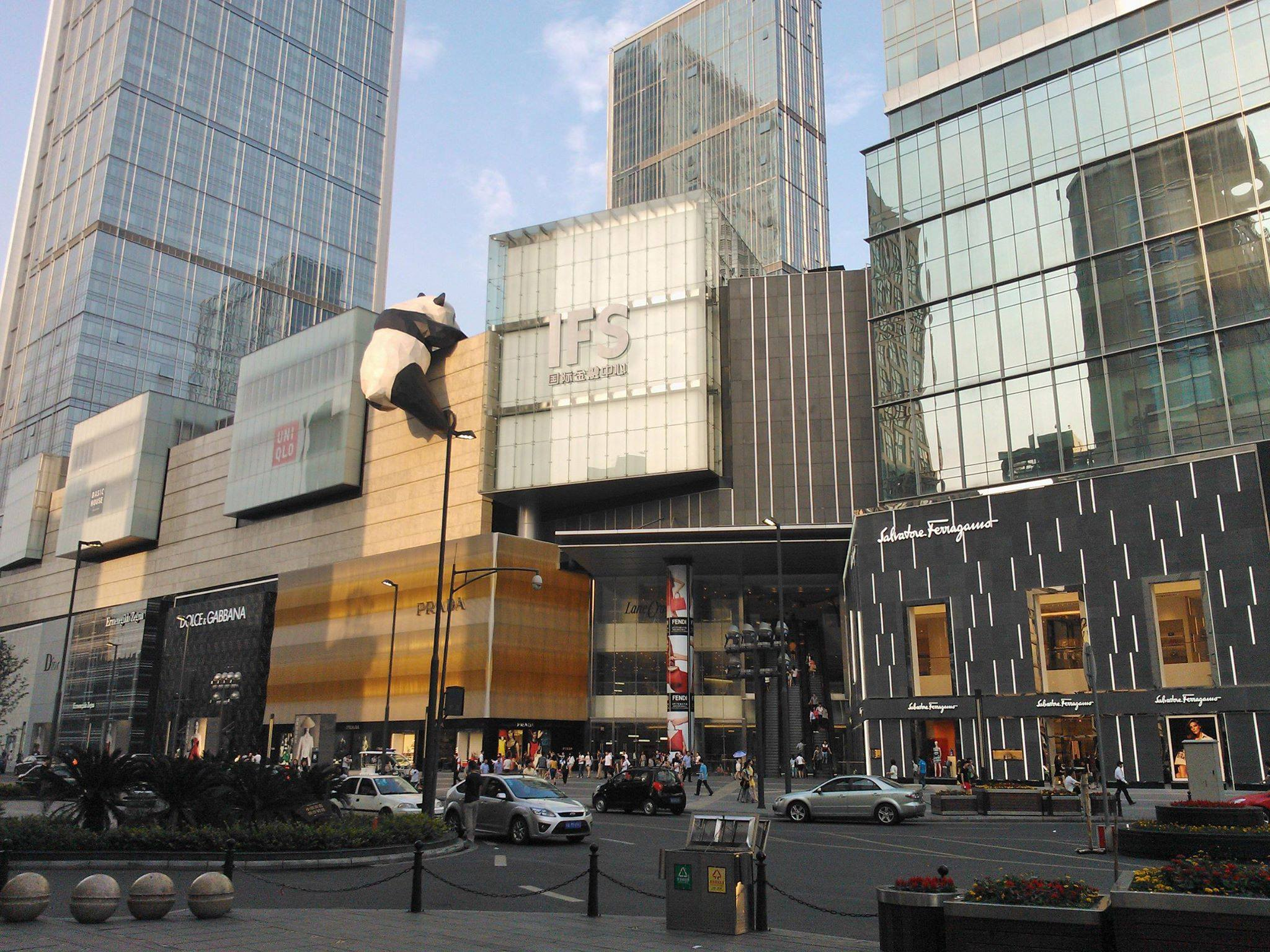
IFS frontal panoramic view facing Hongxing Road

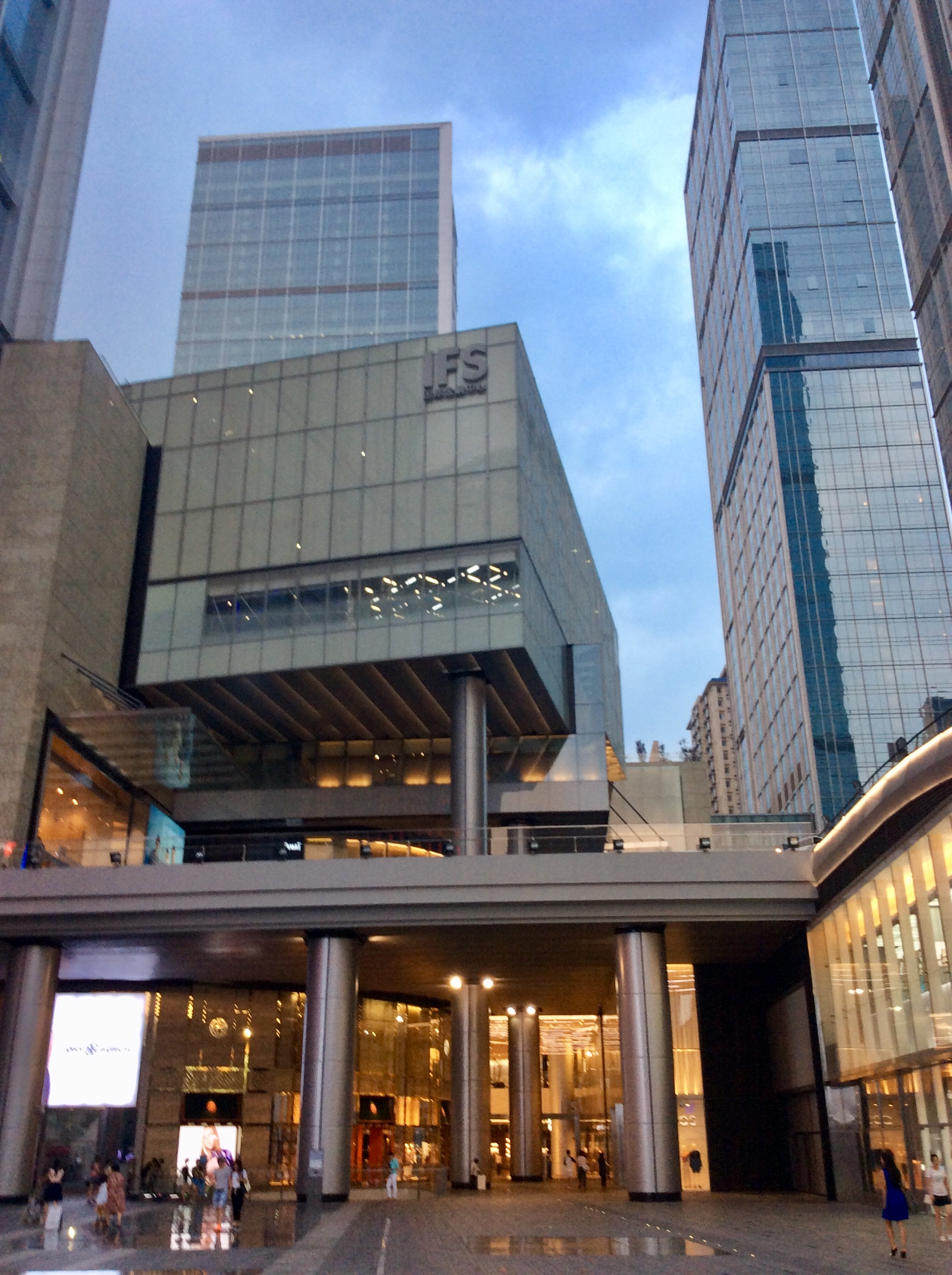

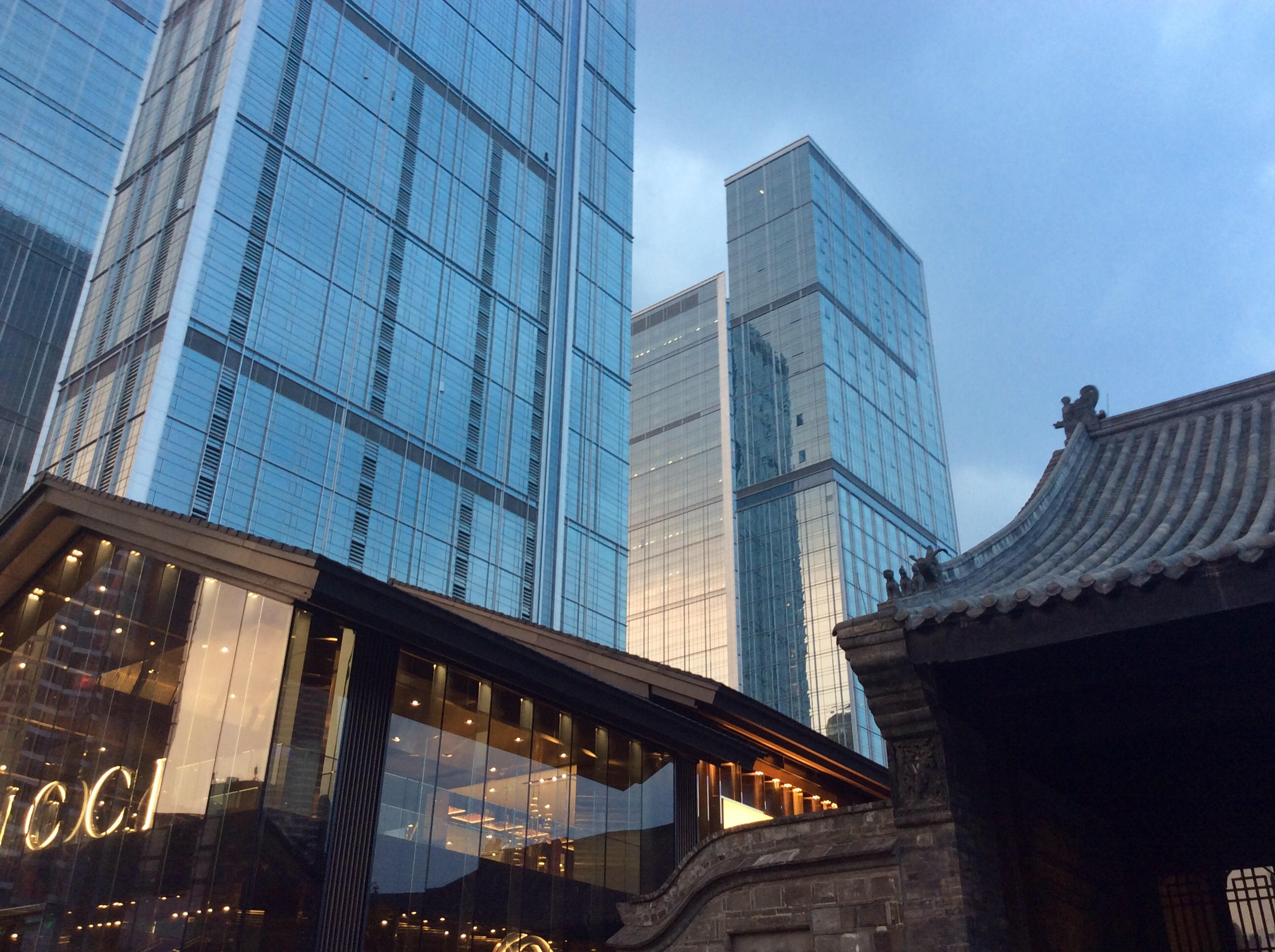
View of Chengdu IFS Towers 3 and 4 from Taikoo Li Chengdu

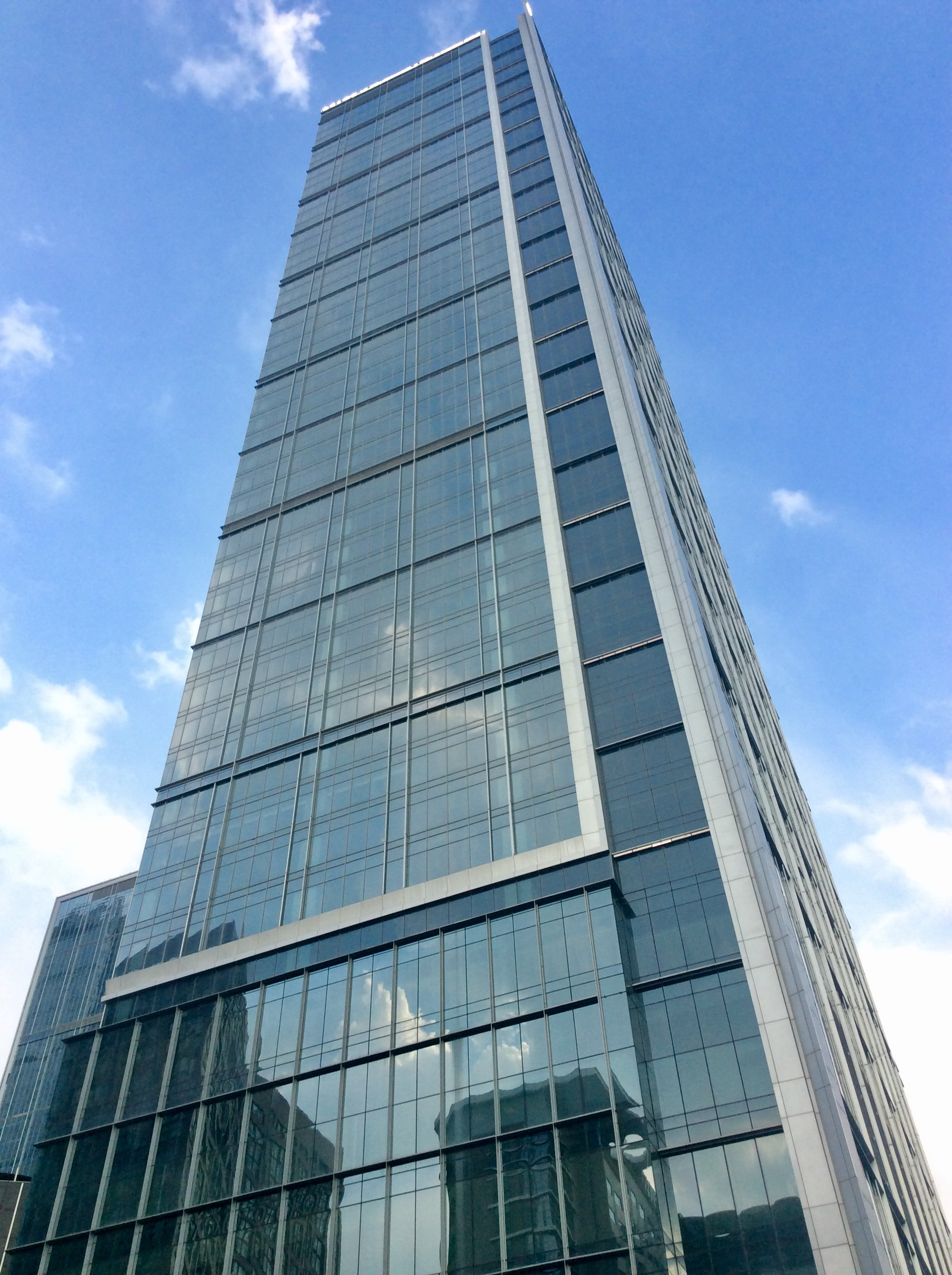
Chengdu IFS Tower 2
The shopping center

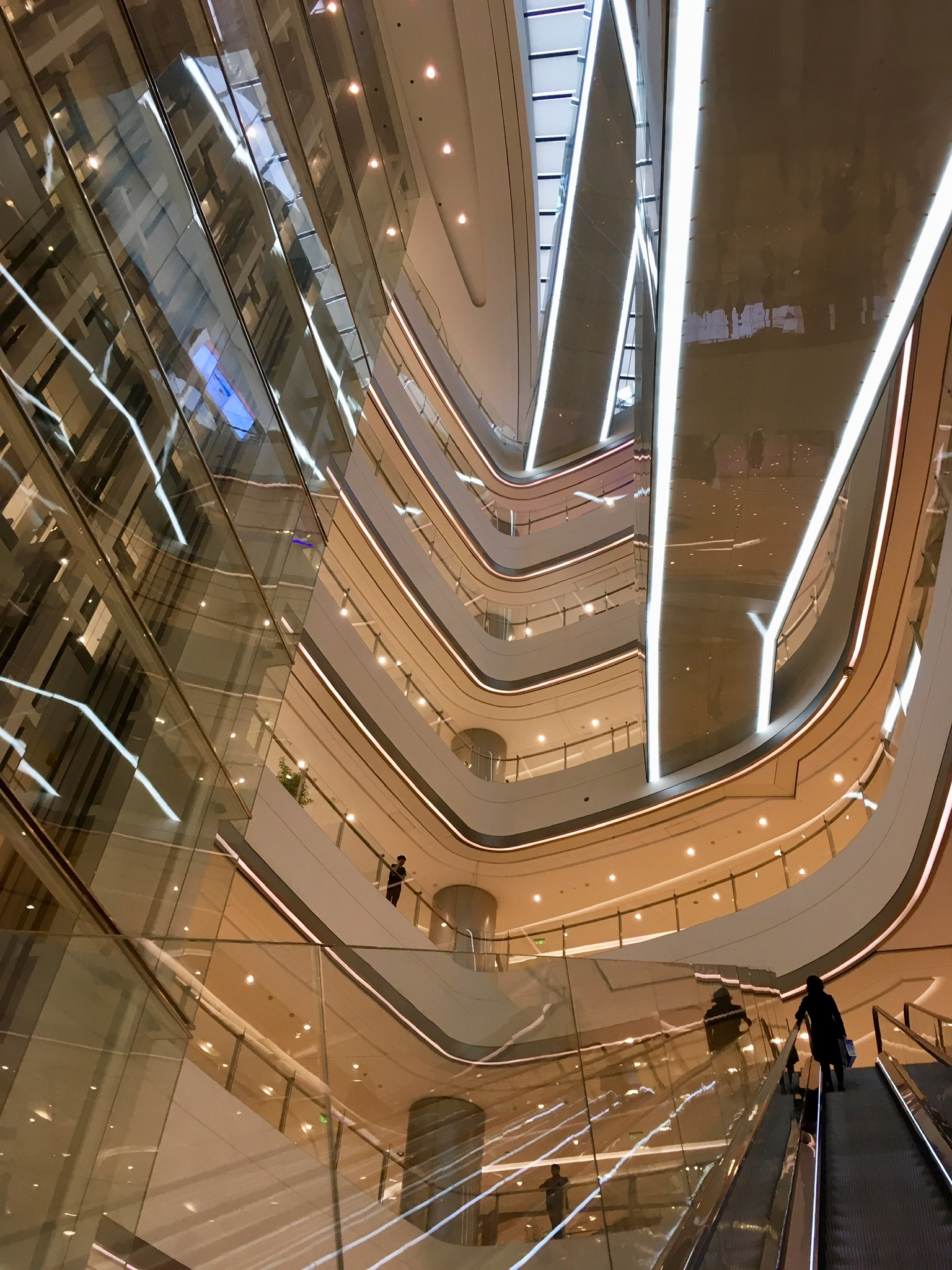
Chengdu IFS Shopping Center Atrium

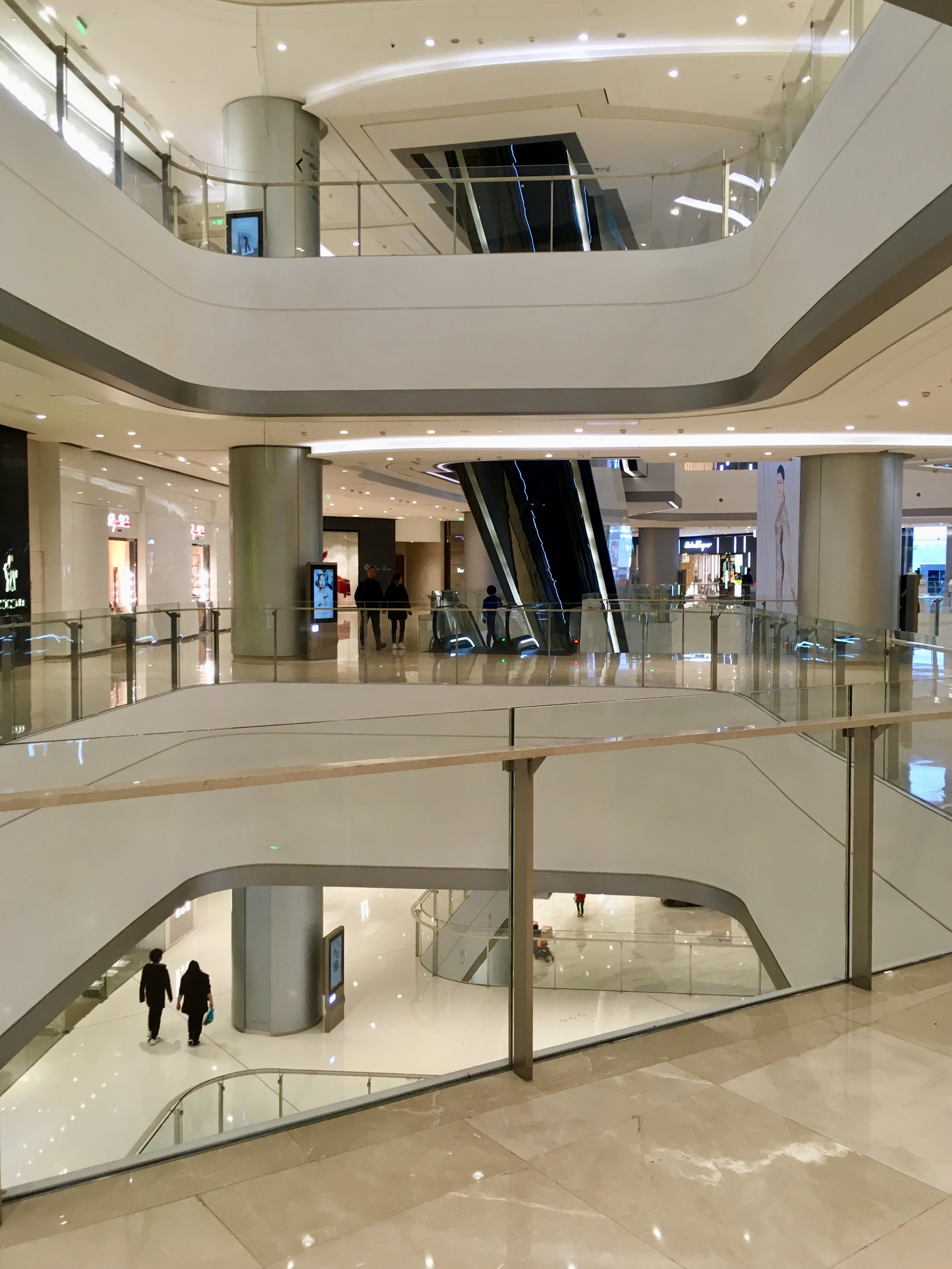
1st floor of shopping mall

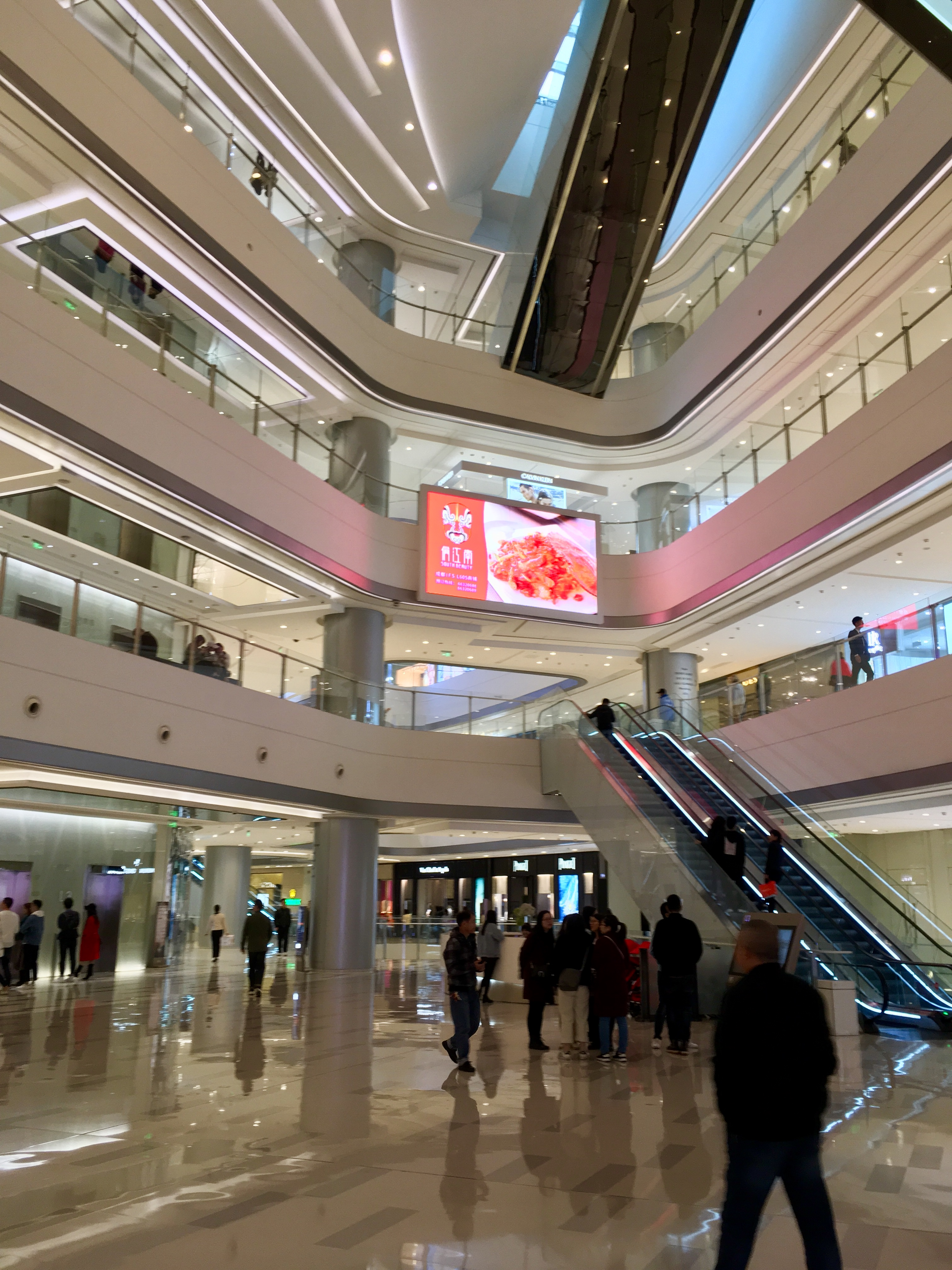
3rd floor direct access to the escalator entrance plaza

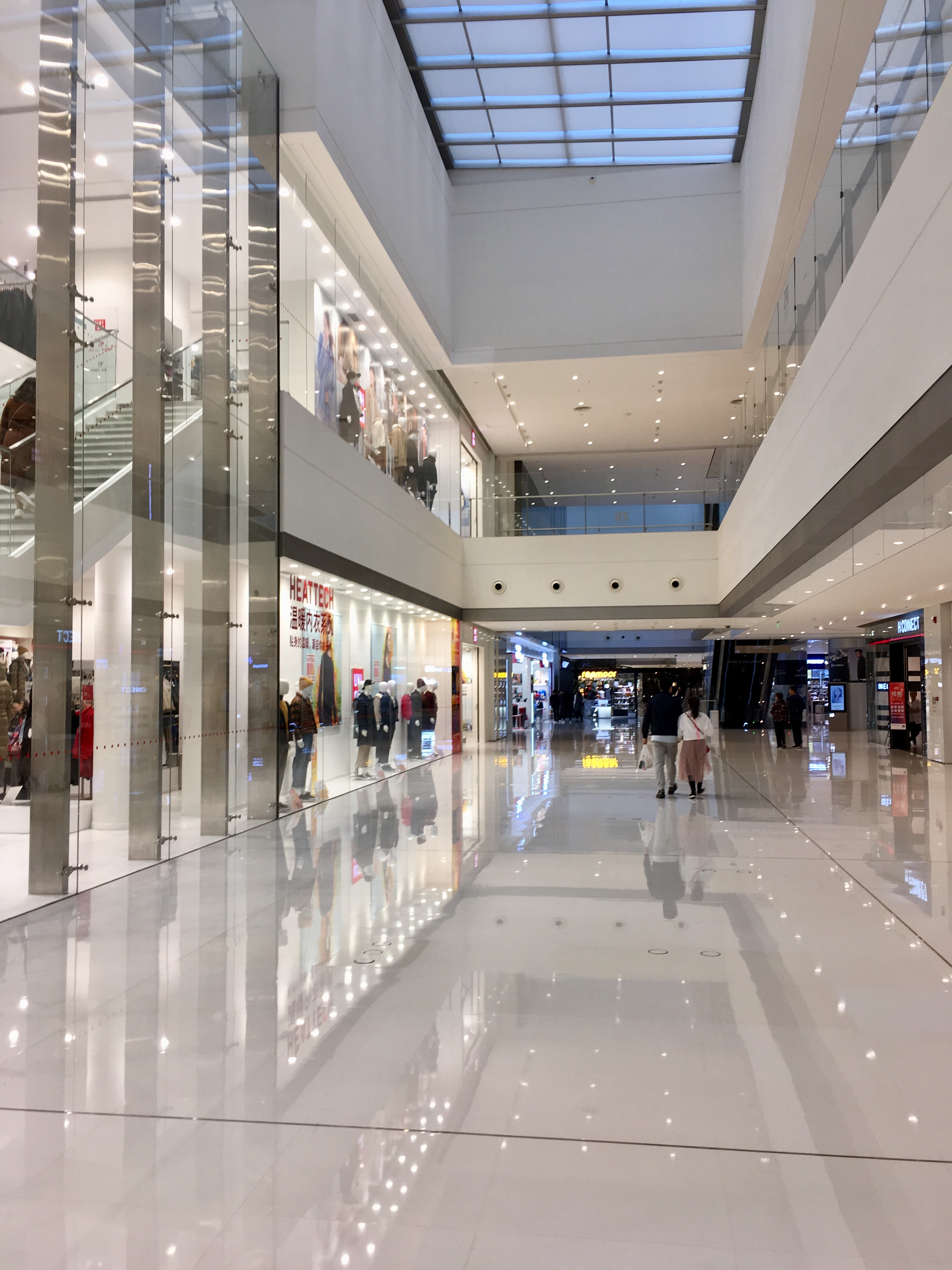
5th Floor "Sky Zone" Two-Story Shopping Street

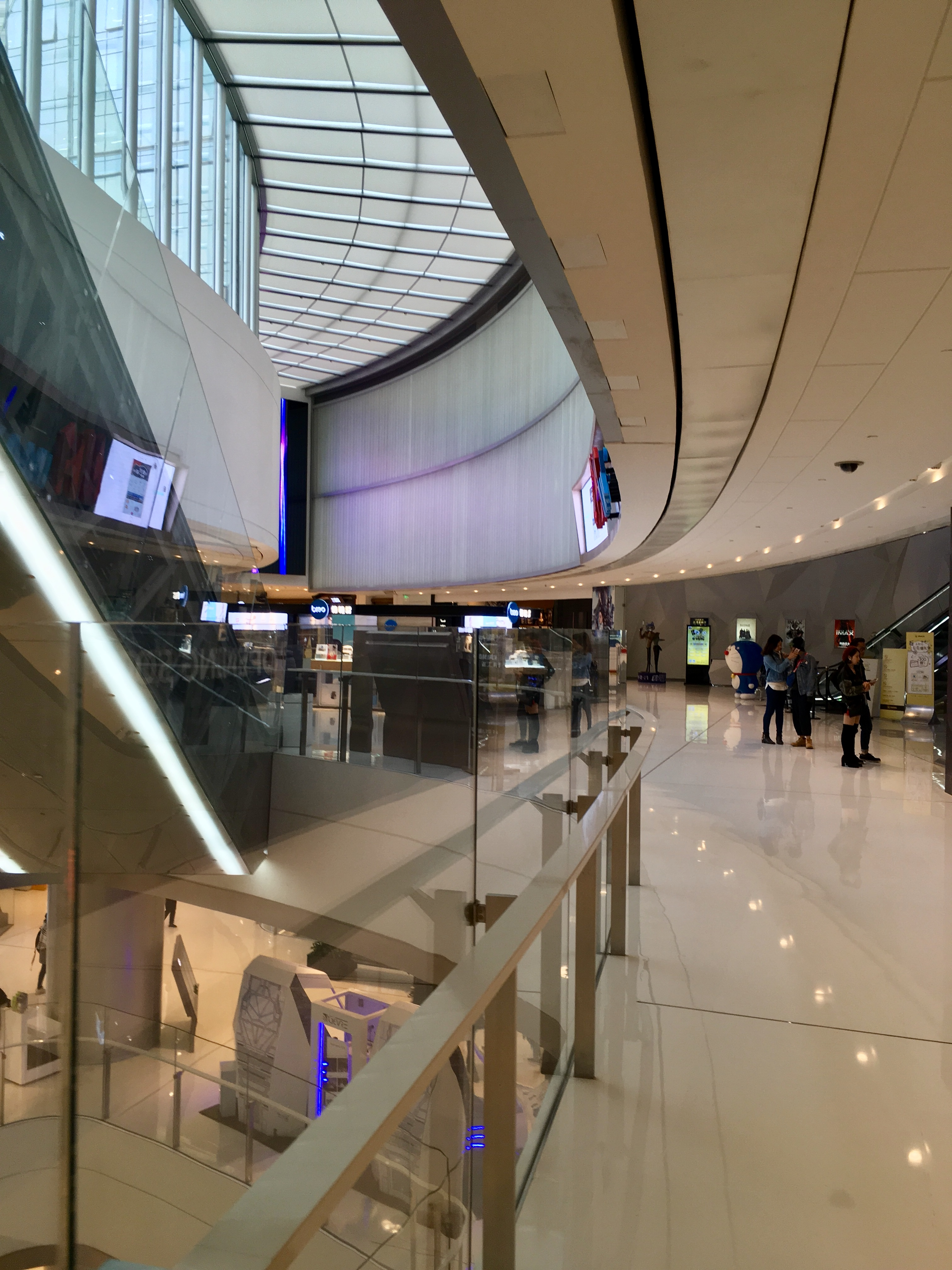
6th Floor Cinema and Connecting Escalator

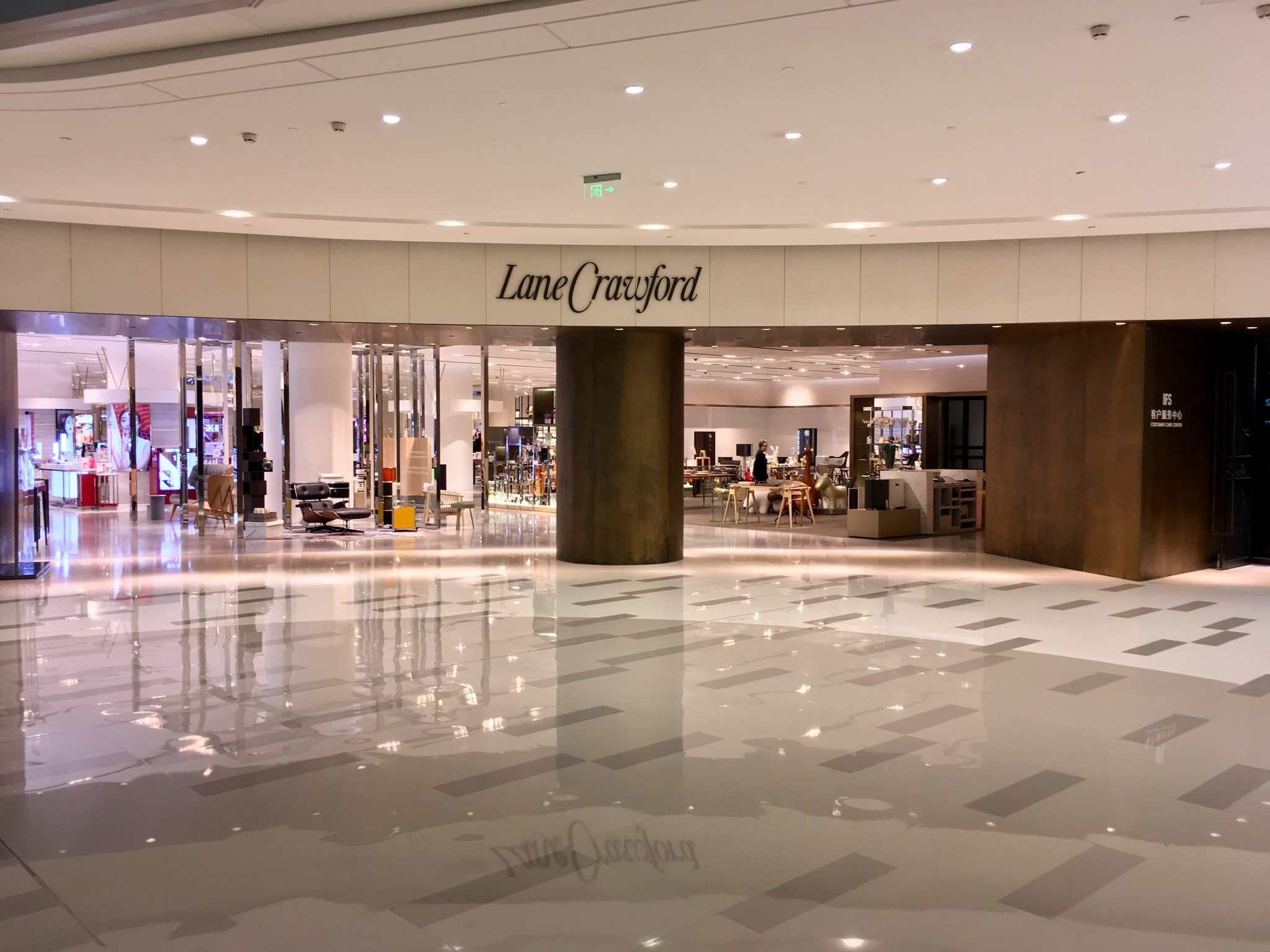
Lane Crawford Chengdu
'I am Here' Statue and Sculpture Garden

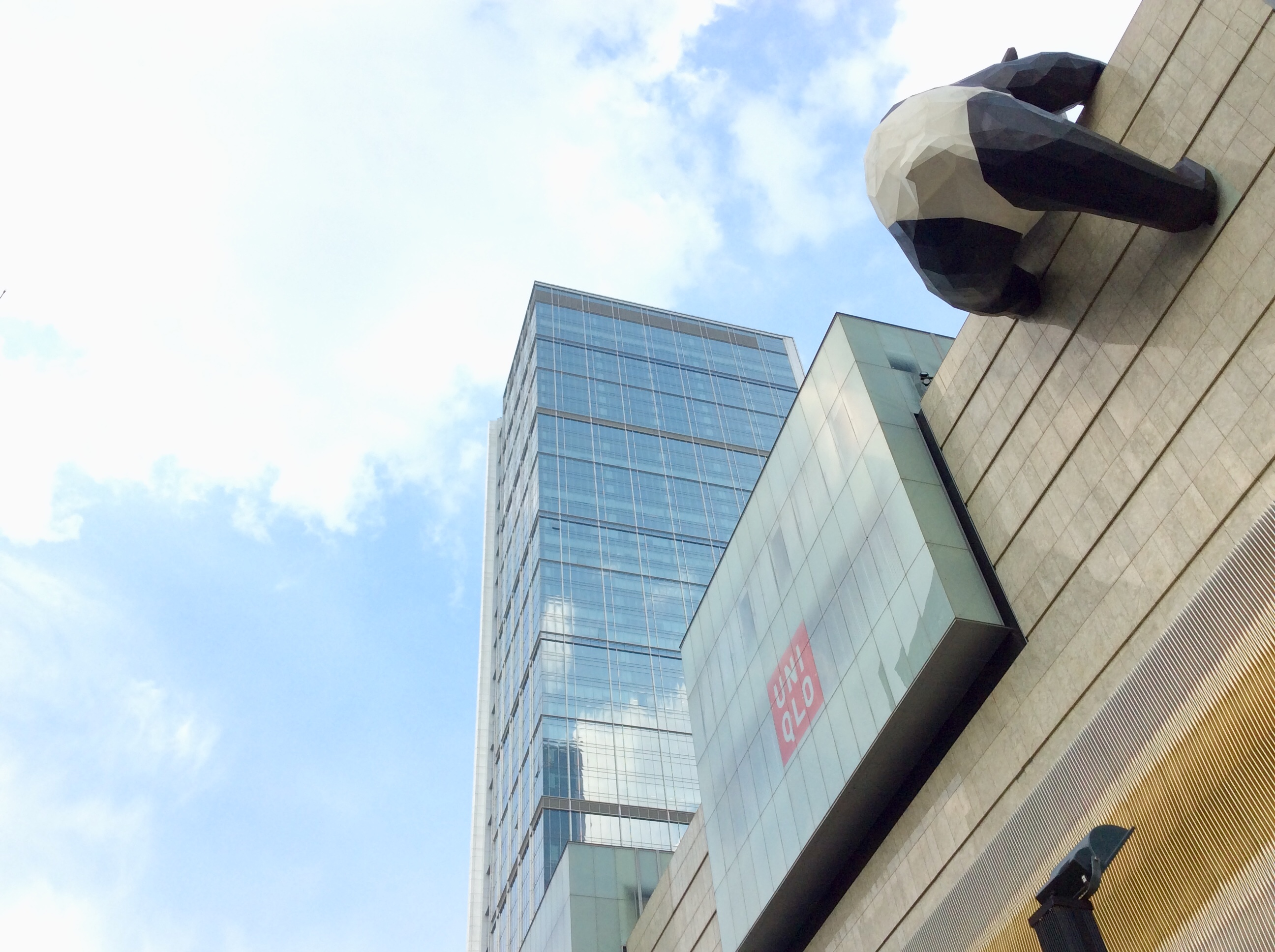
Back of the sculpture

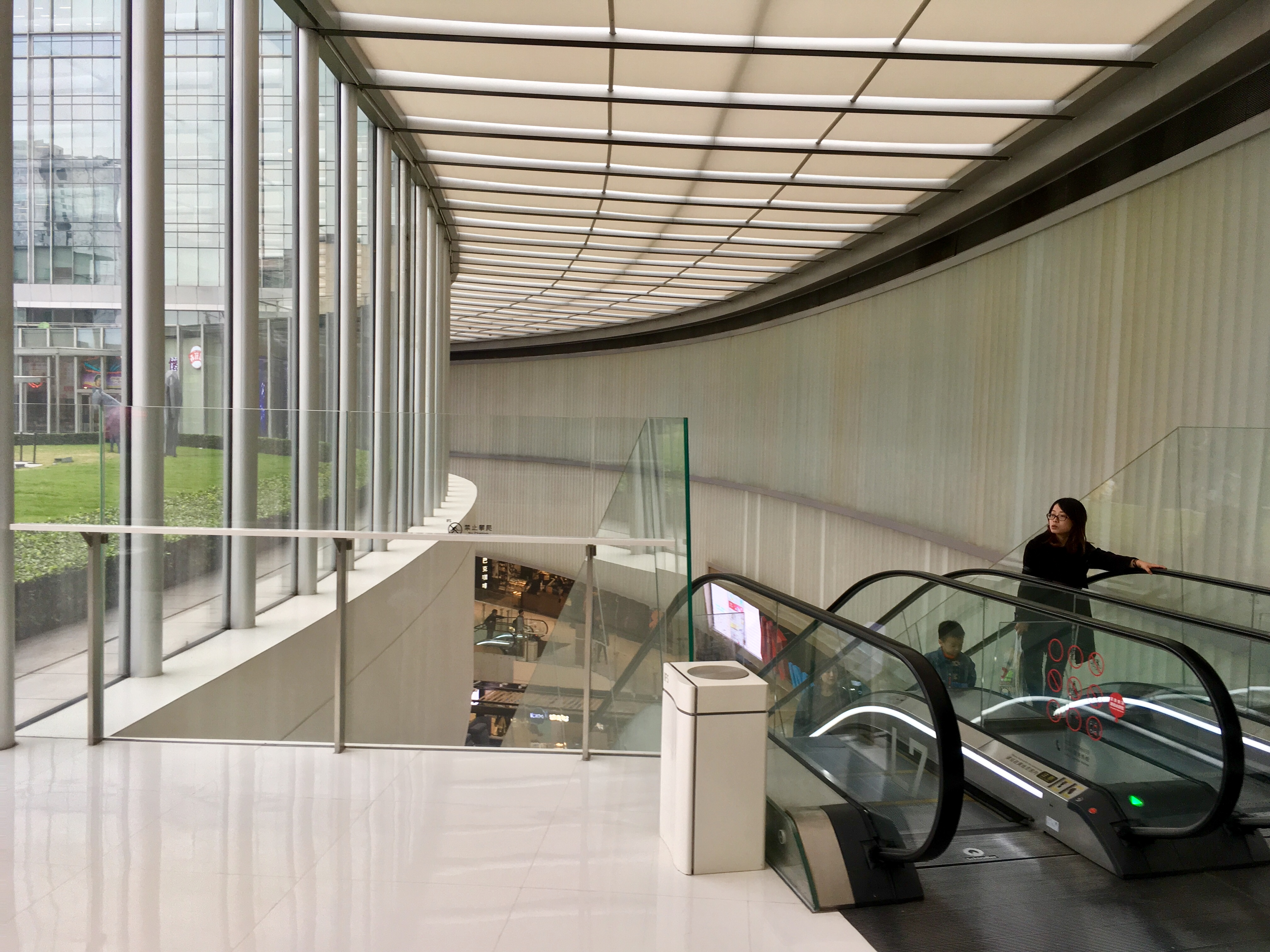
Sculpture Garden Entrance

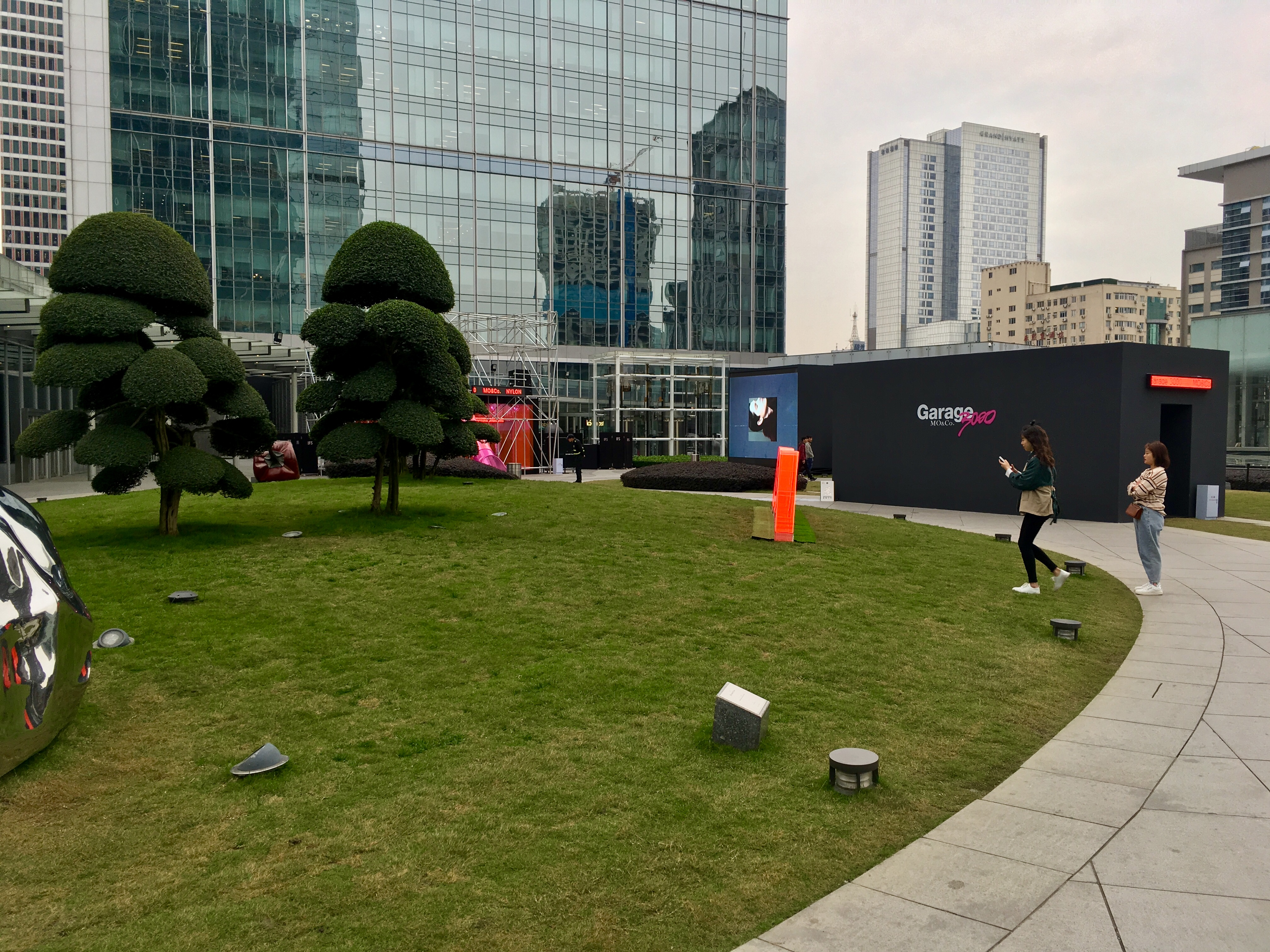
7th Floor Sculpture Garden

== Main buildings ==
Name	Image	Height m (ft)	Floors	Year	Function	Ref
Tower 1		247	50	2014	Office	
Tower 2		247	50	2014	Office	
Tower 4		198	46	2015	Residential	
Tower 3		188	48	2015	Hotel	

== See also ==
- List of tallest buildings in Chengdu
- List of tallest buildings in China
