= Hao Lin =

Chinese architect

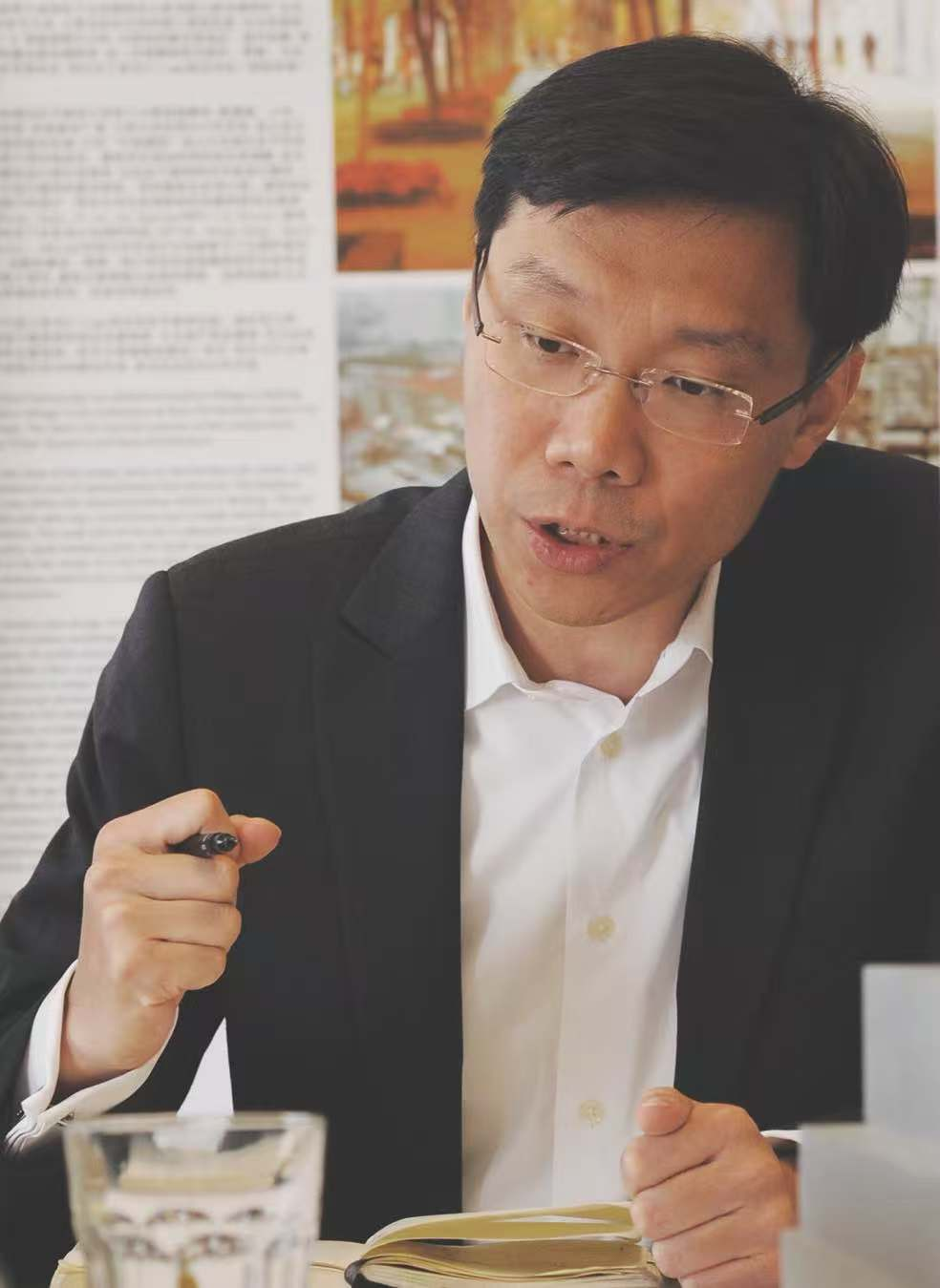
- Born: 1971 (age 54–55); Beijing, China
- Occupation: Architect
- Known for: Taikoo Li Chengdu, rural community buildings, eco hotels, urban regeneration

Hao Lin (Chinese: 郝琳; born 1971) is a Chinese architect. He is an Honorary Research Fellow of Tsinghua University Institute of Culture & Creativity, and a former Adjunct Associate Professor at the Faculty of Social Science, The Chinese University of Hong Kong.

== Early life and education ==
Hao Lin was born and grew up in Beijing. He received his Bachelor and Master of Architecture at Tsinghua University; Master of Architecture at University of California, Berkeley; and PhD in Architecture at the University of Cambridge. He is a Chartered Member of the Royal Institute of British Architects (RIBA).

== Career ==
From 2014 to 2020, Hao was an adjunct professor, teaching subjects such as socio-ecobalance and supervising postgraduate theses at the Faculty of Social Sciences, The Chinese University of Hong Kong.

From 2020 to 2023, he is Honorary Research Fellow of Tsinghua University Institute of Culture & Creativity.

Since 2020, he has been a Committee Member of the Professional Committee of Cultural Creativity of Tsinghua Alumni Association (CCTAA).

From 2008 to 2015, he took a lead of the overall master planning and architectural design of Taikoo Li Chengdu.

From 2008 to 2017, he led the pro bono-based design and development of two earthquake-relief community centre projects in the rural areas of Sichuan Province, working closely with the China Children and Teenagers' Fund (CCTF), donors, and local communities to support local rural revitalisation initiatives.

== Projects ==
- Taikoo Li Chengdu
- 1 Hotel Haitang Bay
- Innhouse Eco Hotel Kunming
- KPMG-CCTF Community Center
- Swire Bamboo Community Center
- Taikoo Li Xi'an

== Awards ==
- RIBA International Award, Innhouse Eco Hotel Kunming, 2012.
- WAF Award, Taikoo Li Chengdu, 2015.
- AIA Honor Awards for Architecture and Sustainability ( Hong Kong Chapter ), 1 Hotel Haitang Bay, 2024.
- HKIA Award outside Hong Kong - Commercial Building, 1 Hotel Haitang Bay, 2024.

== Academic publications ==
Hao lectured and published widely on urban regeneration, sustainable urbanism, and architecture. One of his books is Green Design for the Future (pinyin: Jiànzhù xiānfēng, Lǜjiàn wèilái; ISBN 9787503872808), published in 2014.
