= Chunxi Road =

Pedestrian street and CBD in Chengdu, China

- 春熙路
- Interactive map of Chunxi Road
- Location: Jinjiang, Chengdu, Sichuan, China

Construction
- Inauguration: 1924; 102 years ago

Other
- Known for: Commercial district

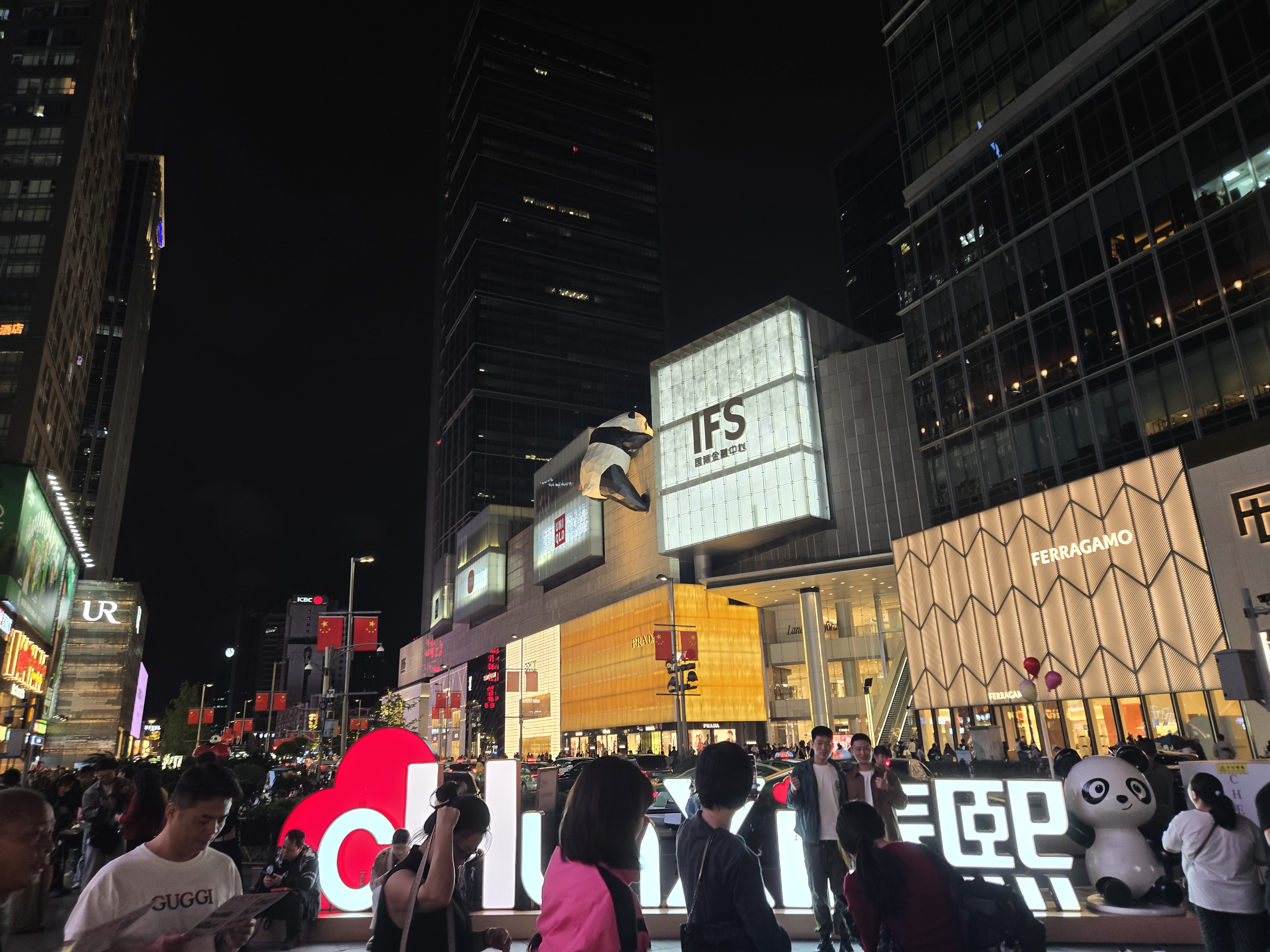
Chunxi Road at night (2025)

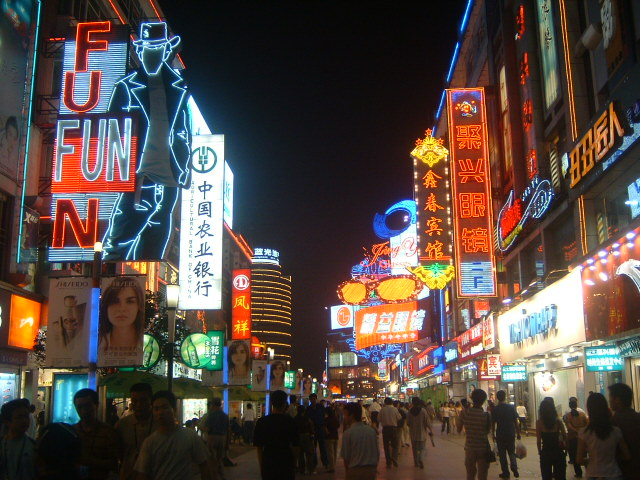
Chunxi Road in 2004

Chunxi Road (Chinese: 春熙路; pinyin: Chūnxī Lù) is a pedestrian street and the city's central business district located in Jinjiang District, central Chengdu, Sichuan, China. Established in 1924 to connect Chengdu's two main commercial areas at the time (Dongda Street and Shangye Chang), Chunxi Road has since evolved into the city's principal central business district. It is currently served by Chunxi Road station on Line 2 and Line 3 of the Chengdu Metro.

The name Chunxi was taken from a passage in the Tao Te Ching evoking a lively crowd and the arrival of spring, and was chosen to convey commercial prosperity and bustling pedestrian activity. The historic road consists of North, South, East, and West Chunxi Road, meeting around Zhongshan Square. The name is now also commonly applied to a much larger pedestrian, retail, dining, entertainment, and tourism district surrounding the original four streets.

In 2022, the Ministry of Culture and Tourism and the National Development and Reform Commission included the Chunxi Road area in the first group of National Tourism and Leisure Blocks. Later in 2022, the Ministry of Commerce designated the Chunxi Road business district as one of China's first National Demonstration Smart Business Districts.

== Layout and etymology ==
The original Chunxi Road is a group of four interconnected streets, which are Chunxi North Road (春熙北路), Chunxi South Road (春熙南路), Chunxi East Road (春熙东路), and Chunxi West Road (春熙西路), centered on Zhongshan Square (中山广场). It lies between the historic commercial areas around Zongfu Road (总府路) to the north and Dongda Street (东大街) to the south. The modern tourism and leisure district extends beyond the four named streets. An official description issued when the area received national tourism status placed the pedestrian district between Shudu Avenue (蜀都大道) in the north and Dongda Street in the south, with Beixin Street to the west and Shamao Street (纱帽街) to the east. Its main pedestrian routes total approximately 1,840 m (1.14 mi), and the designated district covers about 274,000 m^{2} (68 acres).

The name Chunxi derives from chapter 20 of the Tao Te Ching. The term combines ideas of springtime warmth and bustling prosperity and was intended to evoke crowds gathering in a flourishing commercial district.

Historical accounts differ over the street's earliest name. Some local histories state that it was initially called Senwei Road (森威路), after the honorific title "Senwei General" held by Sichuan military ruler Yang Sen, and was renamed after his political position weakened. Other accounts state that "Senwei Road" was proposed but rejected, after which scholar Jiang Ziyu (江子虞) selected the name Chunxi Road. A study of historical maps held by the Chengdu Municipal Archives found that Chunxi Road first appeared by that name on a Chengdu map published in 1925.

== History ==
=== Origins ===
Before Chunxi Road was constructed, two of central Chengdu's most important commercial areas lay close to one another but were poorly connected. Dongda Street (东大街) had long been one of the city's major shopping streets, while the Shangye Chang (商业场) developed to the north in the late Qing dynasty. The latter opened in 1909 as the Chengdu Industrial Promotion Market (成都劝业场) and soon became an important concentration of shops and entertainment businesses.

Between Dongda Street and the Shangye Chang were narrow lanes, former government compounds, and irregularly built shops. After taking control of Chengdu in 1924, Yang Sen pursued a program of municipal modernization that included road construction. He ordered a broad new street opened through the area to connect the two commercial centers. Construction began in May 1924, and the new road was substantially complete by August.

The project initially created a north–south route, followed by east–west branches. Local historical sources describe the early roadway as approximately 9 m (30 ft) wide, with sidewalks of about 2 m (6.6 ft). Its four sections did not meet in exact straight lines, producing the offset intersection around the central square that remains characteristic of the street plan.

=== Republican period ===
Commercial development followed rapidly. Banks, jewelers, pharmacies, watchmakers, clothing stores, restaurants, bookstores, and entertainment businesses opened along the street. A 1934 survey counted 157 businesses on Chunxi Road, including branches of several banks and prominent regional and national retailers. By the 1930s and 1940s, Chunxi Road had become an important commercial and financial center in Chengdu.

A small public space was created at the junction of the four road sections. A monument commemorating construction of Chunxi Road originally stood there. A standing statue of Sun Yat-sen was later erected on the monument in the late 1920s. It was subsequently replaced by a seated bronze statue designed by sculptor Liu Kaiqu (刘开渠). The present statue depicts Sun in traditional dress holding a copy of his political writings and is one of the best-known historic features of the street. The square surrounding it is known as Zhongshan Square.

Chunxi Road was also associated with Chengdu's developing popular culture. Cinemas, bookstores, restaurants, and other cultural businesses joined its retail establishments, making the street an important center of urban leisure as well as commerce.

=== From 1949 to the 2000s ===
Following the establishment of the People's Republic of China in 1949, Chunxi Road remained an important retail street. Commercial activity expanded further following China's economic reforms. During the 1980s, the nearby Qingnian Road market became an important concentration of small private retailers. Chunxi Road's first modern night market opened in September 1992. Foreign-invested and national department stores entered the district during the 1990s, further changing its retail character.

A large-scale reconstruction of the Chunxi Road commercial district began in 2001. The project ended the street's night market, reconstructed road surfaces and public spaces, and converted the core area into a modern pedestrian shopping district. The renovated pedestrian street opened in 2002, drawing approximately 100,000 visitors on its opening day according to provincial historical records.

The redevelopment introduced broad pedestrian paving, public seating and landscaping, lighting, sculptures, and larger retail spaces. It also strengthened links between Chunxi Road and surrounding shopping streets, gradually shifting the meaning of "Chunxi Road" from the four historic streets to a wider commercial district.

=== Expansion of the commercial district ===
The district underwent another period of major redevelopment during the 2010s. Chengdu IFS (Chengdu International Finance Square) opened at Hongxing Road and Daci Temple Road in January 2014 as a large mixed-use retail, office, hotel, and residential complex. The development became associated with the 15-meter-tall public artwork I Am Here, a giant panda sculpture by Australian artist Lawrence Argent that appears to climb the building's facade.

Immediately east of the original Chunxi Road area, Taikoo Li Chengdu formally opened in April 2015. It was developed around the historic Daci Temple and features a low-rise, open-air layout with lanes, courtyards, and public squares. It incorporates preserved historic buildings alongside contemporary retail architecture. It received a 2015 Urban Land Institute Global Award for Excellence.

The development of IFS and Taikoo Li strengthened the connection between the historic pedestrian street and the Daci Temple–Hongxing Road area. By the 2020s, government planning documents treated Chunxi Road, Taikoo Li–IFS, Dongda Street, Yanshikou, and adjacent neighborhoods as components of a broader Chunxi Road fashion business district.

== Commercial and cultural significance ==
Chunxi Road has retained a prominent place in Chengdu's commercial culture since the 1920s. Its early merchants introduced new forms of retailing and advertising to the city. Businesses on the street were among Chengdu's early adopters of neon signs and amplified advertising, while restaurants and Western-style dining establishments contributed to changing urban consumption patterns.

The district combines department stores, shopping malls, flagship stores, restaurants, cafes, cinemas, bookstores, hotels, and smaller street-facing businesses. Older local businesses coexist with national and international retail brands, reflecting the district's successive stages of development from a Republican-era commercial street to a contemporary shopping and tourism area.

In January 2022, the Ministry of Culture and Tourism and the National Development and Reform Commission designated the Chunxi Road area as one of China's first 54 National Tourism and Leisure Blocks. The designation is given to urban districts combining cultural identity with tourism, recreation, dining, entertainment, shopping, accommodation, and public services. In December 2022, the Ministry of Commerce designated the Chunxi Road commercial district as one of the country's first 12 National Demonstration Smart Business Districts.

The Sichuan provincial government and Chengdu municipal government have subsequently identified the Chunxi Road–Taikoo Li commercial area as a priority commercial and tourism district in plans for Chengdu's development as an international consumption center.

In 2024, Chunxi Road marked the centenary of its construction. Contemporary coverage by Economic Daily, Xinhua News Agency, Guangming Daily, and other national media described its transformation from a single commercial street into a larger commercial, cultural, and business district.

== Landmarks ==
=== Zhongshan Square ===
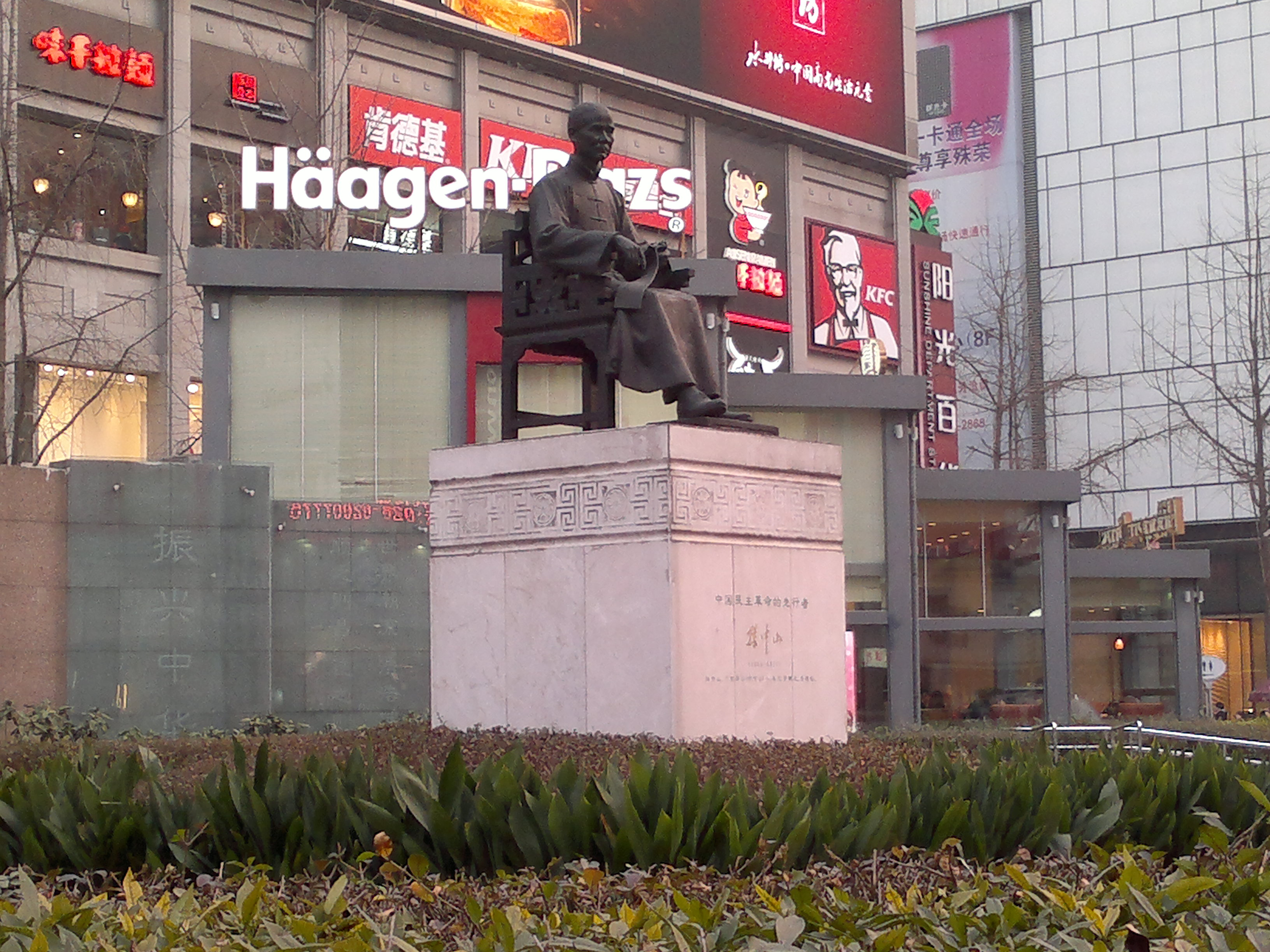
Statue of Sun Yat-sen at Zhongshan Square (2012)

Zhongshan Square (中山广场) lies near the intersection of the four historic sections of Chunxi Road. Its principal landmark is the bronze seated statue of Sun Yat-sen designed by Liu Kaiqu. An earlier standing statue had been erected on the Chunxi Road construction monument in the late 1920s. Historical photographs collected by the Chengdu Library have helped document the relationship between the earlier statue and the original road monument.

The replacement statue depicts Sun seated in a long traditional robe and holding his writings on national reconstruction. It has remained a visual focal point of Chunxi Road through later redevelopments of the surrounding square.

=== Chengdu IFS ===
Chengdu IFS (成都国际金融中心; formally known as Chengdu International Finance Square) is a mixed-use skyscraper complex that stands on Hongxing Road (红星路) at the eastern edge of the traditional Chunxi Road pedestrian area. The complex opened in 2014. Its best-known exterior feature is Lawrence Argent's I Am Here, a 15 m (49 ft) giant panda sculpture whose body hangs on the facade while its head is visible from an upper-level terrace. The work has become widely associated with the modern visual identity of the Chunxi Road area.

=== Taikoo Li and Daci Temple ===
Taikoo Li Chengdu lies east of Chunxi Road around Daci Temple. The development combines contemporary low-rise retail buildings with historic structures, lanes, courtyards, and open plazas. Its design was intended to respond to traditional Sichuan urban architecture and the historic setting of the temple.

The project opened fully in 2015 and helped extend the principal pedestrian and retail activity of the Chunxi Road area eastward into the Daci Temple area.

== Transportation ==
The Chunxi Road area is served by Chunxi Road station on the Chengdu Metro. Line 2 began serving the district when it opened in September 2012. Line 3 opened in July 2016, making Chunxi Road station an interchange station between the two lines. The station has pedestrian connections to major commercial properties in the district, while numerous municipal transit bus routes serve surrounding streets.

The pedestrianization of the historic core and later development of adjacent malls have created a network of street-level and underground pedestrian routes linking Chunxi Road, Hongxing Road, Chengdu IFS, Taikoo Li, and neighboring shopping streets.

== See also ==
- Jinjiang, Chengdu
- Taikoo Li Chengdu
- Daci Temple
- Chunxi Road station
