= Daci Temple =

Buddhist temple in Chengdu, China

- 大慈寺
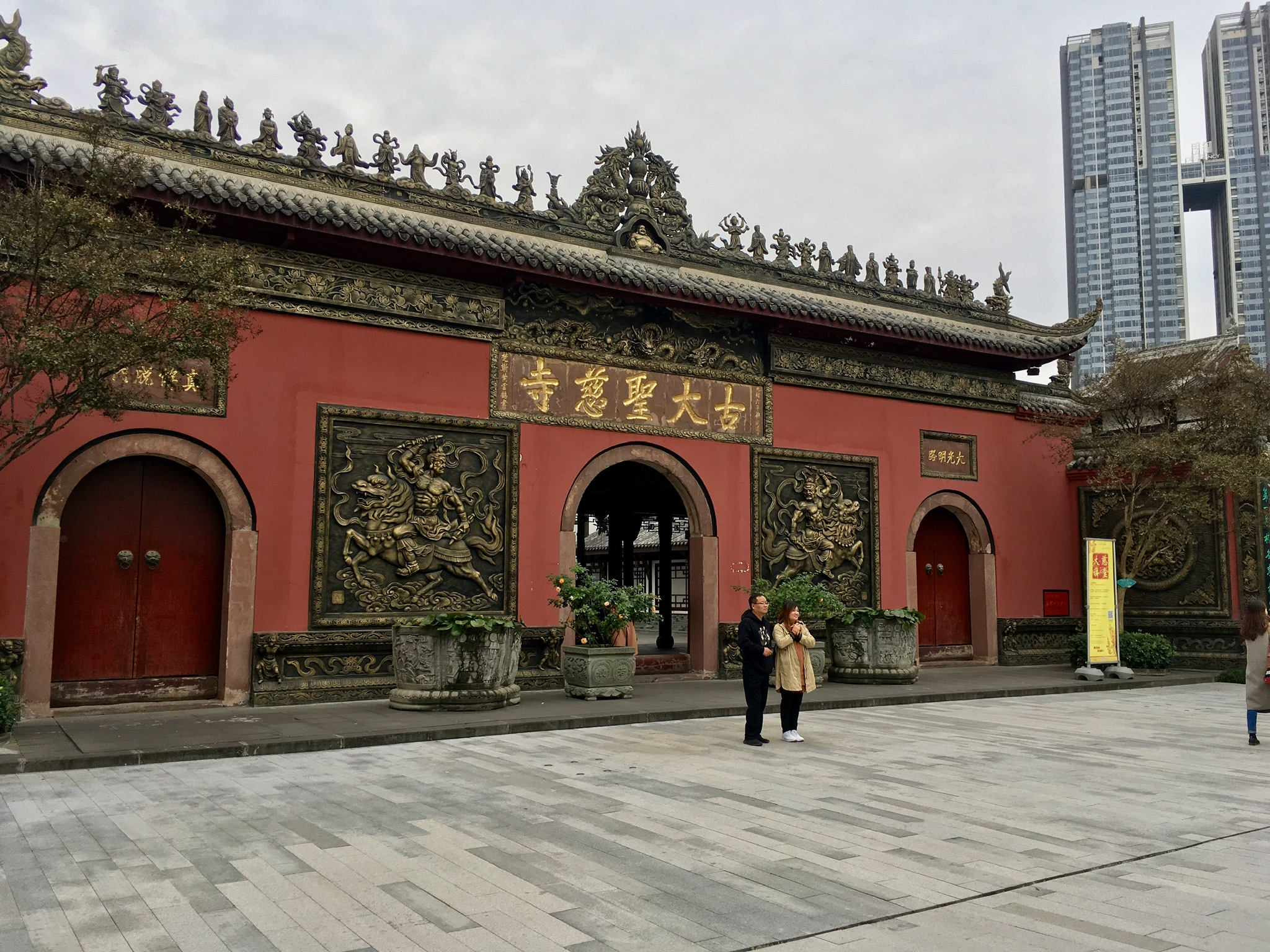
- Shanmen at Da'ci Temple.

- Location within Sichuan

Religion
- Affiliation: Buddhism
- Deity: Chan Buddhism

Location
- Location: Chengdu, Sichuan
- Country: China
- Coordinates: 30°39′21.31″N 104°04′50.29″E

Architecture
- Style: Chinese architecture
- Established: 3rd century
- Completed: 1867 (reconstruction)

Daci Temple (Chinese: 大慈寺; pinyin: Dàcí Sì; lit. 'Temple of Infinite Compassion and Mercy') is a Buddhist temple located in Jinjiang, Chengdu, Sichuan, China.

== History ==
=== Wei and Jin dynasties ===
The original temple dates back to the 3rd century. According to Wu Deng Hui Yuan (五灯会元), in the Wei and Jin dynasties, Indian Buddhist monk Baozhang (宝掌) came to Sichuan to worship Samantabhadra and lived in Da'ci Temple.

=== Tang dynasty ===
In 622, during the Tang dynasty (618–907), Xuanzang (602–664) received full ordination at Daci Temple. In 756, An Lushan (703–757) seized the capital city Chang'an, and Emperor Xuanzong (685–762) was evacuated to Chengdu. When he saw monks of Daci Temple giving food to the poor in the street, he was deeply moved and inscribed and honored the name "Dashengci Temple". Emperor Xuanzong issued a decree to rebuild the temple, and Master Wuxiang (无相), a prince of Silla, supervised its reconstruction. In 822, Master Zhixuan (知玄) settled at the temple to deliver Buddhist precepts there, and attracted large numbers of practitioners. Emperor Wuzong of Tang (814–846) gave an order to demolish Buddhist temples, confiscate temple lands and force monks to return to secular life. Because the temple had the handwriting of the former Emperor Xuanzong, it was exceptionally spared and became the only Buddhist temple in the area.

=== Song dynasty ===
In the Southern Song dynasty (1127–1279), Lanxi Daolong (1213–1278) received ordination as a monk at the temple. In 1246, he took his disciples to Japan, and founded the Kenchō-ji sect in Japan.

=== Ming dynasty ===
In 1435, in the 10th year of Xuande period (1399–1435) in the Ming dynasty (1368–1644), a disastrous fire destroyed most of the buildings.

=== Qing dynasty ===
Daci Temple was reconstructed during the Shunzhi era (1368–1661) of the Qing dynasty (1644–1911). It was renovated and refurbished in 1867, during the reign of Tongzhi Emperor (1856–1875).

=== People's Republic of China ===
Daci Temple was designated as a municipal-level cultural heritage site in Chengdu in 1981 and as a provincial cultural heritage site in 2007. It was used as a location for Chengdu Museum, which opened in 1984. At the end of 2003, Daci Temple was restored and was officially opened to the public on April 8 of the following year. On June 25, 2005, monk Da'en (大恩和尚) was proposed as the new abbot of the temple. The low-rise Sino-Ocean Taikoo Li Chengdu complex which opened in April 2015 was built surrounding the temple in keeping with traditional Sichuan architecture.
