= Taikoo Li Chengdu =

Coordinates: 30°39′21″N 104°04′50″E

Sino-Ocean Taikoo Li Chengdu
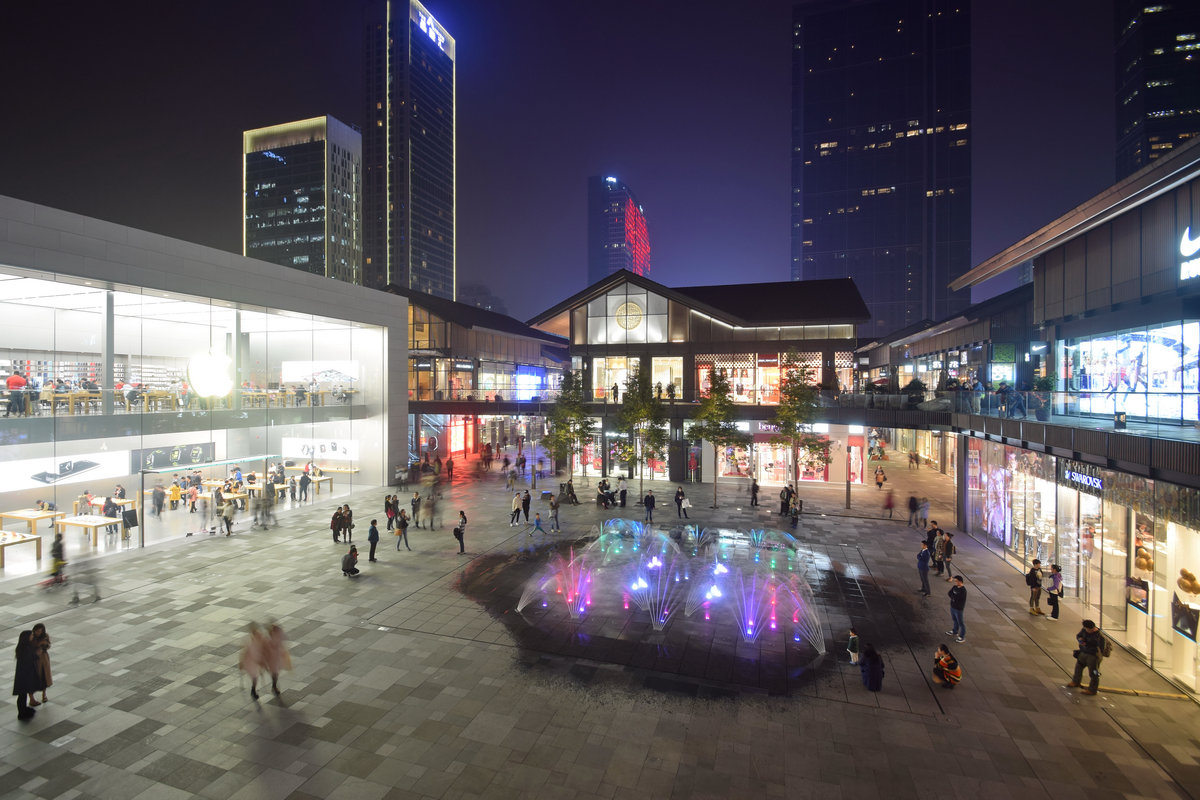
- View of the East Plaza at Taikoo Li Chengdu
- Location: Jinjiang District, Chengdu, China
- Address: No.8 Middle Shamao Street
- Opened: 2015
- Developer: Swire Properties, Sino-Ocean Group
- Num. of stores: Approximately 300 shops and restaurants
- Floor area: Total floor area of approximately 1,310,000 sq ft (122,000 m^{2})
- Parking: 1,000 parking spaces
- Website: www.soltklcd.com/en

Taikoo Li Chengdu (Chinese: 成都太古里) is a mixed-use development located in the Jinjiang District of Chengdu, near the Chunxi Road shopping district. It is a large-scale development of over 2.86 million sq ft (over 265,000 m^{2}) and consists of an open air, 'lane-driven' mall, a boutique hotel - ‘The Temple House’ with 100 guest rooms and 42 serviced apartments, and a Grade-A office tower - ‘Pinnacle One’.

== Location ==
Taikoo Li Chengdu is located in the Jinjiang District, the city's core business and retail center, and is home to many international banks. The complex is accessible from the Chengdu Metro, and is served by Metro Lines 2 and 3 as well as the Chunxi Road interchange station. It is located next to the 1,600-year-old Daci Temple which was preserved as part of the construction.

== History and construction ==
The center opened in April 2015, and features a pedestrianized precinct built around six restored heritage buildings including the Daci temple complex and Huguang Guild Hall. In keeping with Chengdu's heritage, the pedestrianized area contains both "slow lanes" for tea rooms, restaurants and boutiques, as well as "fast lanes" which contain major international brands such as Muji. Underneath the complex there are 1,000 parking spaces, direct metro access, as well as a cinema, a supermarket and a 4,000-square-meter (43,000 sq ft) Fangsuo bookstore. Following completion, the development was selected as a global winner in the 2015 Urban Land Institute Global Awards for Excellence competition. The shopping district brings together a range of top fashion and lifestyle brands such as Gucci, Cartier, Hermès, Ralph Lauren, Versace, Valentino, Thom Browne, Balmain, Givenchy, Acne Studios, I.T, Michael Kors, and B&O.

== Gallery ==
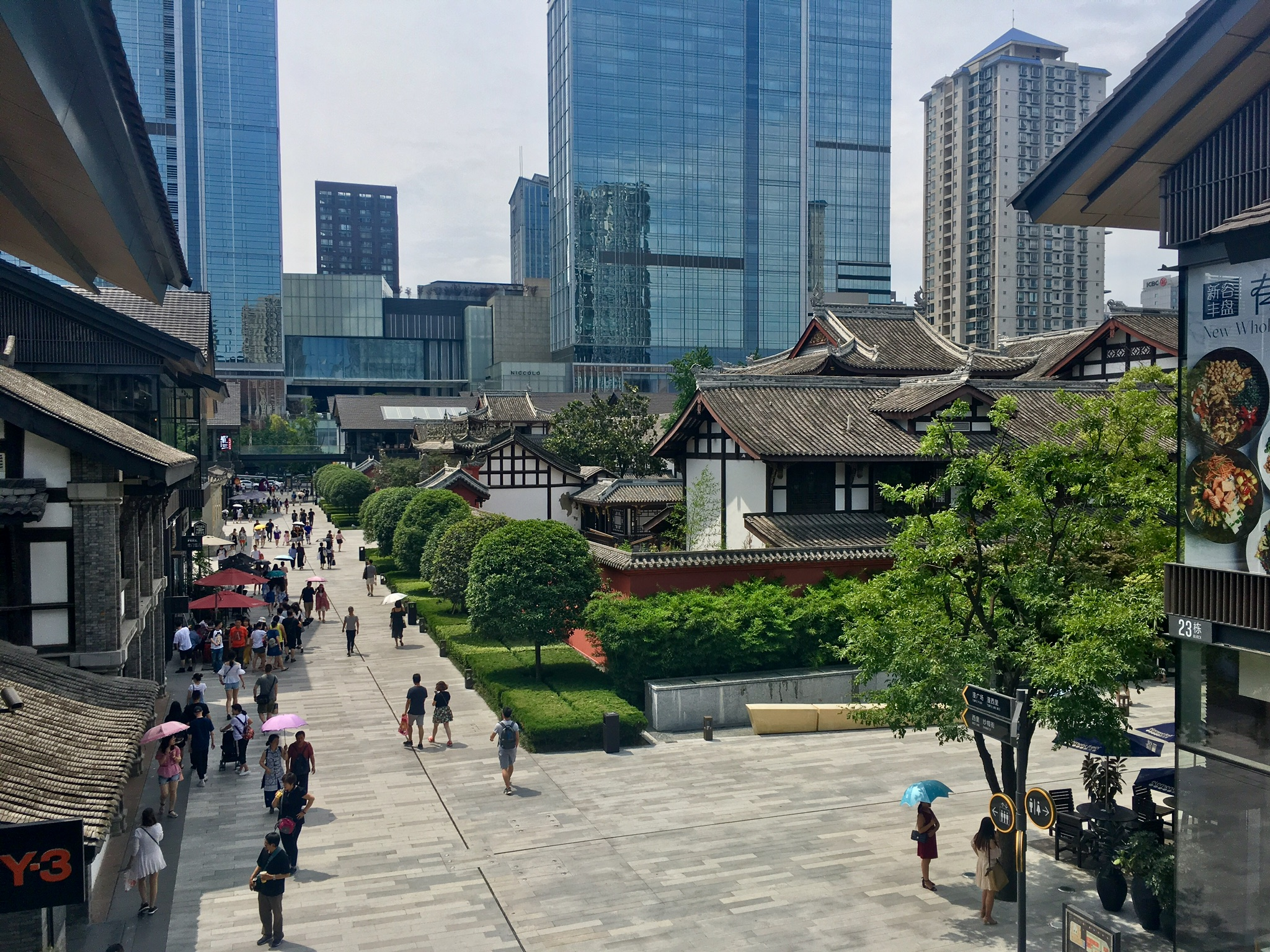
A view of Temple Plaza near the Daci Temple

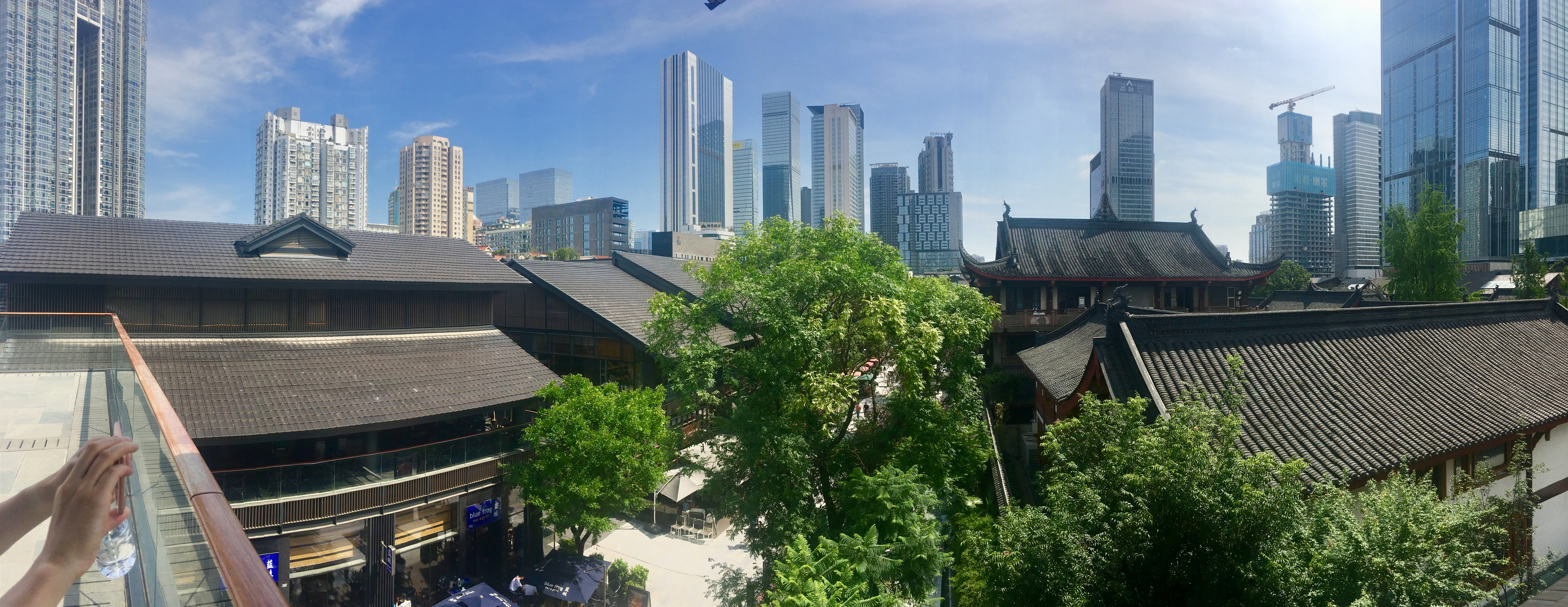
A panorama of Sino-Ocean Taikoo Li Chengdu from next to the MUJI store

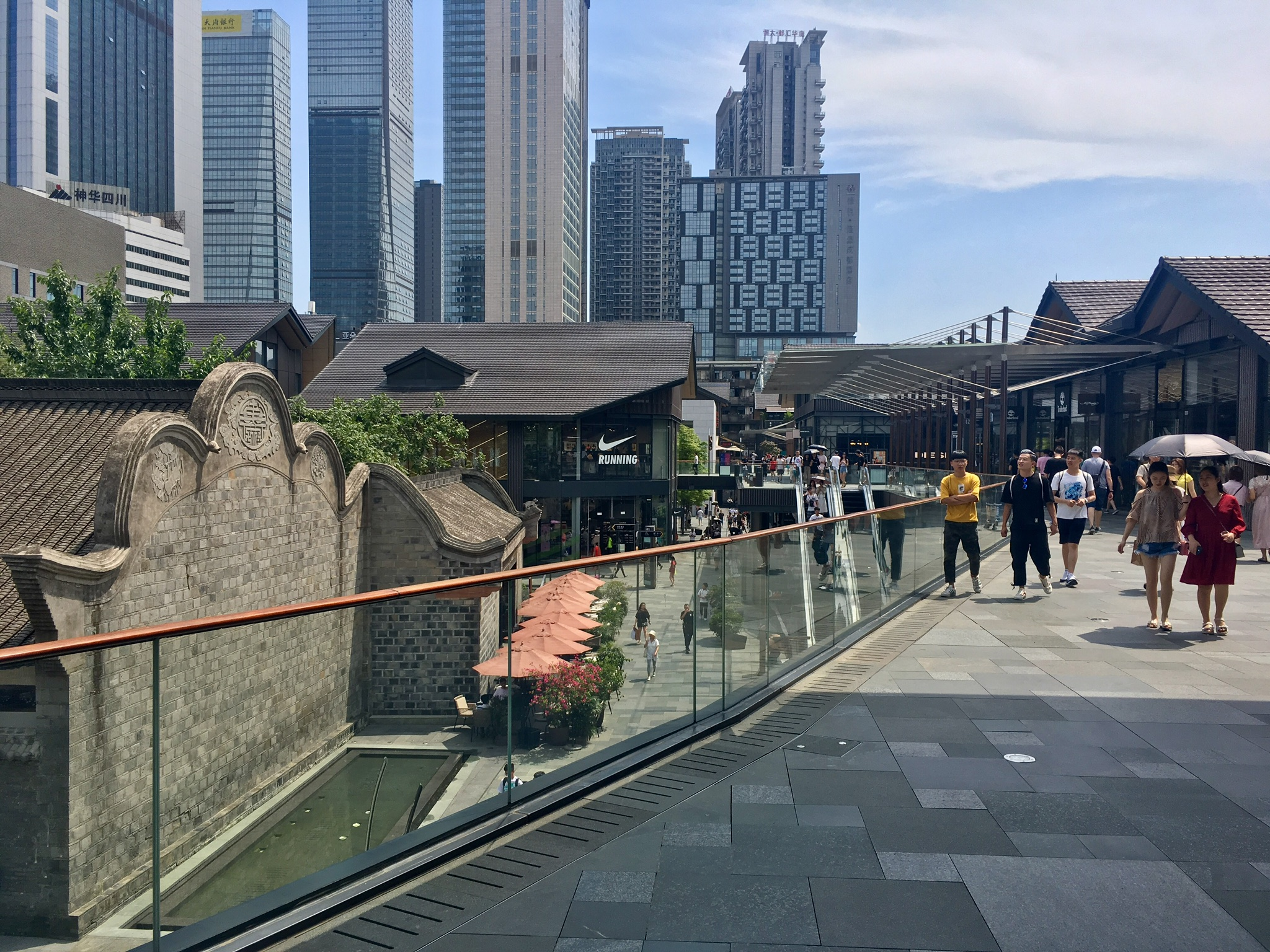
An example of one of the raised 'lanes'
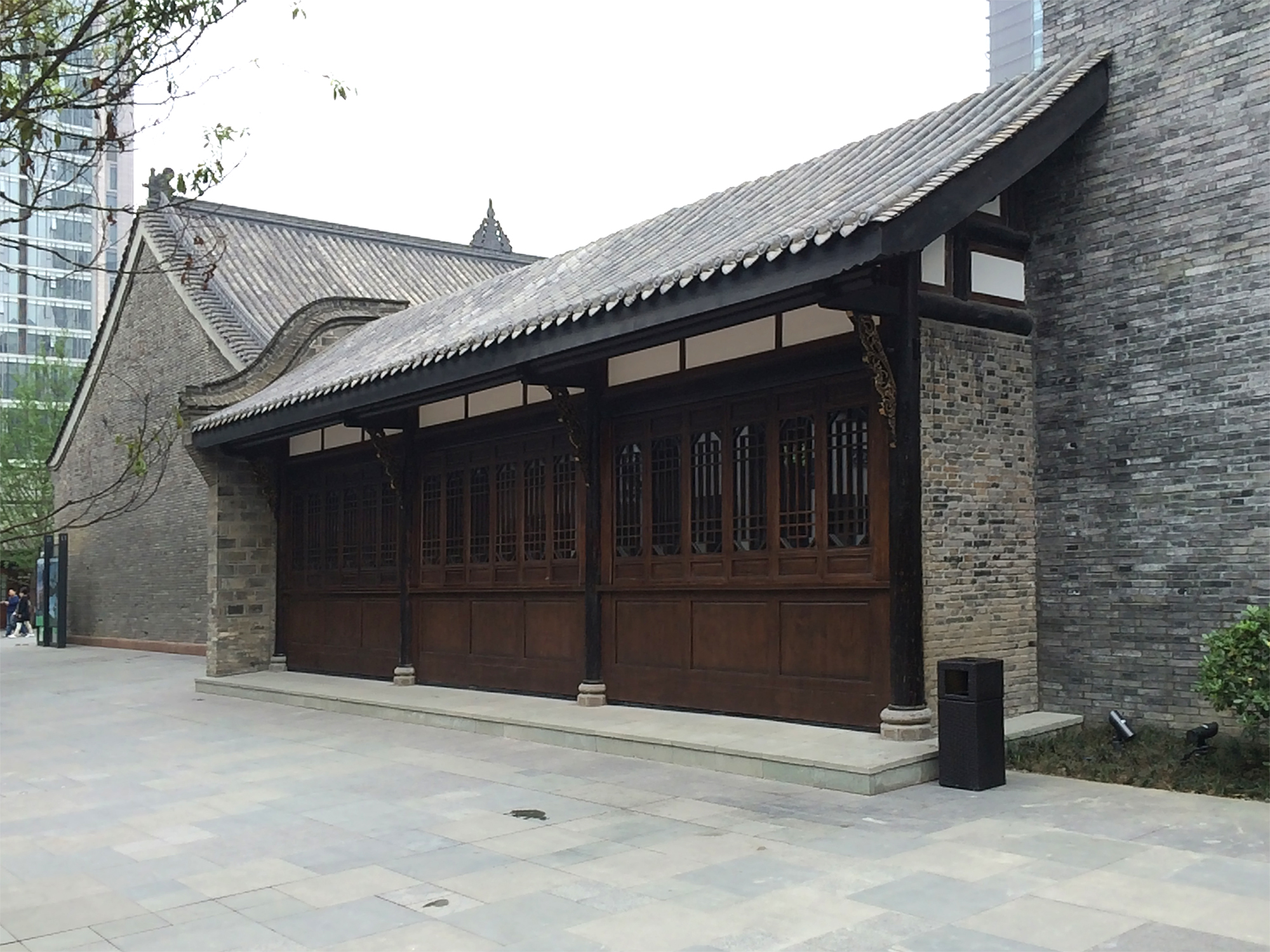
The renovated Guangdong Hall now used for events

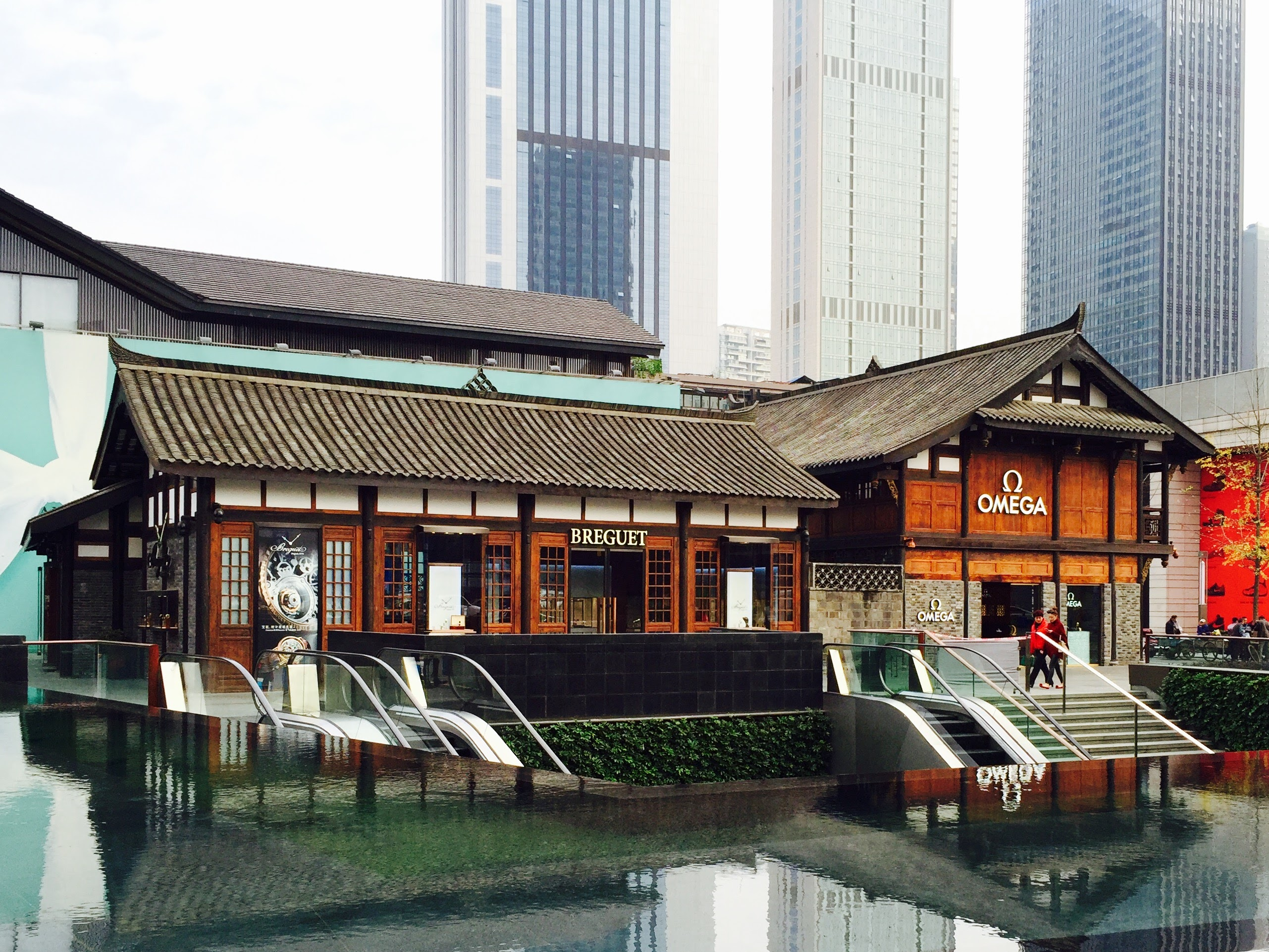
The renovated Xin Yau historical building

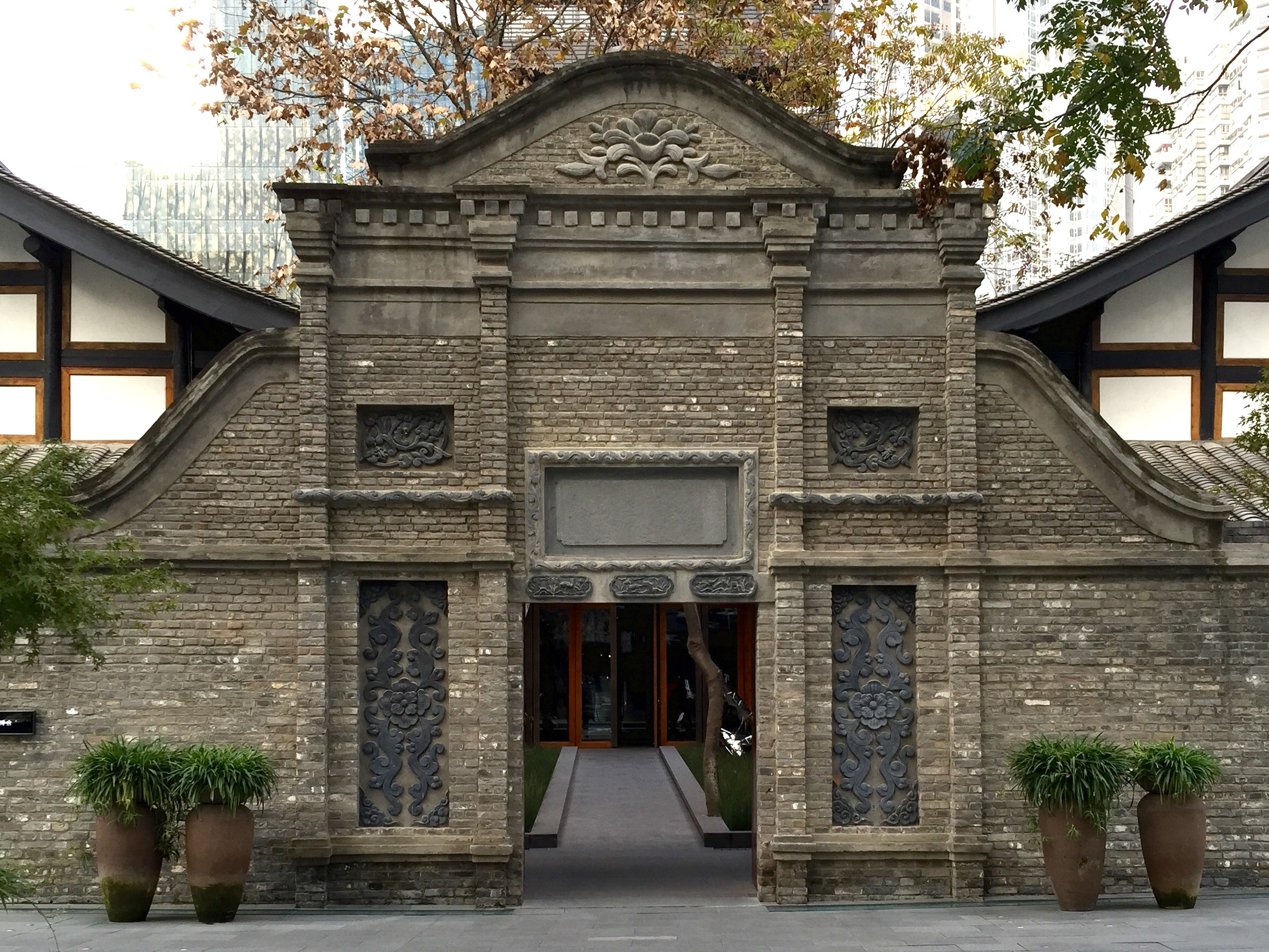
The entrance to The Temple House Hotel
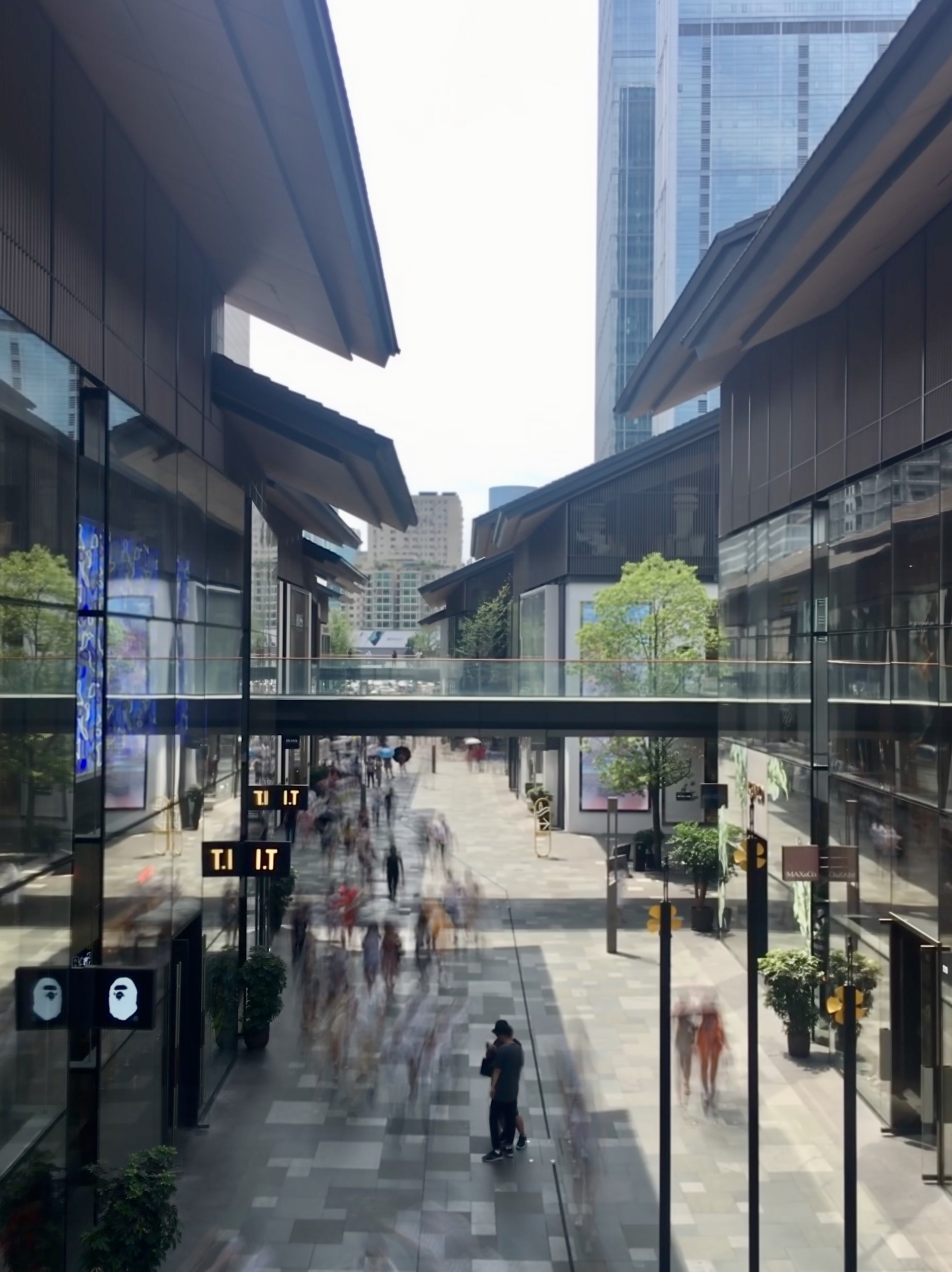
The Main Street

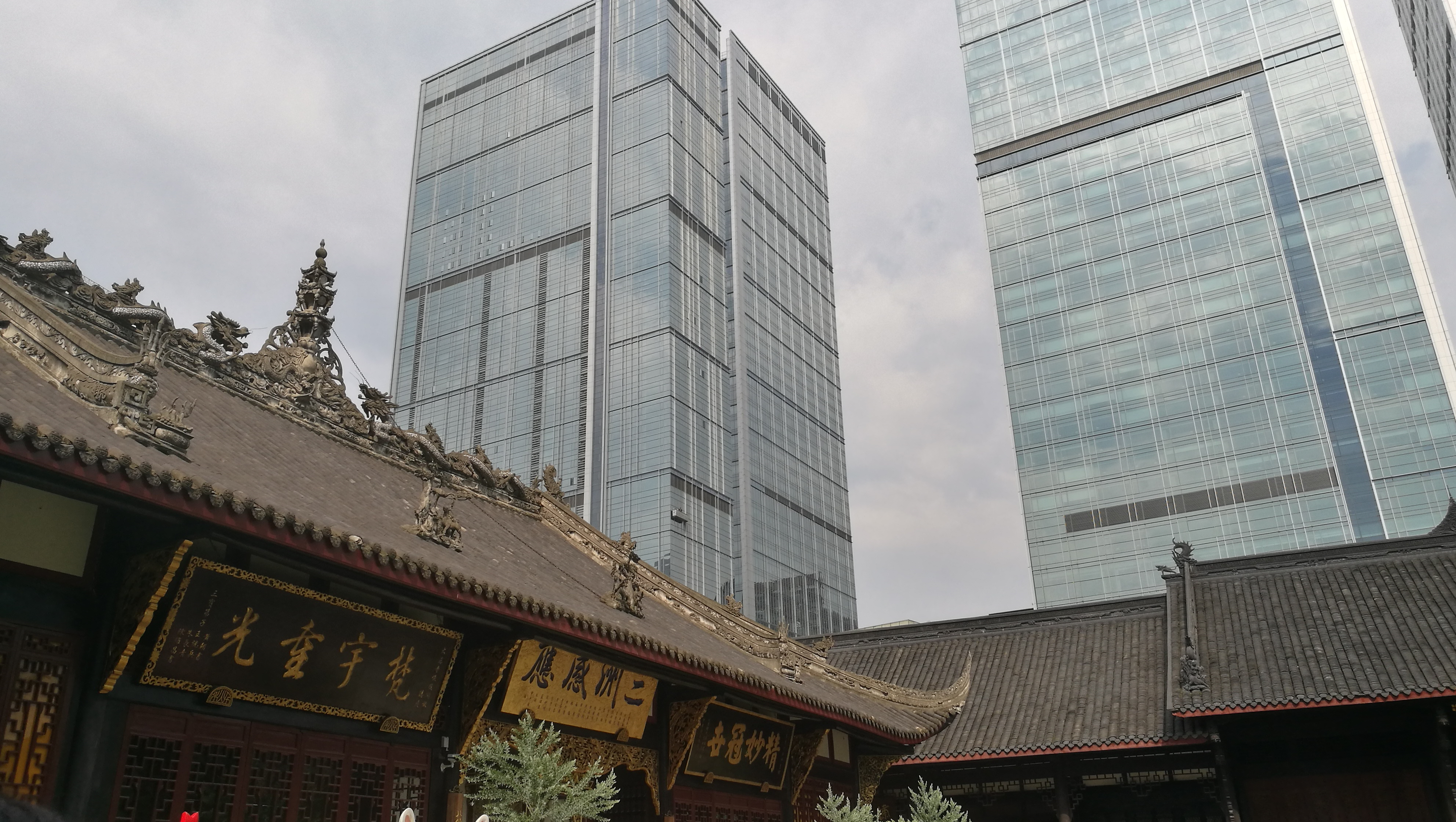
A view from the Daci Temple within Sino-Ocean Taikoo Li Chengdu with the Chengdu International Finance Square in the background

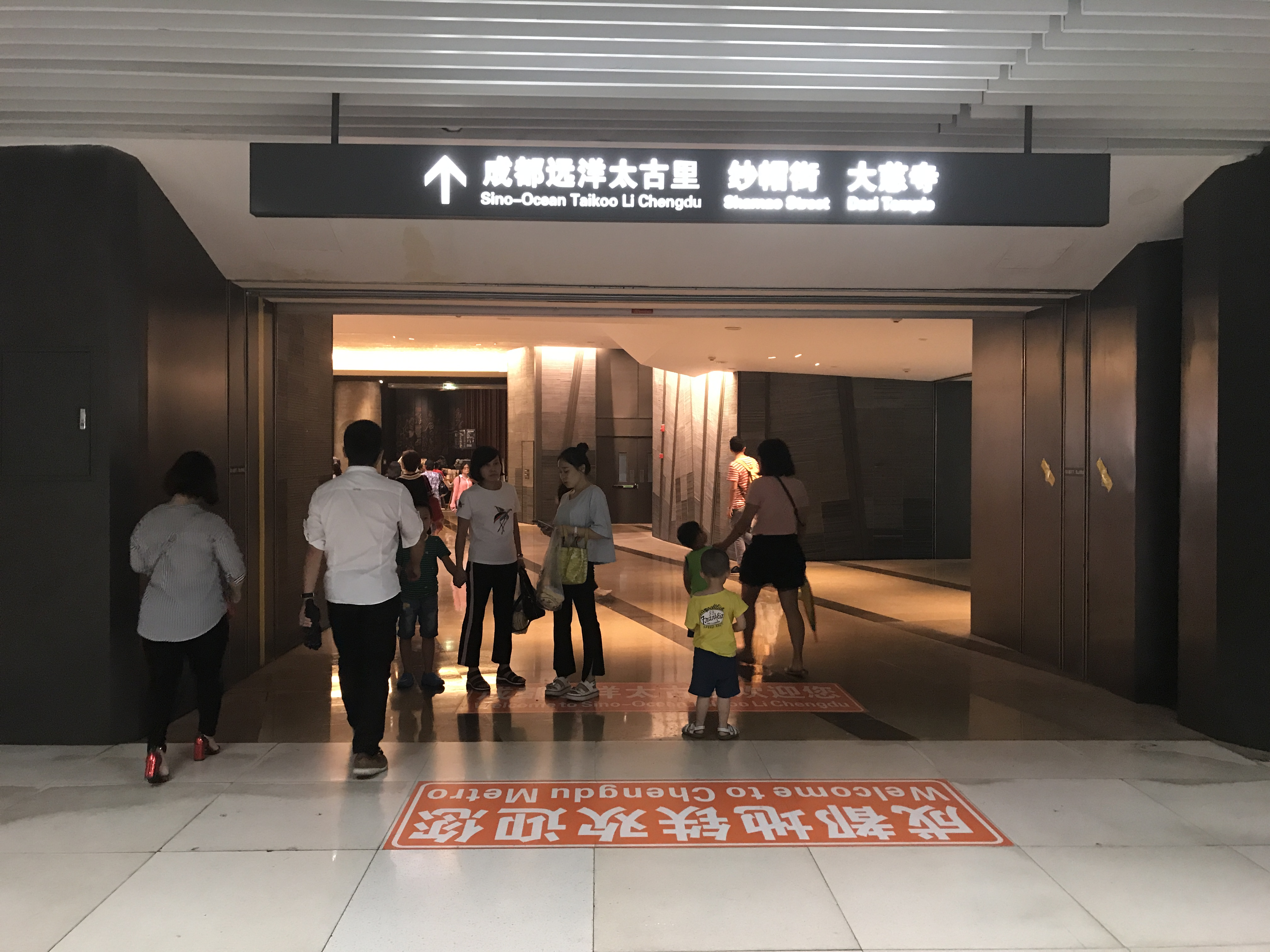
Direct access to Chengdu metro and Chunxi Road Station

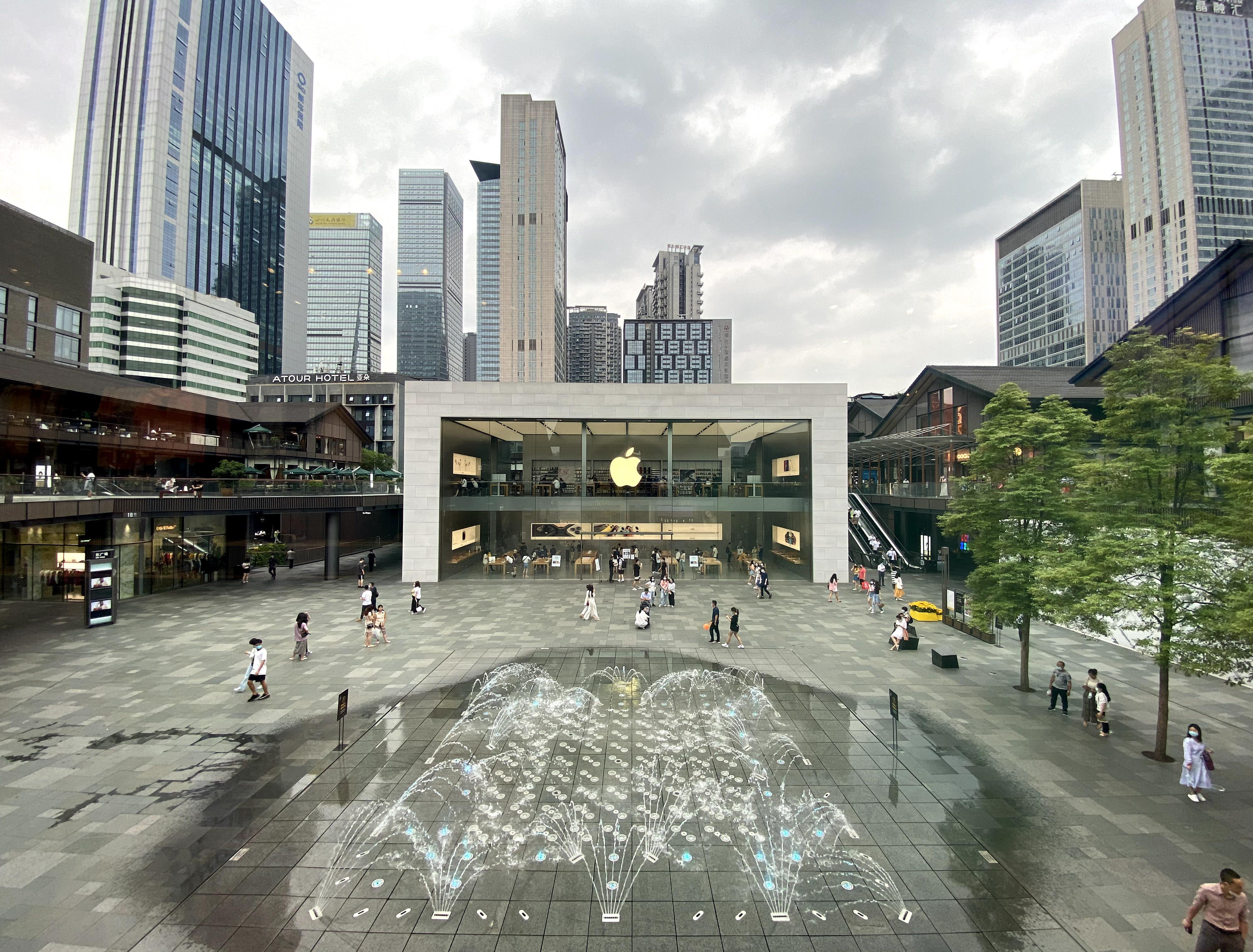
Apple Store Taikoo Li Chengdu
