= Jinjiang, Chengdu =

Provincial seat of Sichuan, China

Jinjiang 锦江区
- District
- District of Jinjiang, City of Chengdu
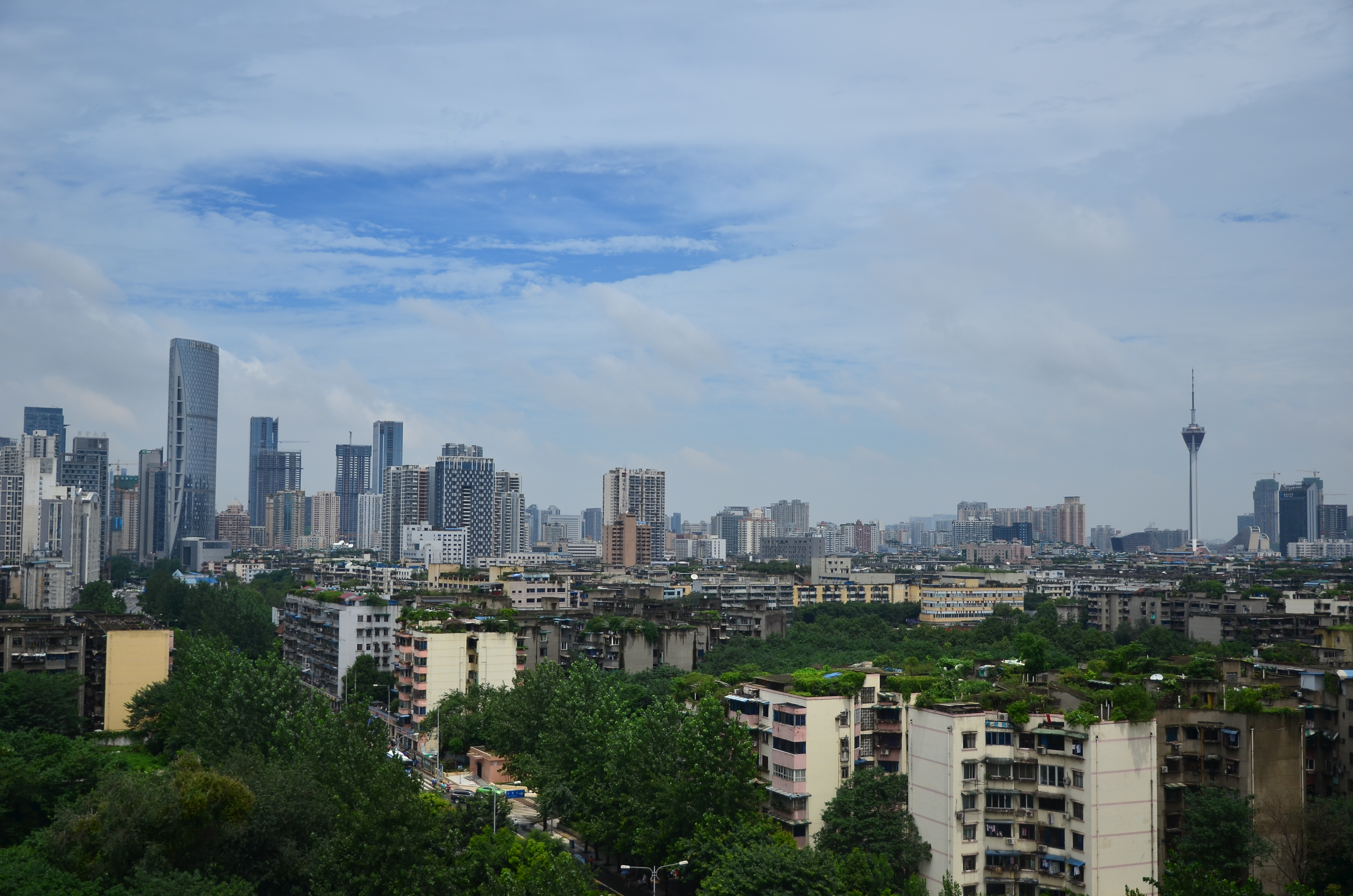

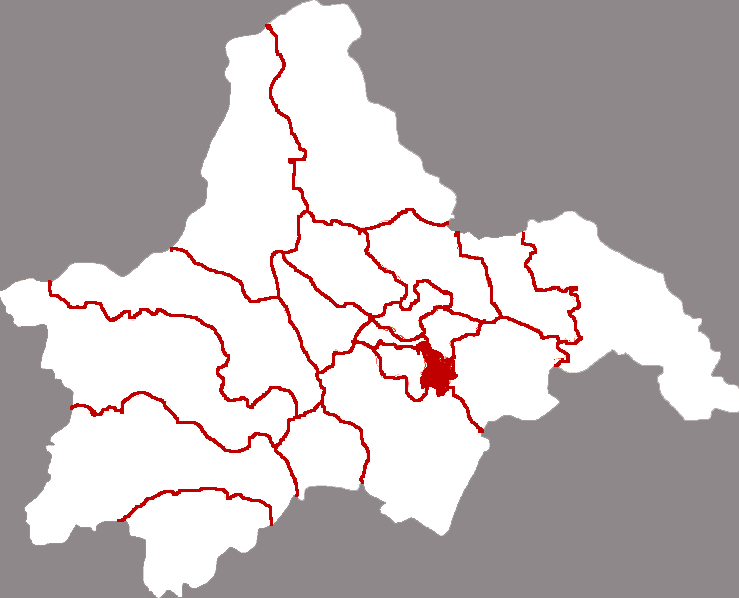
- Location of Jinjiang in Chengdu

- Location in Sichuan
- Coordinates: 30°36′30″N 104°06′57″E
- Country: China
- Province: Sichuan
- Sub-provincial city: Chengdu
- District seat: Chenglonglu Subdistrict

Area
  - Total: 62.12 km^{2} (23.98 sq mi)

Population (2020 census)
  - Total: 902,933
  - Density: 14,540/km^{2} (37,650/sq mi)
- Time zone: UTC+8 (China Standard)
- Website: cdjinjiang.gov.cn

Jinjiang District (Chinese: 锦江区; pinyin: Jǐnjiāng Qū) is a central urban district of Chengdu and the provincial seat of Sichuan, China. Jinjiang District is the geographical, economic, trade, cultural, and political center of Chengdu, Sichuan, and Southwestern China. It is the seat of the Sichuan Provincial People's Congress and the Sichuan Provincial Government.

Jianjiang is bordered by Longquanyi District to the east, Shuangliu District to the south, Wuhou District to the west, Qingyang District to the northwest, and Chenghua District to the north.

== Administrative divisions ==
Jinjiang District administers 11 subdistricts:

- Jinguanyi Subdistrict (锦官驿街道)
- Donghu Subdistrict (东湖街道)
- Jinhualu Subdistrict (锦华路街道)
- Chunxilu Subdistrict (春熙路街道)
- Shuyuanjie Subdistrict (书院街街道)
- Niushikou Subdistrict (牛市口街道)
- Shahe Subdistrict (沙河街道)
- Shizishan Subdistrict (狮子山街道)
- Chenglonglu Subdistrict (成龙路街道)
- Liujiang Subdistrict (柳江街道)
- Sansheng Subdistrict (三圣街道)

== Economy ==
Jinjiang District is the economic center of the City of Chengdu. It has the most popular commercial areas of the city, including the Chunxi Road business zone, Sino-Ocean Taikoo Li Chengdu, and Chengdu International Finance Square.

Ancient Huayang County (now Jinjiang District) has a long commercial history. In the Tang Dynasty, it was known as "all kinds of industries gathered and shops flourished". Jinjiang District includes Chunxi Road-Yanshikou Business Circle, Hongxing Road-Dasi Temple Business Circle, Ranfang Street Small Commodity Distribution Center, Chengdu Ocean Taikoo Li, Chengdu People's Shopping Mall, Chengdu Hongqi Shopping Mall, Chengdu First and Second Department Stores, and Chengdu Department Store, Sichuan International Shopping Mall and other commercial areas, with Chengdu International Financial Center, Jinjiang Hotel, Sichuan Hotel, Minshan Hotel, etc., and is named as a "Business and Trade Bustling District" by the State Council.

In 2017, Jinjiang District achieved a regional GDP of 93.184 billion yuan, an increase of 8.0%. Among them, the added value of the primary industry was 65 million yuan, a year-on-year increase of 0.5%; the added value of the secondary industry was 10.352 billion yuan, a year-on-year increase of 4.0%; the added value of the tertiary industry was 82.767 billion yuan, a year-on-year increase of 8.5%. The proportions of the added value of the primary, secondary and tertiary industries were 0.1:11.1:88.8 respectively. The per capita GDP was 26,378 yuan, a net increase of 3,711 yuan over the same period last year. The growth rate of industrial added value above designated size reached 11.5%. Fixed asset investment was 46.587 billion yuan, a year-on-year increase of 8.4%. The total retail sales of consumer goods reached 95.629 billion yuan, a year-on-year increase of 10.9%. The total import and export volume reaches 5.5 billion yuan, and there are 131 Fortune 500 companies, accounting for 46% of Chengdu.
