= Keepers of the Waters =

Keepers of the Waters is a nonprofit organisation that focuses on water activism. It was founded by Betsy Damon, an artist and environmental activist, in 1991 with the assistance of the Hubert Humphrey Institute. The organization encourages "art, science, and community projects for the understanding and remediation of living water systems." As part of this initiative, Damon, assisted by Chengdu-based artist Dai Guanyu, organized two large-scale public events in Chengdu in China and Lhasa in Tibet in 1995 and 1996, respectively, where they invited local and international artists, such as Song Dong, Yin Xiuzhen, Dai Guanyu, and Zhang Shengquan to create new works that respond to the major rivers in these cities. These events featured works that are collaborative, participatory, community-driven, and engaging with the land. They therefore provide a different perspective to the art historical canon about performance art in China in the 1990s, which had mainly focused on individual performances by male artists who created performances indoors.

== Public events in China ==
Two events were organised in China where different artists participated:

The first event was organized between 29 July and 14 August in 1995 around Funan River in Chengdu.

List of participating artists:

- Ang Sang (Chinese: 昂桑)
- Beth Grossman
- Cai Jian (Chinese: 蔡健)
- Christine Baeumler
- Dai Guangyu (Chinese: 戴光郁)
- Ge Ci (Chinese: 格次)
- He Qichao (Chinese: 何啟超)
- Kristin Caskey
- Liu Chengying (Chinese: 劉成英)
- Suri Lamnu (Chinese: 次仁拉姆)
- Tang Liping (Chinese: 唐利平)
- Wang Peng (Chinese: 王蓬)
- Xu Hongbin (Chinese: 徐洪彬)
- Yang Lijun (Chinese: 楊麗君)
- Yang Qi (Chinese: 楊奇)
- Yin Xiaofeng (Chinese: 尹曉峰)
- Yin Xiuzhen (Chinese: 尹秀珍)
- Yu Leiqing (Chinese: 俞雷慶)
- Zeng Xun (Chinese: 曾循)
- Zhong Bo (Chinese: 鍾波)
- Zhou Zheng (Chinese: 周正)

The second event was organized between 18 August and 3 September in 1996 around Lhasa River in Tibet.

List of participating artists:

- Ang Sang (Chinese: 昂桑)
- Ang Xin
- DAI Guangyu (Chinese: 戴光郁)
- LI Jixiang (Chinese: 李繼祥)
- LIU Chengying (Chinese: 劉成英)
- RUAN Haiying (Chinese: 阮海鷹)
- SONG Dong (Chinese: 宋冬)
- Suri Lamnu (Chinese: 次仁拉姆)
- Suvan GEER
- YANG Kayva
- YIN Xiuzhen (Chinese: 尹秀珍)
- ZHANG Lei (Chinese: 張蕾)
- ZHANG Shengquan (Chinese: 張盛泉)
- ZHANG Xin (Chinese: 張新)

== More links ==
- Website
- The Lhasa event
