= Betsy Damon =

American artist (born 1940)

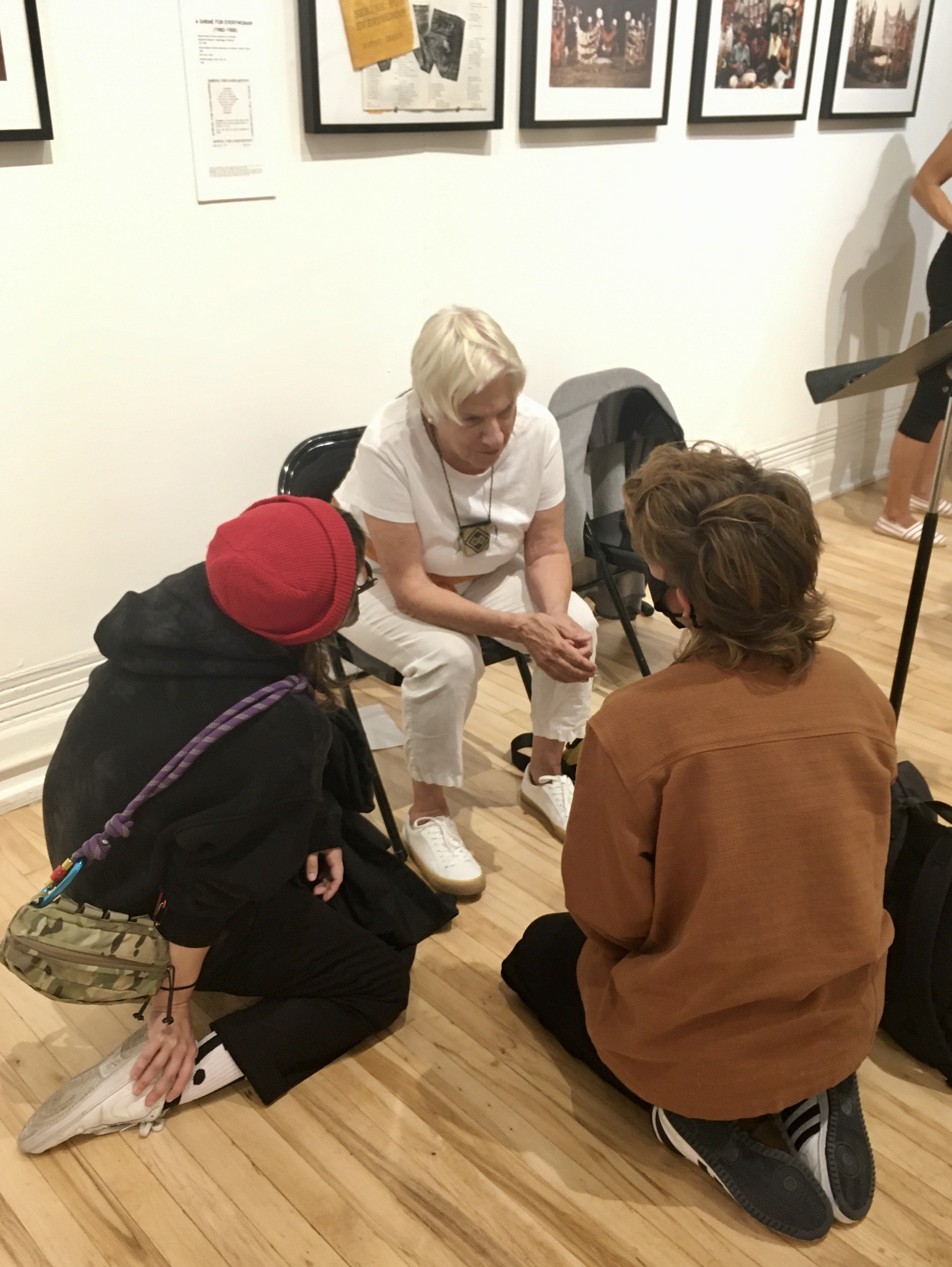
- Betsy Damon speaking with visitors at a gallery in Manhattan
- Born: 1940 (age 85–86)
- Education: Skidmore College; Columbia University
- Known for: Sculpture, Performance, Installation, Eco-Art, Ecofeminism
- Notable work: 7000 Year Old Woman, Memory of Clean Water, Keepers of the Waters: Chengdu & Lhasa, Living Water Garden
- Movement: Ecofeminism
- Spouse: Christian Otto
- Website: betsydamon.com

Betsy Damon (born 1940) is an American ecofeminist artist whose work has been influenced by her activism in women's, gay, and environmental rights.

== Early life and family ==
Damon was born in 1940 to American diplomat George Huntington Damon and Harriet Atkins.

Edwin F. Atkins was Damon's great grandfather (Boston merchant Elisha Atkins initially traded in Cuban molasses and sugar. In 1883–1884, his son Edwin F. Atkins took ownership of the Soledad plantation near Cienfuegos to settle an outstanding debt from a local trading, which contained the largest botanical research garden in Cuba. Damon is an aunt to Arwa Damon, Syrian American, former journalist, founder of inara humanitarian organization providing medical treatment to refugee children, as well as a great-granddaughter of investment banker Henry Hornblower, founder of Hornblower & Weeks. She spent her formative childhood years living in Istanbul.

== Career ==
Damon earned her Master of Fine Arts degree from Columbia University in 1966. After living in Germany, she returned to the United States in 1968, where artist Joyce Kozloff introduced her to the Women's Movement. In 1972, Damon attended the opening of Womanhouse, a landmark event in the evolution of her art. Following this, she organized a three-week women's arts conference and established the first feminist art studio at Cornell University.

Damon subsequently began creating street art performances in New York City. Her 1977 ritual performance, The 7000 Year Old Woman, addressed feminist themes of erasure, violence, oppression, and healing while bringing a female presence directly into public spaces.

A founding member of the Women's Caucus for Art, Damon received the organization's Mid-Life Career Award in 1989. Her performance work involving stones and dry riverbeds led her to cast a 250-foot dry riverbed in Castle Valley, Utah, which was subsequently featured in several exhibitions.

Around age 50, Damon shifted her artistic focus entirely to water conservation, environmental protection, and societal ecology. Her activist art influenced community initiatives such as the annual San Antonio River cleanup and raised international awareness of water systems.

In China, she designed her best-known project, The Living Water Garden (completed in 1998) in Chengdu, Sichuan Province the first urban ecological park themed around biological water remediation.

Damon won the Arts and Healing Network Award in 2000. She was named a Women's History Month Honoree by the National Women's History Project in 2009 and was awarded a Guggenheim Fellowship in 2023.

== Non-profit and NGO connections ==
One of Damon's goals was to eliminate sexism through grassroot movements. From 1980 to 2000 Damon founded and directed No Limits for Women Artists, an international organization that sought to improve female leadership and help men in becoming independent allies. No Limits for Women Artists worked to foster strong connections among its members, requiring members to participate in daily phone calls with each other. These calls gave women the opportunity to talk about their art, goals, motivation, and productivity.

In 1991 Damon founded Keepers of the Waters, a nonprofit organization that serves as an international community to encourage "art, science and community projects for the understanding and remediation of living water systems." The nonprofit is run with a collaborative approach and was started with the support of the Hubert Humphrey Institute.

In 2006, Damon, alongside a group of artists, scientists, and funders, met in Vancouver and created a summary report for UNESCO titled "Art in Ecology – A Think Tank on Arts and Sustainability." UNESCO had commissioned a report in advance of this meeting titled "Mapping the Terrain of Contemporary EcoART Practice", of which the meeting and summary report were a result.

== Performance art/installation art ==
In the 1970s, Damon began to work as a performance artist. Her work explored the connection between women and nature, often through covering herself with natural materials such as feathers and bark.

=== Performances ===
==== 7000 Year Old Woman, 1977 ====
In 1977, she created a piece called 7000 Year Old Woman and performed it in New York City twice. Her first performance took place on March 21, 1977, at the Cayman Gallery. Her second performance took place on May 21, 1977, on Prince Street near West Broadway. Damon commented that the figure that 7000 Year Old Woman embodies "is my sister, mother, my grandmothers, my great grandmothers, friends and lovers. She is my woman line of 7,000 years. She is me, the me that I know very little about."

The Cayman Gallery performance took place in the presence of other women. Damon painted her body, hair and face in white and hung small bags filled with colored flour on her body. A woman drew a spiral path for her to follow. Damon walked the spiral, cutting the bags on her body with a pair of scissors. The performance concluded with her surrounded by the empty bags; audience members were allowed to take them. In Heresies Vol. 3, (a Lesbian Art and Artists publication), Damon writes "I came out of the piece with a knowledge about the burden of time. A woman sixty years old is maybe twenty times more burdened than the thirty year old by her story. If we had had 7000 years of celebrated female energy, this would be different."

Damon performed the piece for the general public on Prince Street, with the assistance of artist Su Friedrich. Friedrich adorned Damon's body with 400 bags of colored flour and confined herself to within a sand circle. The audience was unpredictable. Friends brought flowers while boys threw eggs at her. Damon walked the circle cutting the bags from her body and handing them to the audience. As more bags were given away her sense of vulnerability rose. In the Heresies Vol. 3, she states she finishes the piece by returning to the center of the circle.

Damon comments that after that performance "I never knew until that afternoon how completely all things female had been eradicated from our streets. So totally is this true we do not even notice that she is missing."

==== Blind Beggar Woman and the Virgin Mary, 1979 ====
In a 1979 piece called Blind Beggarwoman and the Virgin Mary, Damon, as the central performer, dressed in rags and bags of dust, with gauze taped over her eyes. Crouching over a begging bowl filled with more pouches, she asked the spectators to whisper stories from their lives to her. The goal of the piece was to create a space where women's stories could be told. Damon discussed the piece in an interview: "In that performance, I asked the question: who are the female Homers, the female storytellers, who were the containers of history and memory? On the street, I begged for stories from people's lives, while my eyes were covered with these very obvious patches. I practiced with a friend of mine who was blind. People started saying that I was the multi-breasted female goddess and stuff like that, but that was not the origin of this piece. May Stevens got it right—she was the first to recognize that the work was also a mutilation image." The other performers either crouched low or sat on the floor, repeating "gestures [...] suggestive of women's endurance and of the cyclic nature of women's work."

==== Rape Memory, 1980 ====
Damon performed Rape Memory as part of the 1980 Great American Lesbian Art Show in Los Angeles. Against a chorus of voices trying to silence her, she attempted to share her own traumatic rape experience. After an hour, she was allowed to describe an assault she experienced when she was two and a half years old. Audience members were allowed to shared their own experiences after her performance. Damon sought to heal through community and encouraged women to speak out.

=== Installations ===
==== Shrine for Everywoman, 1980 ====
As part of the International Festival of Women Artists in 1980 in Copenhagen, Damon created an interactive installation piece. Damon invited women to write thoughts and stories down and took these thoughts and put them in small bags, hanging them in rows on cords like prayer flags. Women's thoughts formed a gathering space. A mandala, a Buddhist symbol of the universe marked the space as a place of community. The contents of the bags contained stories, hopes, fears, and visions. Damon created a space of recovery and spirituality.

==== A Memory of Clean Water, 1985 ====
In 1985, Damon collaborated with artist Robyn Stein to lead a team of papermakers in the casting of a 250-foot section of dry riverbed in Castle Creek, Utah. Papermakers included Helmut Becker, Coco Gordon, Ray Tomasso, and Lucy Wallingford. A Memory of Clean Water was commissioned by the Danforth Museum of Art and received funding from the Massachusetts Council on the Arts and Humanities. A 1987 film by Hopi filmmaker Victor Masayesva documents the casting of the piece. This piece marked the beginning of Damon's transition into water activism.

== Works in China ==
Damon first visited China in 1989 as a guest artist at a United Nations conference. On a subsequent visit, she traveled to the mountains north of Chengdu, where she was inspired by cultural attitudes about the sacredness of quality water.

Keepers of the Waters: Chengdu

In 1995, Damon lead a team of American, Chinese, and Tibetan artists to create a series of collaborative public performances and installations along the Fu and Nan Rivers in Chengdu, China. These experimental social engagements took place outdoors, and would not have been possible in the context of state-run museums. Avoiding explicit political commentary, these performances and temporary public art works dramatized the history and consequences of rapid industrialization along the river.

Keepers of the Waters: Lhasa

Damon organized a second Keepers of the Waters performance series in Lhasa, Tibet in 1996. Collaborating artists included Song Dong, Yin Xiuzhen, and around a dozen more artists.

The Living Water Garden, 1998

Damon's collaborative public performance works in China put her into contact with city government, with whom she collaborated to build a 6-acre park along the Funan River in Chengdu's Jin Jiang District. Other collaborators included American landscape architect Margie Ruddick and hydraulic engineer Huan Shi Da. The Living Water Garden was the first urban eco-environmental park in the world to take water as its theme. The park integrates water ecology, water treatment, and education. It includes a constructed wetlands that function as a biological water treatment system, a simulated natural forest community, and an environmental education center. After a variety of treatment processes, the river water flows back into the Fu River. The Living Water Garden filters around 50,000 gallons of water per day.

The Living Water Garden won awards including the Waterfront Center's "Excellence on the Waterfront Award" in 1998, the "Environmental Design Award" jointly evaluated by the International Association for Environmental Design, and the 1998 UN Habitat Award. It is one of the most-visited parks in Chengdu.

== Publications ==
=== Water Talks, 2022 ===
Damon's memoir Water Talks was published by SteinerBooks in 2022. Anthropologist Dr. Jane Goodall wrote the foreword. Water Talks recounts Damon's early performance career, her transition into water activism, her collaborative public performance work in Chengdu and Lhasa, the Living Water Garden in Chengdu, as well as subsequent public art projects in the United States.

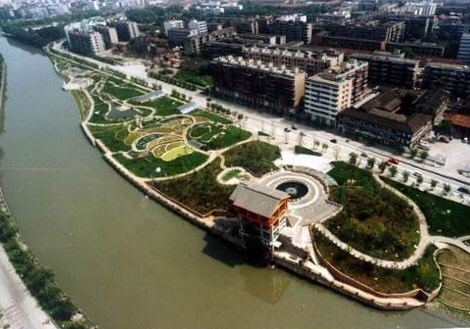
Aerial view of the Living Water Garden

== Exhibitions and major works ==
=== Performances ===
- 1985–90: The Shrine for Everywoman.
- 1983–1989: A Mediation with Stones for the Survival of the Planet.
- 1981–83: A Rape Memory.
- 1979–81: Blind Beggar Woman.
- 1977: 7,000 Year Old Woman, New York, N.Y.

=== Shows ===
- 2019: Keepers of the Waters: Lhasa & Chengdu, Taipei Biennial.
- 2012: Feminist, and..., Mattress Factory, Pittsburgh, PA.
- 1986–1991: A Memory of Clean Water, Everhart Museum.
- 1990: An Homage to Rivers, Aspen Art Museum Biennial.
- January 25 – March 22, 1987: Special Projects (Winter 1987), MoMA PS1.
- January 17 – March 14, 1982: The Wild Art Show, MoMA PS1.
- October 5 2021 Betsy Damon: Passages: Rites & Rituals, La MaMa Galleria NYC.
