= Waste Not =

Exhibit by Chinese artist Song Dong

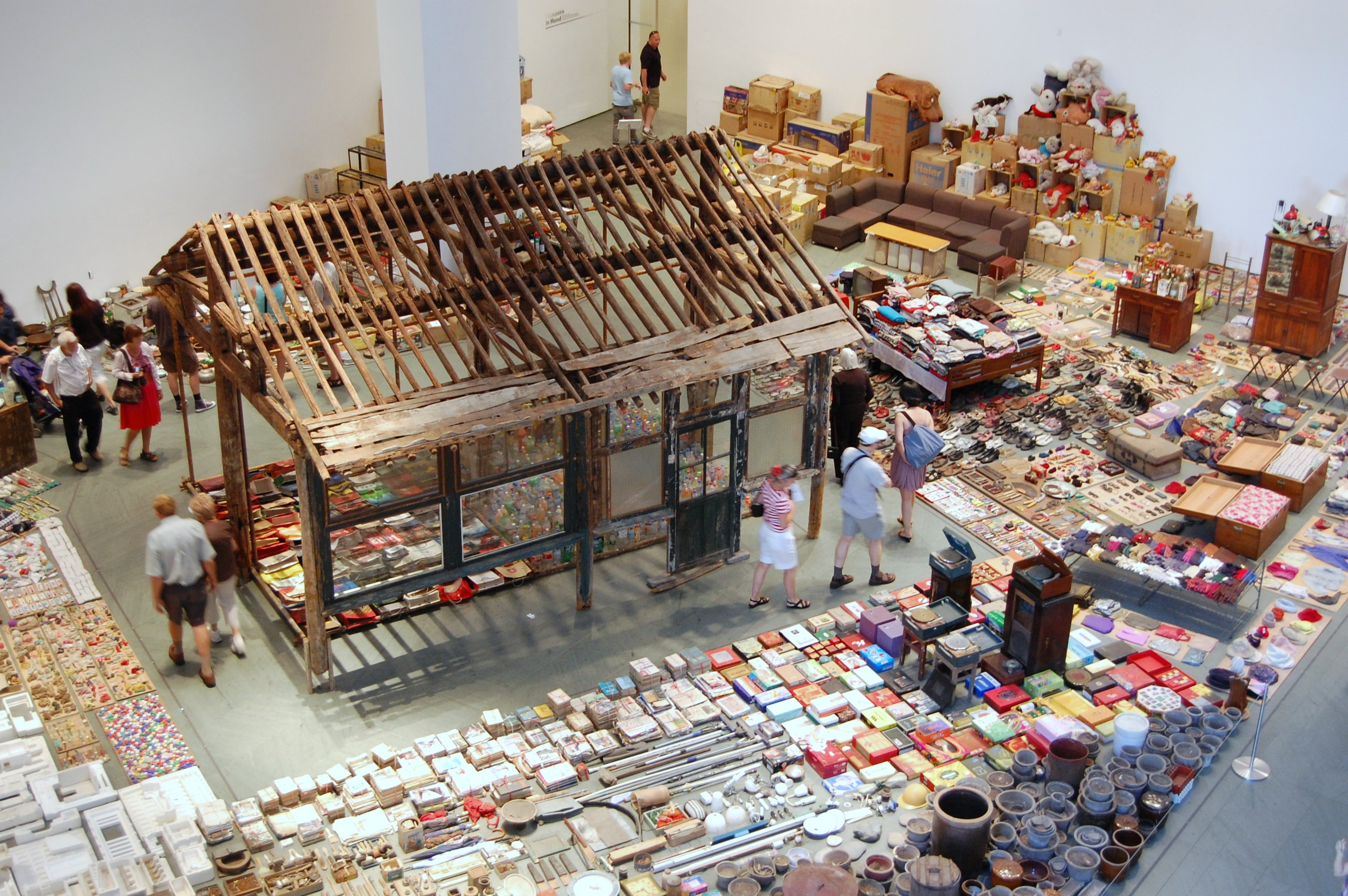
Waste Not at the Museum of Modern Art, New York, 2006

Waste Not (Chinese: 物尽其用; pinyin: Wù jìn qí yòng) is an exhibit by Chinese artist Song Dong that displays over 10,000 domestic objects formerly owned by his late mother, who refused to throw anything away if she could possibly reuse it. She had suffered poverty during China's turmoil in the 1950s and 1960s and had acquired a habit of thrift and re-use that led her to store domestic objects of all kinds in her tiny house in Beijing. After the death of her husband in 2002, her desire to hoard items became an obsession that began to affect her standard of living. Song and his sister managed to alleviate it by persuading her to let him use her possessions as an art installation, reflecting her life and the modern history of China as experienced by one family. First exhibited in Beijing in 2005, Waste Not has since travelled around the world to major galleries in Canada, the United Kingdom and the United States, where it has been well received by critics.

== Background ==
Song Dong is a Chinese artist who is often described as a practitioner of conceptual art, focusing on ideas as much as physical materials. He was born in 1966 during the Cultural Revolution and lived through the turmoil that accompanied the development of modern China. He worked as a painter until the 1989 Tiananmen Square protests and massacre, following which he switched to performance, video and photography after a hiatus of several years.

Born in 1938, Song Dong's mother Zhao Xiangyuan was a member of a prosperous family that fell on hard times after Mao Zedong established the People's Republic of China in 1949. His maternal grandfather was an officer in the Kuomintang (KMT), the nationalist party that ruled much of China from 1928 until its retreat to Taiwan in 1949 after being defeated by the Chinese Communist Party during the Chinese Civil War. He served with the KMT in the Second Sino-Japanese War. In 1950, his grandparents and his mother moved to Beijing but in 1953 his grandfather was arrested and imprisoned for several years on charges of being a spy for the KMT. His grandmother died of cancer in 1961, having brought up the family in his grandfather's absence. The repeated natural and man-made disasters suffered by China in the 1950s and 1960s, such as the Great Leap Forward and the Cultural Revolution, resulted in the deaths of millions of Chinese people and drove Song Dong's family into poverty. His father, Song Shiping, was sent to a re-education camp for several years during the Cultural Revolution and did not return to Zhao or the younger Song until 1978.

Like many other Chinese at the time, Zhao adopted the habits of frugality and thrift in order to make the best of what little she had. Song recalls that when he was a child, "my mother always brought scraps of fabric to make clothes, because they didn't need to be purchased with the government-distributed clothing coupons." She continued to collect them even in better times because she feared that the shortages might some day return, seeing the habit of "waste not" as a fabao – literally a "magic weapon" to guard against a return to poverty.

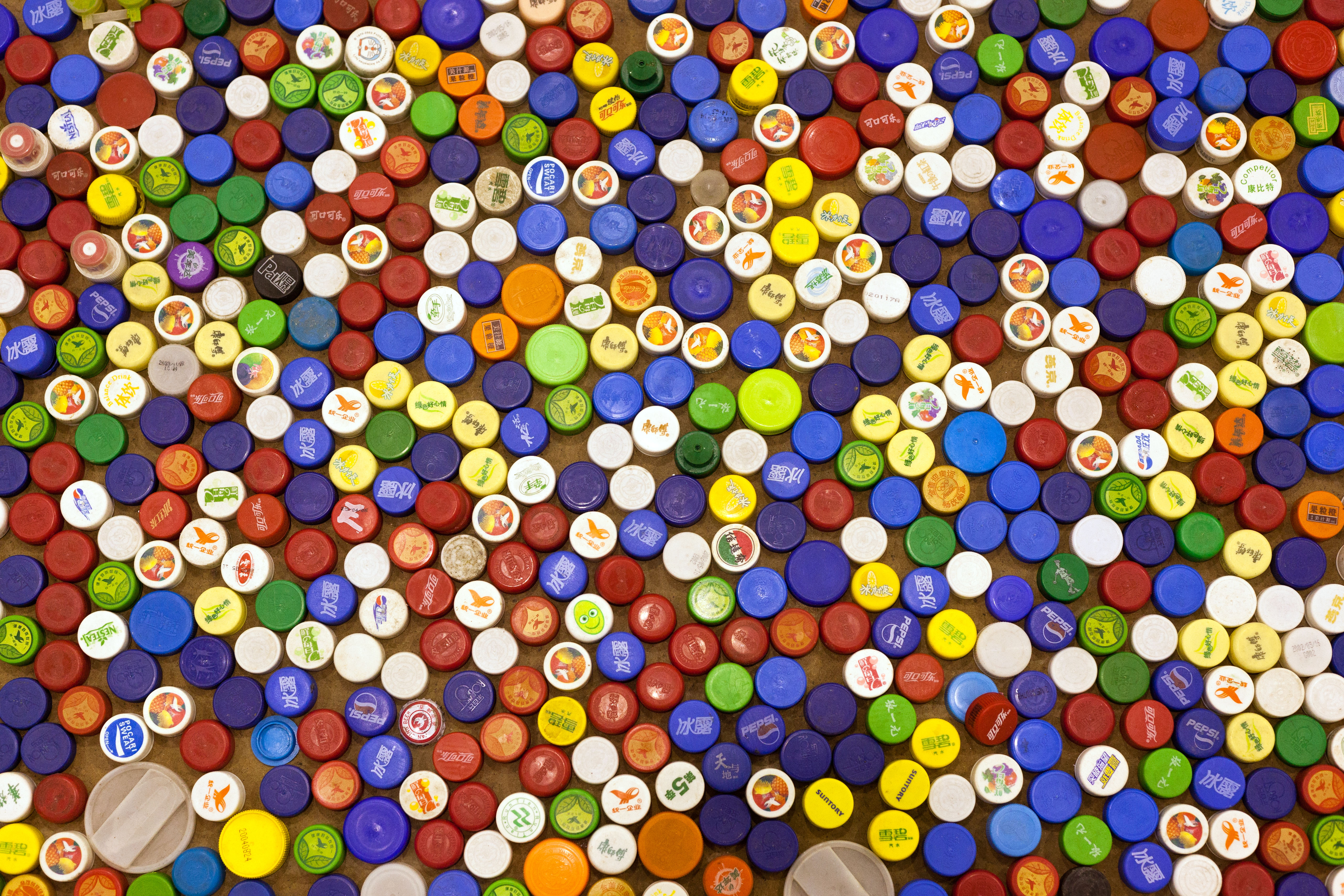
Bottle caps saved by Zhao Xiangyuan over the years

When Song's father died suddenly in 2002 his mother suffered an emotional breakdown and her habit of holding on to things was taken to extremes, with every possible space of her tiny house crammed with thousands of domestic odds and ends. Song Dong and his sister Song Hui attempted to tidy up for her but this led to conflict, as Zhao opposed their efforts to dispose of things that she saw as potentially useful. Song eventually came to understand that, as he puts it,

my mother's need to fill space with daily-life objects resulted from a need to fill the emptiness after my father's death. I recognised that in this era of transition, a person could live through several different lives in just one lifetime. In the wink of an eye, one's life could undergo great changes causing deep divisions between old and young.

He found a way to improve the quality of Zhao's life and still respect her wishes by using the principle of "waste not" and making art out of his mother's possessions. In 2005 he created an exhibit of the objects that she had collected, to her delight; she told him, "Keeping those things was useful, wasn't it!" In putting her things on public display, "it gave my mother a space to put her memories and history in order," where she was acting as the artist and Song was just her assistant. Song and his mother created a neon sign for the exhibit in 2005 as a message, facing the stars, to his father: "Dad, don't worry, mum and all the family are well". Zhao herself died in 2008 after she tried to rescue a wounded bird from a tree but fell from a step-ladder during the attempt.

== Exhibit and reviews ==
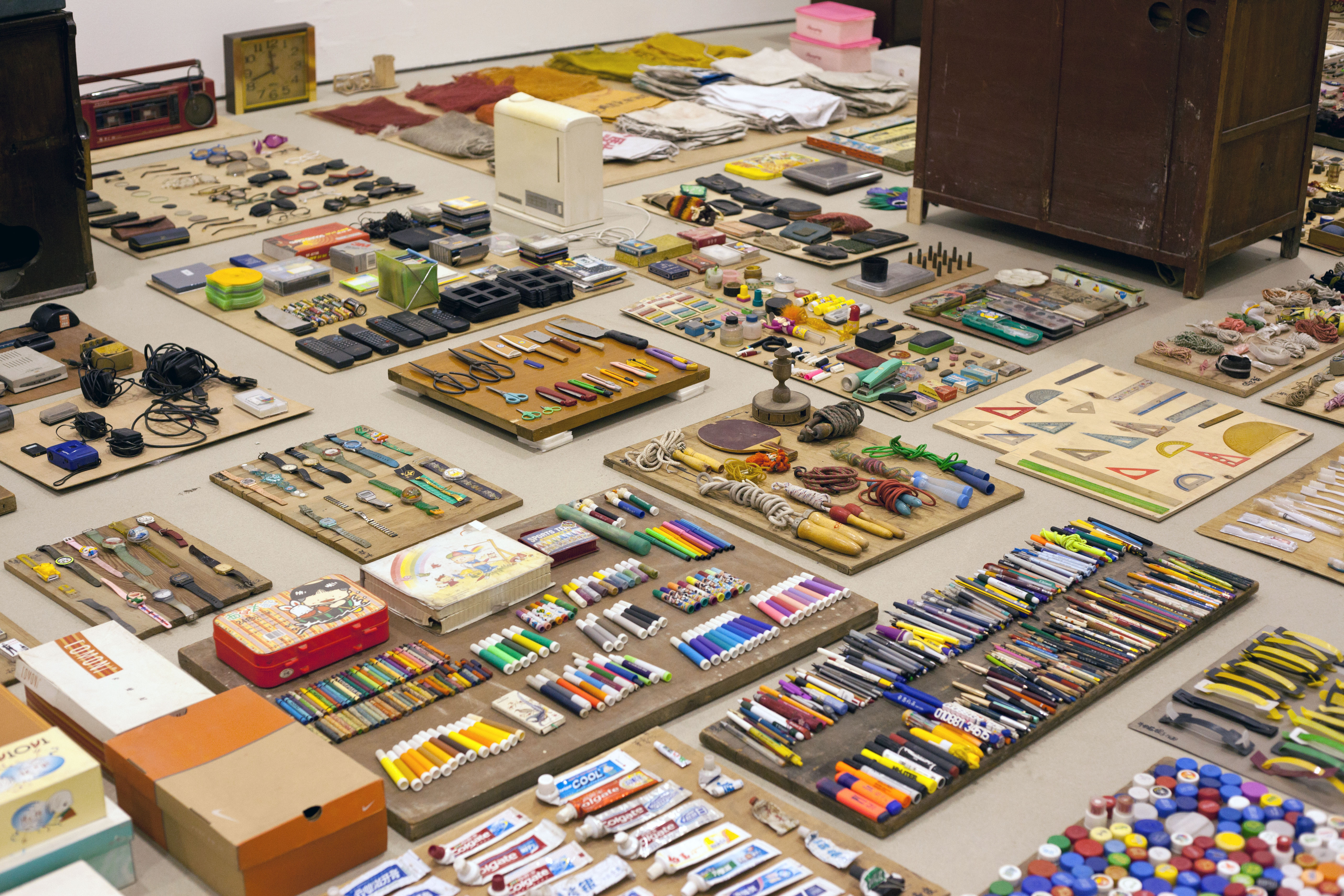
Various domestic items including pens, wristwatches, empty toothpaste tubes and TV remote controls laid out on display as part of Waste Not

Waste Not was first displayed in Beijing at the Beijing Tokyo Art Projects in 2005, where it was documented by the art historian Wu Hung. As of 2012, it has been shown at eight museums and galleries including the Museum of Modern Art, New York; the Barbican Centre, London; and the Vancouver Art Gallery, Vancouver; in 2015 in Kunsthalle Düsseldorf. The exhibit consists of thousands of domestic objects such as toothpaste tubes, bowls, toys, bottle tops, crockery, cutlery, food containers and ballpoint pens, arranged in neat rows or piles. They are ordered purely by use and type rather than by colour, shape of texture, and are identically spaced from their neighbours; they have no inherent aesthetic value. The exhibit is curated by Song Dong, his wife and fellow artist Yin Xiuzhen and his sister Song Hui. It takes its name from the Chinese adage wù jìn qí yòng (物尽其用), translated roughly as "waste not, want not" but more literally as "anything that can be somehow of use, should be used as much as possible". In 2011, Waste Not formed part of a larger exhibition titled Song Dong: Dad and Mom, Don't Worry About Us, We Are All Well at the Yerba Buena Center for the Arts in San Francisco in which Song combined the display of his mother's possessions with other photo-based works focusing on his family.

Song comments that the collection of bits of old soap gathered in a washing bowl are his favourite items in the exhibit: "They look like stones now but to me they're very special. Some of the bits are probably older than I am. My mother gave them to me as a gift on my wedding day but I said: 'Oh I wash my clothes in a washing machine now I don't need soap'. But when I started the project I realised she'd kept the soap pieces anyway. So it wasn't just soap, it was my mother's love." He feels that his mother "lives in this work because each time we do Waste Not I have to discuss it with my sister and my family - and my mother becomes part of the discussion."

Waste Not has been positively reviewed by many critics. Writing in The New York Times, Holland Cotter felt that it sent "mixed signals": "On the one hand, it is fascinating to be wandering, right here in New York, through a time capsule of a lost era of Chinese culture. On the other, it is disturbing to imagine anyone growing up, as Mr. Song did, in so smothering a physical environment. Finally, it is deeply moving to see the span of one person’s life — his mother’s — summed up, monument style, in a work of art that is every bit as much about loss as it is about muchness.

The BBC's Vincent Dowd commented that "most of us could walk around Waste Not and find echoes of our own lives. It's the most personal of exhibitions and yet the most universal." Jenny Gilbert of The Independent saw it as "a densely detailed portrait of a family's life together", seeing it as "a bid to fill an emotional void left by children grown and gone, a partner deceased." She noted that the "faded and ferociously ironed-flat baby clothes are freighted with longing – perhaps not only for times past, however hard and meagre, but for an imagined future: phantom grandchildren, the cycle beginning again."

Michelle Price of the Architects' Journal drew a somewhat different lesson, feeling that it highlighted "the level of consumerism and waste in the world" and commenting that it "questions the throw-away culture we live in and promotes a more thrifty lifestyle that would contribute to lowering CO_{2} emissions worldwide." Ben Luke of the London Evening Standard newspaper likewise saw it as "a stark reflection of a single human life on the environment", noting that while Zhao's collection of domestic objects "adds up to a modest existence but, even still, multiply her footprint by the billions of other people on the earth, many of them far more wasteful, and the work becomes as much a warning as it is a poignant family portrait."

The reviewer for Vancouver's Here and Elsewhere magazine found Waste Not "visually astonishing", as it presents a sight that many people would normally never see: "Since most people would throw away the great majority of the items the artist’s mother carefully collated, seeing them amassed in this fashion is a visceral shock." Time Out's Martin Coomer similarly found it "infinitely photogenic, endlessly distracting" and saw similarities to the arrangements of other artists, notably Sarah Sze and Tomoko Takahashi.

The exhibit has been particularly well received by Chinese people who lived through the Cultural Revolution and had similar experiences. According to Song, while it was being displayed in Beijing, "many people came who had a similar life during the cultural revolution and talked to my mother for half a day at a time. They told her: 'It's not your home, it's my home.' It got my mother out of her sadness – she said she had a second life."

== See also ==
- Museum of Brands
