= Anshun Bridge =

Bridge in Chengdu, Sichuan, China

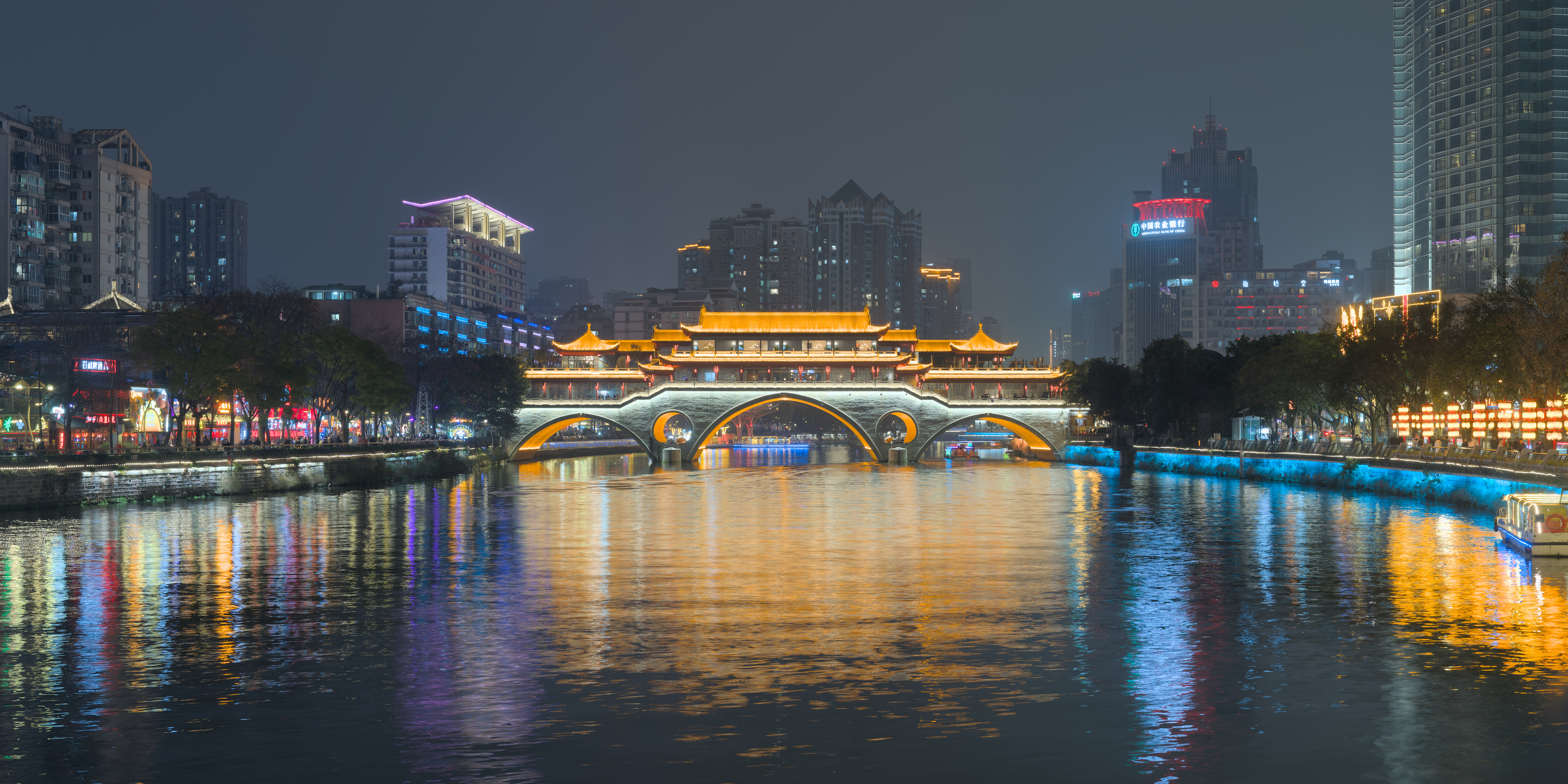
- View of the Anshun Bridge in 2026
- Coordinates: 30°38′39″N 104°05′00″E
- Carries: Pedestrians only
- Crosses: Jin River
- Locale: Chengdu, Sichuan Province, China
- Official name: 安顺廊桥
- Website: thebridge.com.cn/en/

Characteristics
- Design: Arch bridge

Location
- Interactive map of Anshun Bridge

The Anshun Bridge (Chinese: 安顺桥; lit. 'Bridge of the Peaceful and Fluent') is a bridge in Chengdu, Sichuan, China. It crosses the Jin River. The covered bridge contains a relatively large restaurant and is a popular eating location in the city.

== History ==
In the 13th century, Marco Polo wrote about several bridges in China, and the Anshun Bridge (an earlier version of it) was one of them.

Anshun Bridge, also named Changhong Bridge (长虹桥) at that time, was renovated in 1677. It connected Da'an Street to Wannianqiao Street, spanning the Jinjiang River with a two-level wooden structure: the upper level housed deity statues, while the lower level provided a pathway for pedestrians and goods transporters. The bridge was reconstructed multiple times after being destroyed by floods, including major rebuilds in 1744 and 1746.

In 1949, after the Communist takeover of Chengdu, the newly established Chengdu Municipal People's Government rebuilt the bridge at the eastern end of Taiping Upper Street as a simpler one-level wooden structure for pedestrian use. Another reconstruction in 1974 resulted in a new bridge completed in 1978, but it collapsed during a flood in 1981. To meet the city's growing transportation needs, the Chengdu municipal government built a vehicle-accessible "New Anshun Bridge" in 1978 at Shierbei Street.

As part of the Fu'nan River restoration project in 1996, the Chengdu Municipal People's Government dismantled the damaged old bridge and commissioned a redesign to create a three-arch replica incorporating historical and commercial features. This project led to the renaming of the old structure as "Anshun Langqiao" (安顺廊桥), combining bridge and building elements with cultural and tourism functions. Construction began in 2000 and was completed in August 2003, as part of the municipal government's initiative to preserving the city's heritage while adapting to modern urban needs.

== Gallery ==
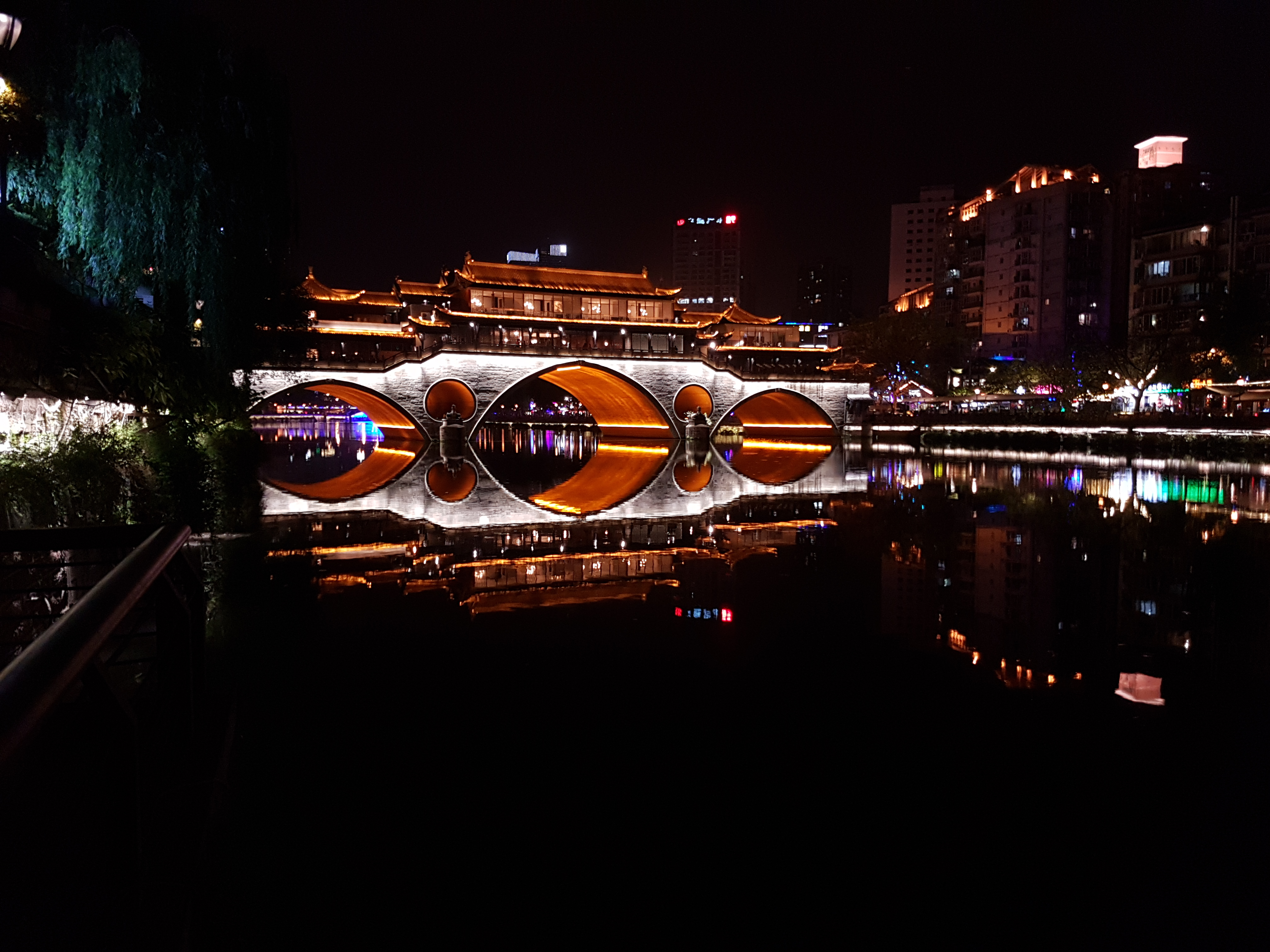
Anshun Bridge at night

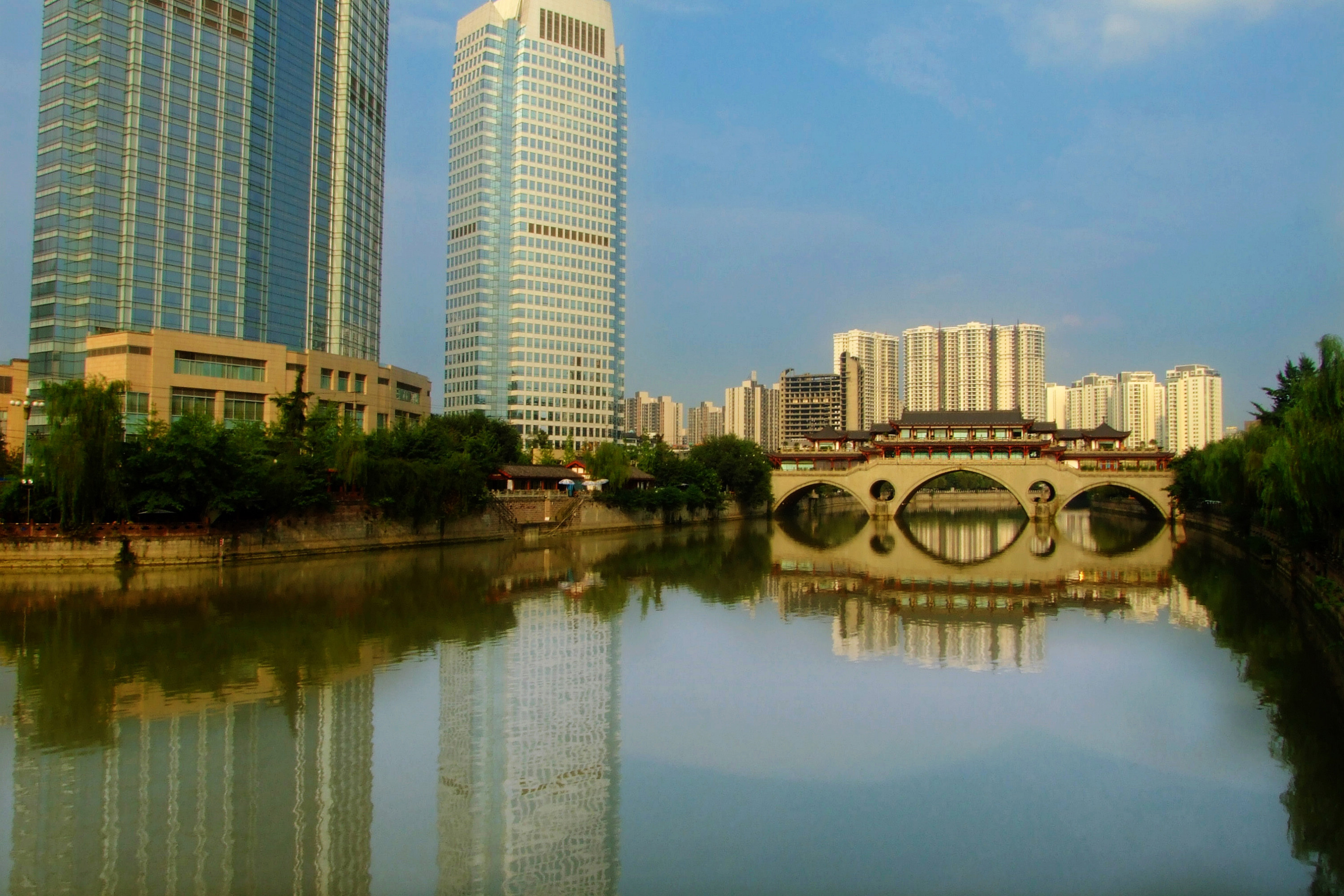
The Anshun Bridge crosses the Jin River in Chengdu

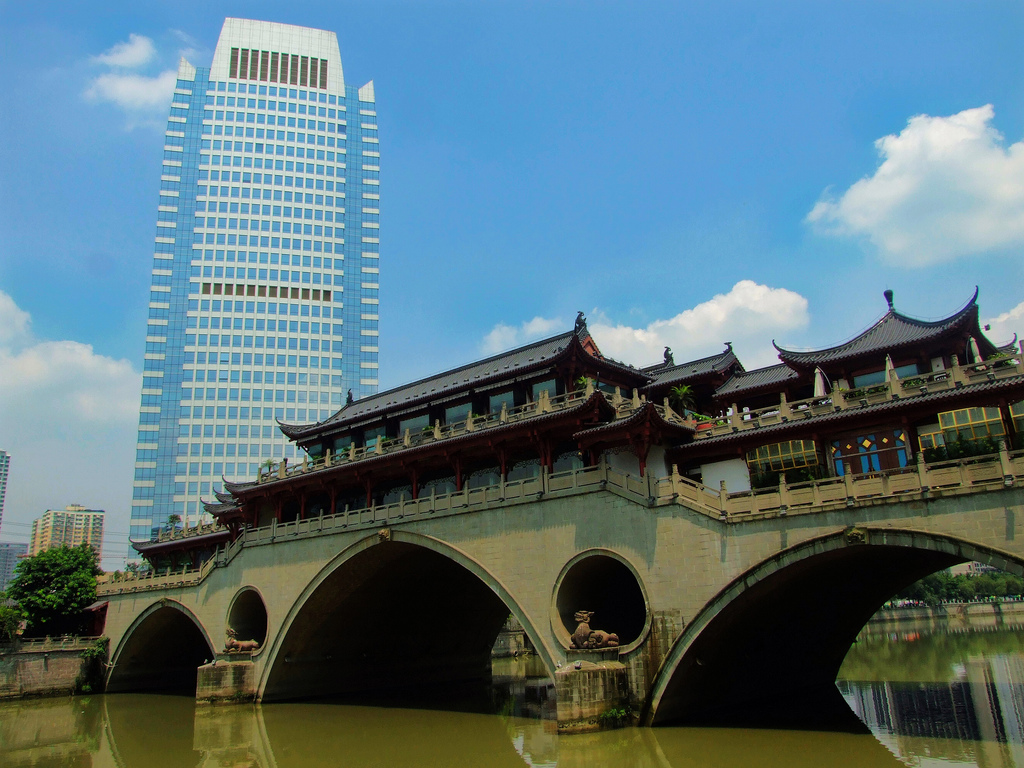
Bridge detail

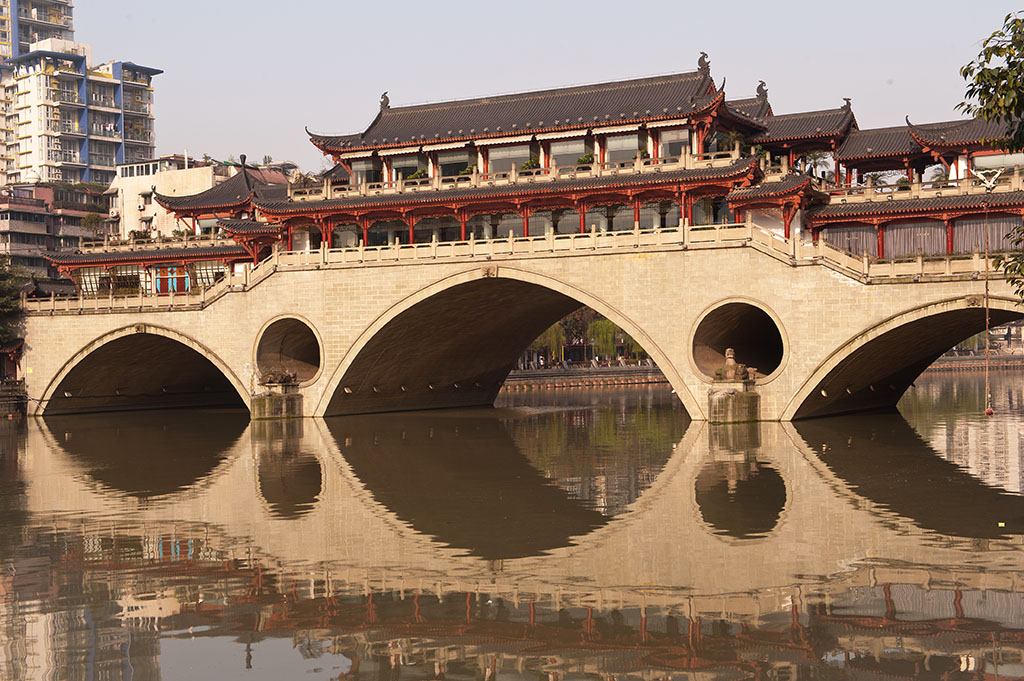
The bridge in 2012
