= Jin River (Sichuan) =

River in Sichuan, China

Coordinates: 30°13′28″N 103°54′28″E

Jin River (Jin Jiang River)
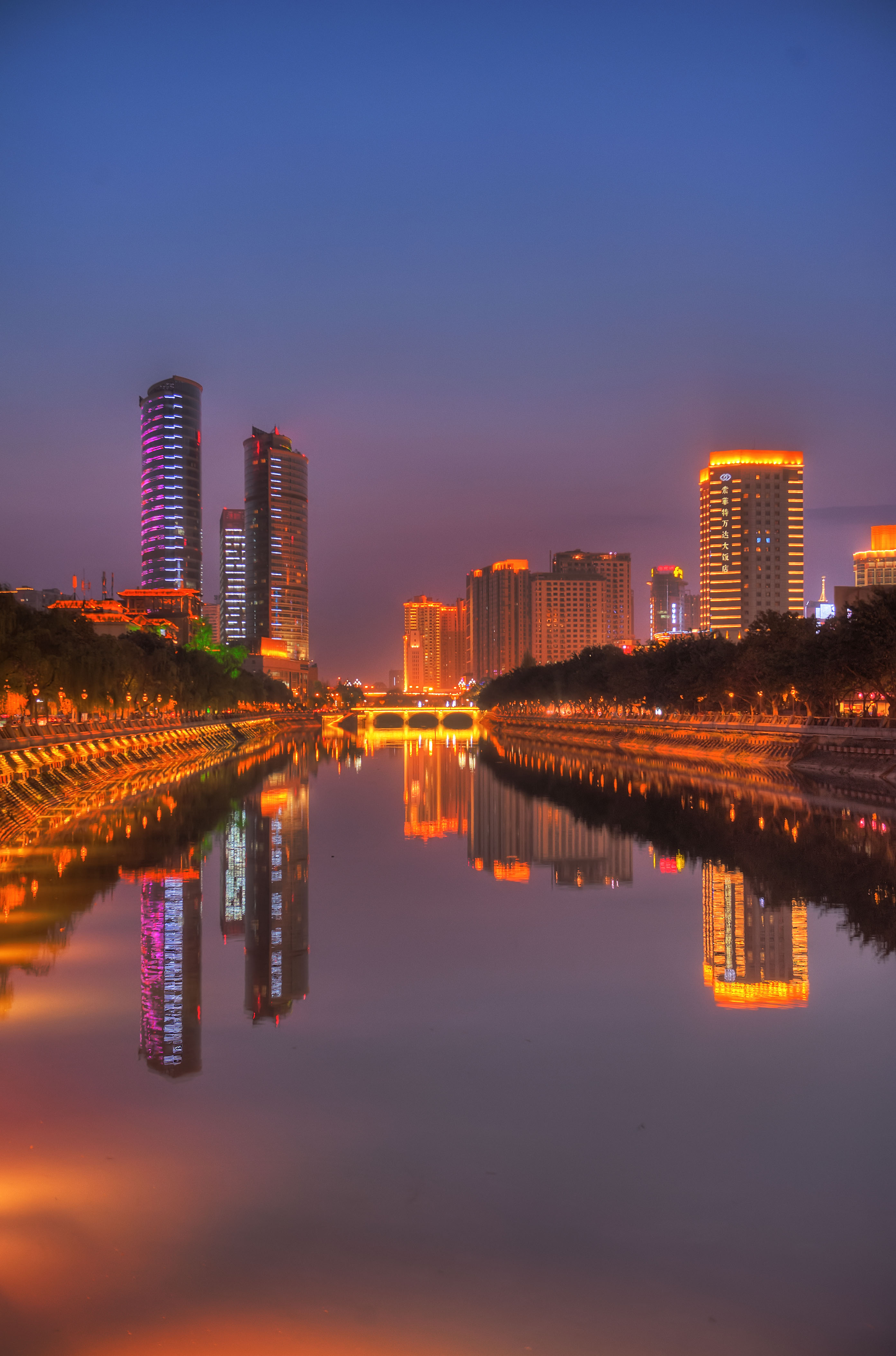
- Jin River in Chengdu

Location
- Country: China

Physical characteristics
- Source
  - location: Dujiangyan
- Mouth
  - location: Pengshan
- Length: 97.3 km (60.5 mi)
- Basin size: 2,090 km^{2} (810 sq mi)

Basin features
- River system: Yangtze River System
- Cities: Chengdu
- Bridges: Anshun Bridge

The Jin River (Chinese: 锦江; pinyin: Jǐn Jiāng) is a river of Sichuan, China. It flows through the provincial capital of Chengdu. It consists of three parts: the Fu River, an extension of the Fu River (Chinese: 府河) and the Nan River(Chinese: 南河). The Jin River has a long and complex cultural history, dating back to 256 BC when it was formed. Over the course of several dynasties, the Jin River has been given different names by the ruler in power at the time. Flowing the provincial capital of Chengdu city, the river historically provided a source for irrigation, boat travel, and a means to dispose of wastewater. As the cities’ population increased, pollution of the river became a major environmental concern leading to regulation projects beginning in 1993. The current ecological state of the river is degraded as it is overloaded with dissolved nitrogen and phosphorus inputs from urban sources. Alongside the riverbank of the Jin River, theme parks were built and numerous tourism programs were created.

== Geography ==
=== Course and tributaries ===
Jin River is located in the western region of Sichuan Basin and the eastern region of Qinghai Tibet Plateau. The Fu River and the Nan River, the two components of the Jin River, encircle the ancient city of Chengdu. The Fu River starts from XinQuan Road (Chinese: 新泉路) and ends in Hexin Village (Chinese: 河心村) inside Chengdu city. The extension of the Fu River starts from Hexin Village and flows until it joins the Min River (Chinese: 岷江) at Pengshan district (Chinese: 彭山区) in the city of Meishan (Chinese: 眉山), further south of Chengdu. The Fu River is 19.4 km long. The Nan River occupies a small segment of the Jin River and its length is only 5.63 km. The Nan River joins the Fu River at the confluence point called He Jiang Ting (Chinese: 合江亭) inside Chengdu city. From the confluence point to Hexin Village, the Baidu Map calls this reach the Fu River. Therefore, the Nan River is a tributary of the Fu River. The total length of the Jin River is 97.3 km. The total watershed area that Jin River flows across is 2090 km^{2}.

=== Origin of the Fu River ===
Chengdu is located within the Min River tributaries of the Yangtze River and Tuo Jiang Basin. Both the Fu River and the Nan River are fed by the Min River tributaries. The origins of the Fu River and the Nan River can be attributed to the history of the earliest dam project, called Dujiangyan, built by a local official, Li Bing, and his son in 256 BC. The project consisted of artificial canals, conduits, and dams that split the Min River into four inner irrigation rivers and one outer river. The four inner rivers flow in artificial conduits whereas the outer river, called the Jin Ma River (Chinese: 金马河), flows in a natural channel at the southernmost position. The four inner irrigation rivers, from north to south, are the Pu Yang River (Chinese: 蒲阳河), the Bai Tiao River (Chinese: 柏条河), the Zou Ma River (Chinese: 走马河), and the Jiang An River (Chinese: 江安河). The Zou Ma River (Chinese: 走马河) and Bai Tiao River (Chinese: 柏条河) flow for several dozens of kilometers and eventually join together at Xiang Cao Hu Wetland Park (Chinese: 香草湖湿地公园). Once it reaches the Chengdu's Shidiyan Dam (Chinese: 石堤堰), it diverges into two rivers, the Pihe River and the southward flowing Fu River.

=== Origin of the Nan River ===
The Zou Ma River flows from the northwest in a southeast direction. Not far after Dujiangyan, it spits into the Qingshui River (Chinese: 清水河) and the Zou Ma River. Further south than the Fu River, the Qingshui River eventually flows into Chengdu. After the Qingshui River enters Chengdu, it splits into the Mo Di River (Chinese: 摸底河) and the Qingshui River for a short distance until they merge and form the Nan River. The Nan River is therefore from the Qingshui River. Another inner river derived from Dujiangyan, called the Jiang An River (Chinese: 江安河), flows south of the Zou Ma River and the Qingshui River. The Jiang An River enters Chengdu further south than the Nan River. After that, it joins the Fu River near Nan Hu Wetland Park (Chinese: 南湖湿地公园). Even though the Baidu Map indicates that the river joining the Jiang An River is labelled as Fu River, one Chengdu history book mentions that this part is not considered as the Fu River. This part belongs to the extension that is considered as the Jin River and it flows further down south to join the Min River. If we count the length of the Jin River starting from the start point of the Fu River at the Shidiyan Dam until the confluence with the Min River, then the total length of Jin River is 116.9 km. The Jin Ma River, the only river that flows in a natural channel after Dujiangyan, runs for 70.6 km and eventually joins the Min River shortly after the Jin River ends.

== Naming ==
The Jin River, composed of the Fu River, the Nan River, and the river channel from Hexin Village of Chengdu to the Min River, have been renamed several times over the course of different dynasties. The Fu River was first known as the Pi River, Shiqiao River, or Qingyuan River when the city was called the Chengdu Mansion. After the Ming Dynasty (1368-1644), the Nan River was known as Wenjian, Dajian, Shengjiang River, Shengqiao Water, Qingjiang, Qingshui River, Fenshui, Fenjian, Guanjin River, and Jinshui.

History of the Jin River name across the dynasties of China
Dynasty (English / Chinese / Hanyu Pinyin)	Year (AD)	Fu River Name (English / Chinese / Hanyu Pinyin)	Nan River Name (English / Chinese / Hanyu Pinyin)
Tang Dynasty / 唐朝 / Tang	618-907	Nei River / 内江 / Nei Jiang	Wai River / 外江 / Wai Jiang
Pre-Shu Period / 前蜀时期 / Qian Shu	907-925	Jing River / 京江 / Jing Jiang (This Jing is the Chinese character 京 which is different from Jin as 锦)	
Song Dynasty / 宋朝 / Song	960-1279	Yongping River or Youzi River / 永平江 or 柚子江 / Yongping Jiang or Youzi Jiang	
Ming Dynasty / 明朝 / Ming	1368-1644	Wen River or Sheng River or Qing River / 汶江 or 笙江 or 清江 / Wen Jing or Sheng Jiang or Qing Jiang (Inspired by Xu Xiake, a geographer during this period)	

In history, the Fu and the Nan River components of the Jin River were understood unofficially by the people as the "Funan River" for short. This was deemed too informal and was rectified on May 10, 2005, by the Sichuan Provincial People's Government. They are now officially named as their distinct channels.

== Ecology ==
=== Urban ecology ===
The current Jin River has eutrophication issues caused by different types of urban wastewater such as sewage discharge, road surface runoff, and effluent. Eutrophication is caused by excessive amounts of total dissolved phosphorus (TDP) and total dissolved nitrogen (TDN) in both the Fu River and the Nan River. Urbanization and wastewater in the City of Chengdu raises the TDP concentration in the Fu River. Compared to the Fu River, the Nan River has less TDP due to less wastewater input. Even though the concentration of TDN is considered low in both the Fu River and the Nan River, it is higher than the type 3 international standard requirements for water quality.

Different types of algae exist in the waterbody of the Jin River. The growth rate of Chlorophyll a is limited by nitrogen but not by phosphorus according to the determined N:P ratio in the Jin River's water column. Even with high phosphorus inputs, there is no such phenomenon as algal or cyanobacteria blooms because of the small ratio between N and P. The low ratio of N:P found in the Jin River is consistent with other studies where the phytoplankton community was N-limited. It is also caused by low N:P ratio of the water in the area. The N-limiting condition in both the Fu River and the Nan River can pose a potential biological hazard. If any wastewater or effluent that contains a large amount of TDN enter the river, it is likely to trigger an algal bloom. Studies shows that the surface micro-layer, which is the topmost layer of the river that exists in between atmosphere and water body, has larger amounts of P and N than the subsurface layer of the Jin River water body. Sediment studies in the Jin River show that the accumulated N and P in benthic sediments far exceed the P and N concentration in both the surface micro-layer and the sub-surface layer.

== History ==
=== Commercial navigation ===
Historically, the Jin River was once a wide channel that had enough water volume to support boat travel in and out of Chengdu. Since the Jin River connects to the Min River, people used the waterway as a corridor for economic exchanges all the way to the middle and lower reaches of the Yangtze River. It has been estimated that during the early 1900s the Jin River once supported ships that could displace water volumes from 8 to 30 tons. During the Jin Dynasty (266-420 AD), General Wang Jun led a navy of 70 boats, each capable of carrying 1,000 people, down the river to attack the Eastern Wu. The Jin River was also used for non-commercial travel. Bamboo rafts were used to travel from Dujiangyan to Chengdu. This was the main route of travel until 1933, when the Chengdu-Chongqing Highway was constructed. Shortly after the 1950s, the Jin River's size and water levels rapidly declined to conditions that could no longer support the boating industry of ancient times. Siltation of the river also contributed to the change in watercourse. In 1952, the Chengdu-Chongqing Railway began operating, making transport over land the dominant mode.

=== Pollution ===
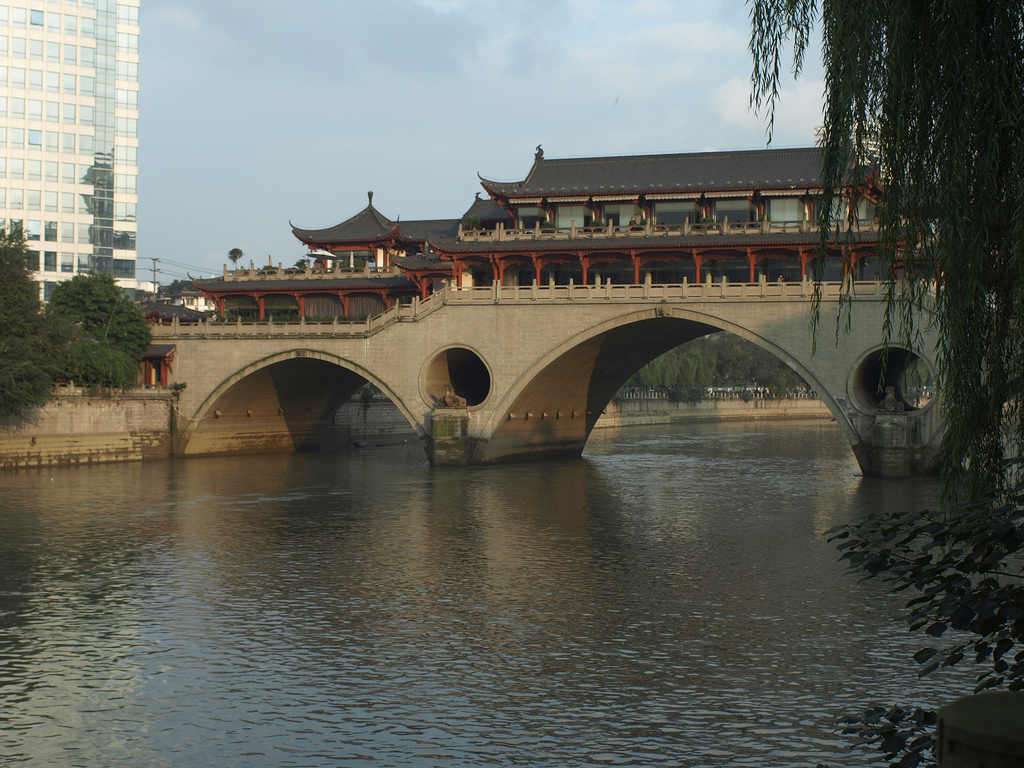
The river is crossed by the Anshun Bridge in Chengdu

The river has a history sediment accumulation due to both natural and anthropogenic factors which in the past led to congestion and flooding. At the end of the 1980s, due to increased populations and the development of Chengdu, the appearance of the Jin River changed with greater rates of sediment accumulation. The Jin River belongs to a plain river course with a small longitudinal gradient. With the decreased water inflow from upstream of the stream channel, the sediment deposits increased reducing the discharge passing the section.

As far as human factors are concerned, with the continual increase in city residents, some business owners and citizens built houses on the riverbanks and occupied the riparian zone. This greatly reduced vegetation on the stream banks and worsened sedimentation. People dumped garbage and waste in the rivers which further narrowed the river channel. The discharge rate of the Jin River has become lower than 1.2 m^{3}/s at this time. Moreover, when the rapid growth of a consumer-based economy was combined with lack of wastewater regulation and treatment, the Jin River became like a septic tank of Chengdu.

In 1993, Chengdu's renovation project of the Jin River began and was completed in 1997. In order to prevent wastewater from being dumped into the Jin River, the five-year project relocated about 640 family-based manufacturing stores from riparian zones of the Jin River to suburban areas that were further away. Twenty-six kilometres of sewer pipelines were built on both sides of the Jin River to divert the sewage water into a water treatment facility instead of directly polluting the river. This project also stabilized river banks and built dikes along the river channel in order to prevent flooding caused by sedimentation. Green spaces were created by planting trees and lawn near the Jin River, however, this ecological impact on the river was not studied. The river-cleaning project included the reconstruction of the Anshun Bridge. This historic bridge in Chengdu was destroyed in the 1980s during a period of flooding and was only rebuilt in 2003, after the 5-year river-cleaning project in 1997. The Municipal People's Government was awarded a prize for improving the environment of the river, from the United Nations.

== Recreation and tourism ==
=== Night-Tour Jin River ===
“Night-Tour Jin River” is located on the Jin River Green Road which is along the Jin River in Chengdu, from the Dongmen Pier to He Jiang Ting section. The whole tour takes "Jin River story scroll" as the main storyline, consisting of four parts: Urban Leisure, Dongmen Market, Downtown Meditation and Jin Guan Ancient Courier Station. There are six theme scenes: Night Market, Night Food, Night Exhibition, Night Show, Night Festival, and Night Stay. These themes illustrate the lifestyle of Old Chengdu, Shudu flavor, and international style. There are light shows too.

There are two routes for ‘Night-Tour Jin River’:

[Starting from Dongmen Pier]:

Path: Dongmen Bridge → Buddha Show → Pier story → December City →Architectural Light and Shadow Show → Sailing Show →Water Curtain Fountain →He Jiang Ting → Corridor Bridge

[Starting from Music Plaza]:

Path: Corridor Bridge → He Jiang Ting → Water Curtain Fountain → Sailing Show → Architectural Light and Shadow Show → December City → Pier Story → Buddha Show → Dongmen Bridge

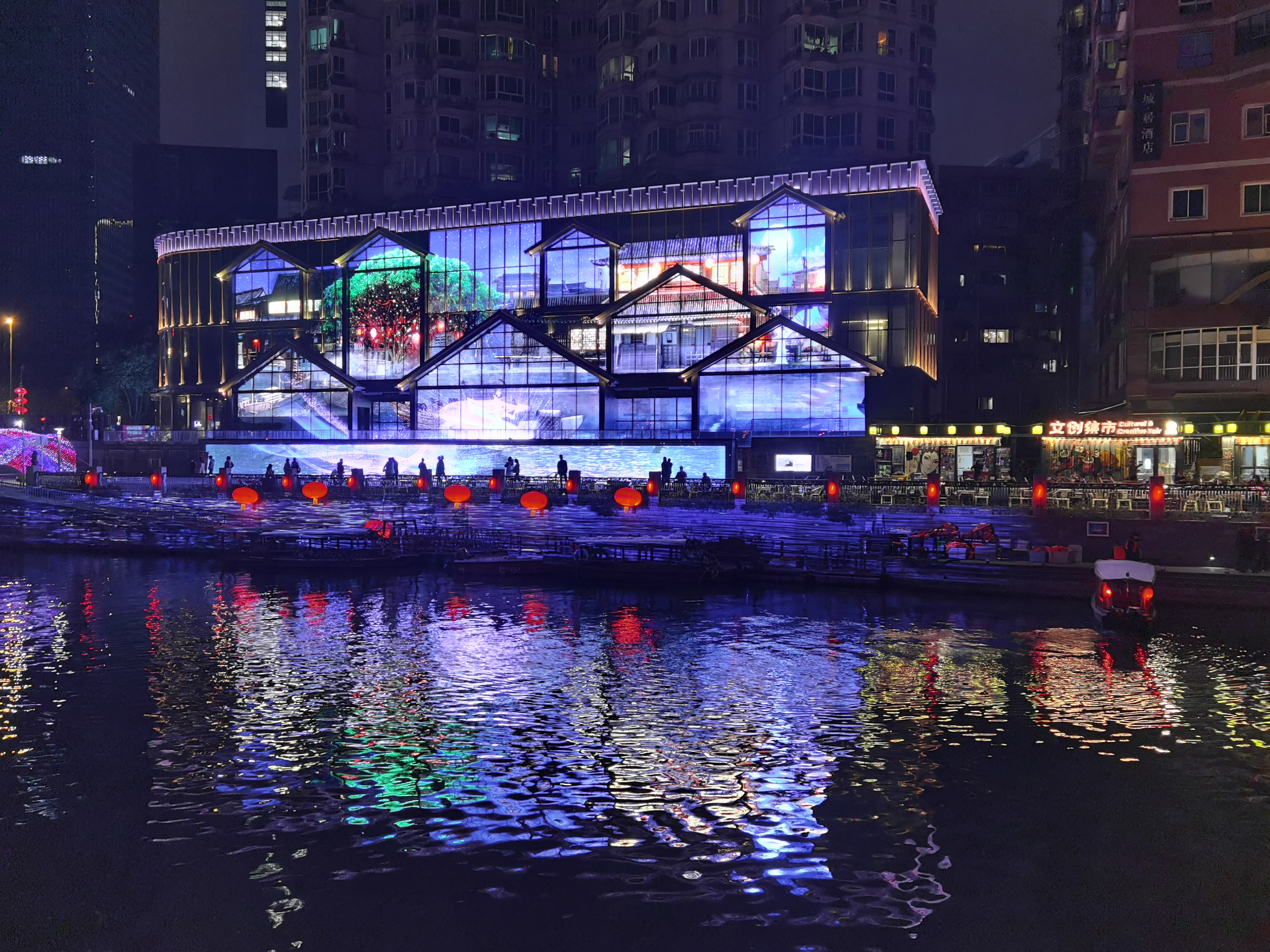
A night view along the river bank of the Jin River showing a scene from the popular Night-Tour tourism program.

=== Living Water Garden ===
Chengdu Living Water Garden is the first urban eco-environmental park with water as its theme in the world. It is located on the bank of the Jin River, which is across from the Huaxing Road Meng Zhou Wan, Jin Jiang District, Chengdu. The park integrates water environment, treatment, and education, and includes a constructed wetland biological water treatment system, simulated natural forest community, environmental education centre and other facilities. After a variety of treatment processes, the river water, which was polluted by the upstream sources and urban domestic sewage, flows back into the Fu River. Every day, the storage of Living Water Garden can reach 300 cubic meters, demonstrating the process of polluted water from "Turbid" to "Clear" and from "Dead" to "Alive" in nature.

Due to the combination of ecological, aesthetic, cultural and educational functions, Living Water Garden has won the "Excellent Waterfront Award" of the International Waterfront Centre in 1998, the "Environmental Design Award" jointly evaluated by the International Association for environmental design and regional magazine of the United States (juxtaposed with the Thames River Treatment Project in the United Kingdom), as well as several international awards including the 1998 UN Habitat Award Awards. At present, it has become one of the most visited parks in Chengdu.
