= Yin Xiuzhen =

Chinese artist

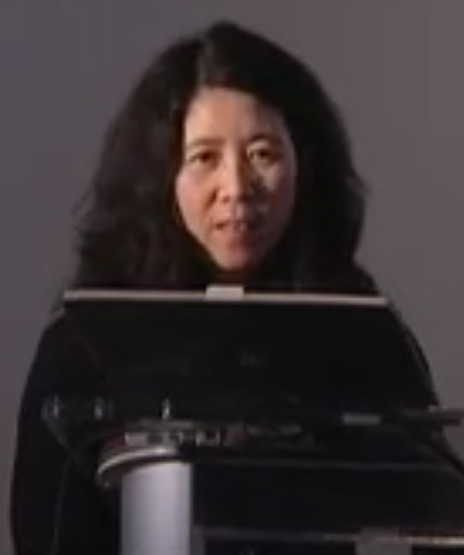
- At the Brooklyn Museum in 2007
- Born: 1963 (age 62–63); Beijing, China
- Notable work: Washing the River; Portable City
- Spouse: Song Dong

Chinese name
- Chinese: 尹秀珍
- Hanyu Pinyin: Yǐn Xiùzhēn

Yin Xiuzhen (Chinese: 尹秀珍; born 1963 in Beijing) is a Chinese sculptor and installation artist. She incorporates used textiles and keepsakes from her childhood in Beijing to show the connection between memory and cultural identity. She has also employed pots and pans, wooden chests, suitcases and cement in her work. She studied oil painting in the Fine Arts Department of Capital Normal University, then called Beijing Normal Academy, in Beijing from 1985 to 1989. After graduation, Yin taught at the high school attached to the Central Academy of Fine Arts in Beijing, until her exhibition schedule became too demanding. Her work has been described by Phyllis Teo as "possessing human warmth, intimacy, and a sense of nostalgia which propels introspection of one's self—traditions, emotions, and beliefs. Thus, creating of a sense of community and belonging within the audience (Teo 2016, 205)."

== Artistic practice ==
Yin's art has been greatly influenced by her impoverished upbringing during the time of the Cultural Revolution, a socio-political movement from 1966 to 1976. In an interview, she states, "the CR (Cultural Revolution) created more "hardships" and "bitterness" and regret" for the generations before us, it left me—young and naïve—with memories of "ideals," "magnificence," "collectivity"...(creating) contradictions and conflicts between isolation and openness, dictatorship and democracy became a new motivation, and as rapid changes cultivated in me an attitude of calm and quiet (Joo, Keehn, Ham-Roberts, 232)." As a child in the Cultural Revolution, Yin Xiuzhen found a creative outlet in the act of sewing, which has become a monumental component in her artistic practices.

Yin has stated the '85 Art New Wave Movement going on in China at the time along with a 1985 Robert Rauschenberg exhibition at the National Art Museum as turning her towards more contemporary styles and influencing her use of different mediums for her art. Xiuzhen's utilization of the various mediums such as fabric, found objects, and concrete added to the tactile interest and depth to her politically and socially charged works. It consolidated her position as a female master in experimental, avant-garde art which, at the time, was dominated by male artists like Gu Wenda, Xu Bing, and Ai Wei Wei. Yin spoke to Phaidon about how the Robert Rauschenberg exhibition inspired her, saying "I realized that the language of art should no longer be restricted to mediums and tools of painting and sculpture, which were what we had studied. Rather, it should be free and open, and should be used to express free and open messages." She incorporates used textiles and keepsakes from her childhood in Beijing to show the connection between memory and cultural identity. Yin Xiuzhen's Suitcase, 1995 was an installation created in a time that women in China were producing works that conveyed their frustrations and emotional distress in times of immense political pressure after the Tiananmen Square massacre. Yin's works in this period referred to the lives of women in village and traditional China. Her Suitcase installation preserves her pink, childhood clothing in concrete to literally preserve her memories as a youth. In premodern China, women upon marriage would pack their suitcases and were forced to abandon her family and village in order to fulfill her duties as an obedient wife.

== Works ==
She is well known for Portable City, a series of sculptures created from clothing collected in different cities shaped into building-like forms and arranged inside suitcases. Yin had made over 40 Portable City suitcases for various cities around the world to express her perceptions about the many places she's visited in this era of globalization. In an interview with Phaidon, Yin discusses her inspiration for the Portable City series and states, "I place emphasis on difference, but no matter how I emphasize it, it's always covered over by sameness". Suitcases and clothing are a popular medium for Yin, and she uses them in other works such as Fashion Terrorism (2004–05) to address global issues such as trust and security. In Fashion Terrorism, Yin used clothing to construct weapons and other objects forbidden on a plane, then packed them up in a suitcase.

In addition, Yin's work consistently demonstrates a concern for the relationship between the individual and the artist, with a particular interest in her home city of Beijing. Her works explored the issues brought by globalization and homogenization. She began working during a time when little attention was paid to environmental degradation in China, and her signature materials are used clothing, cement, and discarded building materials. For example, in one piece entitled Ruined City constructed at the Capital Normal University in 1996, Yin took 1,400 grey roof tiles, rubble, and objects directly from the site of a demolished building in Beijing and she used personal possessions such as a set of four wooden chairs from her marriage with Song Dong; transformed it into an installation piece that commemorated the essence of a city that was lost in the process of modernization.

Her work is also notable for its early engagement with environmental concerns. In 1995, as part of a public art event called "Keepers of the Waters" in Chengdu organized by American ecofeminist artist Betsy Damon, Yin created Washing the River, a performance piece involving ten cubic meters of frozen river water that she invited the public to wash until they melted away. These installations sought to raise awareness about the conflicting relationships between the social and natural in world in China during the time of global post modernization. All of these works reference the destruction of the environment brought by industrialization. Yin Xiuzhen's works convey tensions other Chinese people were facing in the aftermath of the Cultural Revolution. Yin has staged the river washing artwork in multiple locations around the world, including Australia and Germany, stating that the performance piece is relevant at each location it is performed at since environmental concerns are a global issue.

Yin has participated in group exhibitions such as Art and China after 1989: Theater of the World at the Guggenheim Museum (2017), and China 8, an exhibition of Chinese contemporary art in eight cities and nine museums in the Rhine-Ruhr region, Germany (2015), the 5th Moscow Biennale of Contemporary Art (2013), the 4th Yokohama Triennale (2011), the 7th Shanghai Biennale (2008), the 52nd Venice Biennale (2007), the 14th Biennale of Sydney (2004) and the 26th São Paulo Art Biennial (2004). Her work has been the subject of solo presentation at the Groninger Museum, the Netherlands (2012) and the Museum of Modern Art, New York (2010). In 2000 she was the recipient of the China Contemporary Art Award and the UNESCO/ASCHBERG Bursary for artists.

== Collaborations ==
Yin is married to fellow artist Song Dong and currently lives and works in Beijing. The two met at University in 1992, and collaborate on a multi-year project called Chopsticks, a format in which each artist prepares half of a sculptural project separately. They have also collaborated with choreographer Wen Hui and filmmaker Wu Wenguang on dance theatre. Their ubiquity, ordinariness, and practicality are critical to the overall meaning of the collaboration. The two have a daughter, Song ErRui, who has also collaborated with the artists. Their first collaboration as a family was in 2013, when they were commissioned to create Philadelphia Art Alliance centerpiece exhibition, which consisted of a three-story, multimedia installation that compared and contrasted American and Chinese family life. Song ErRui was 11 years old at the time of the exhibition.

== Exhibitions ==
=== Art and China after 1989: Theater of the World at the Guggenheim ===
Featuring works by Pace artists, such as Yin Xiuzhen, Song Dong, and Zhang Xiaogang, the exhibition explores works whose "critical provocations aim to forge reality free from ideology, to establish the individual apart from the collective, and to define contemporary Chinese experience in universal terms." From the end of the Cold War in 1989 to the Beijing Olympics in 2008, it surveys the culture of artistic experimentation during a time in the globalization and rise of a newly powerful China to a world stage. The emergence of Chinese artists during the 1990s and 2000s coincided when the Western art world began to look beyond its traditional centers, as global contemporary art started to take shape. Chinese artists played a crucial role on this revolution. Yin's Dress Box was featured in this exhibition posed next to Lin Tianmiao, suggest how the artists respond to the return of the domestic. Yin was inspired by her life living in Beijing's Second Cotton Factory and her mom's work in the garment factory. Yin's Dress Box was made by stacking together clothes from her childhood to present day in an old suitcase. She then filled it with cement and added a plaque of explanation to the interior of the case's cover. As her everyday items lose their materiality and function, her childhood memories become a form of mourning rather than genetic labor processes.

=== Back to the End (13 December 2017 – 3 March 2018) ===
In Pace Beijing's eighth installment of their annual project Beijing Voice, this exhibition highlights Yin's return to Beijing after four years, sifting through the spiritual threads behind her recent works. A girl curled up gripping her knees on a plane, Yin Xiuzhen has seized our era's disposition as vague, anxious, and riddled with crisis. Her new works are composed mainly of porcelain and metal material that was destroyed and reconstructed by her intuition and persistent power before there's nothing left but the debris, all referring to the unbearable reality. Yin had directed her approach to creating rather than being muted. Sewing up the scattered messages in the air to a mini world. Using a series of sculptural installations made from everyday materials to visualize subtle individual perceptions and the overlooked individual will, as she weaves a private biography into the narrative of history. This exhibition is an overview of her creations in recent years, as the entire exhibition space conceals a rational thread of understanding in a chaotic and unsettling atmosphere. Her largest work in perspective, titled Trojan, is a large scale installation part of her series, provides a spiritual sanctuary for the individual in turmoil. This installation uses black, white, and gray taking on an unsettling appearance, a passenger curled up sitting in an airplane seat. Yin appears not to attach any meaning to the work, although in contrast with her bright colors of her other works, the monochromatic tones of the work attempts to find consolation, becoming the representation of solitude, repression and anxiety in modern life.

== Bibliography ==
- Hou Hanru, Wu Hung, Stephanie Rosenthal, Yin Xiuzhen, Phaidon Press, London, 2014. ISBN 978-0714867489
- M. Chiu: 'Thread Concrete and Ice: Women's Installation Art in China', A. Asia Pacific, xx (1998), pp. 50–57
- Transience: Chinese Experimental Art at the End of the Twentieth Century (exh. cat. by Wu Hung; Chicago, U. Chicago, IL, Smart Mus. A., 1999)
- Lin Xiaoping: 'Beijing: Yin Xiuzhen's The Ruined City', Third Text, xlviii (Autumn, 1999), pp. 45–54
- 'Ai Weiwei: Yin Xiuzhen. Interview with Ai Weiwei', Chinese Artists, Texts and Interviews: Chinese Contemporary Art Awards (CCAA) 1998–2002, ed. Ai Weiwei (Hong Kong, 2002), pp. 130–37
- Chopsticks: Song Dong and Yin Xiuzhen (exh. cat. by Song Dong, Yin Xiuzhen, and C. W. Mao; New York, Chambers Fine Art, 2003)
