= Song Dong =

Chinese contemporary artist (born 1966)

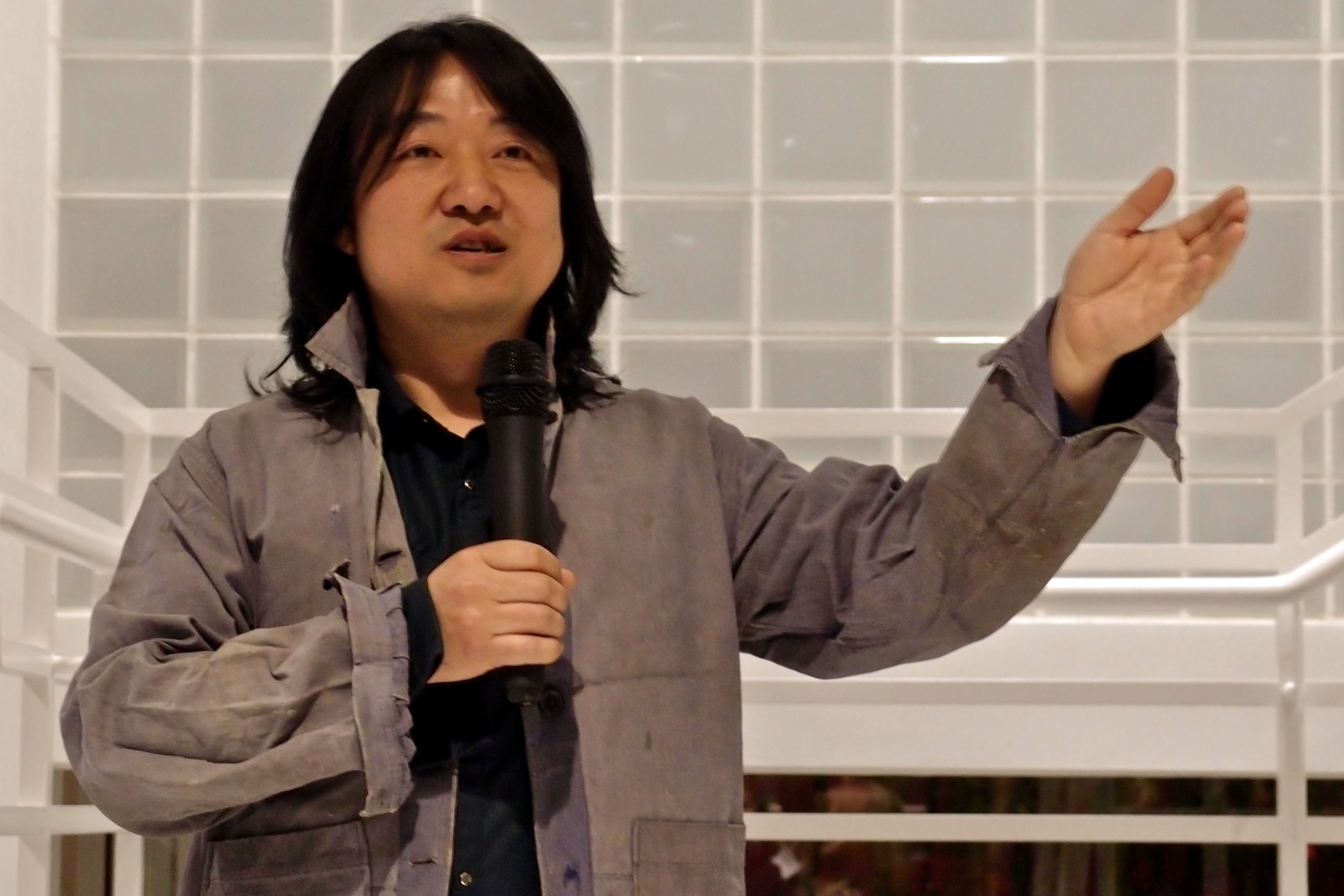
- Song Dong
- Born: 1966 (age 59–60); Beijing, China
- Education: Capital Normal University
- Notable work: Waste Not, Breathing, Touching My Father
- Spouse: Yin Xiuzhen
- Awards: Grand Award, Gwanju Biennale 2006

Song Dong (Chinese: 宋冬, born 1966) is a Chinese contemporary artist, active in sculpture, installations, performance, photography and video. He has been involved in many solo and group exhibitions around the world, covering a range of themes and topics including his relationship with his family and their experience of living in modern China (the topic of his widely exhibited installation Waste Not), the transformation of China's urban environment and the impermanence of change.

== Early life and career ==
Song Dong was born in Beijing in 1966 to a family that was once prosperous but was reduced to poverty by China's repeated upheavals. His father Song Shiping was caught up in the Cultural Revolution and was one of the millions of Chinese people sent to a re-education camp for supposedly being a "counter-revolutionary". The younger Song was raised by his mother, Zhao Xiangyuan.

Song was an enthusiastic artist from an early age and began painting with the encouragement of his mother – though his father was not so supportive – and first trained in oil painting. He graduated in 1989 from the Fine Arts Department of Capital Normal University in Beijing, and slowly began painting in a less conventional manner following his 1992 solo exhibition Show of Oil Paintings in Beijing's Culture Palace. In 1992, he married a fellow artist, Yin Xiuzhen. The two turned their back on their academic training and turned to avant garde and experimental art forms including performance and video.

== Artistic themes ==
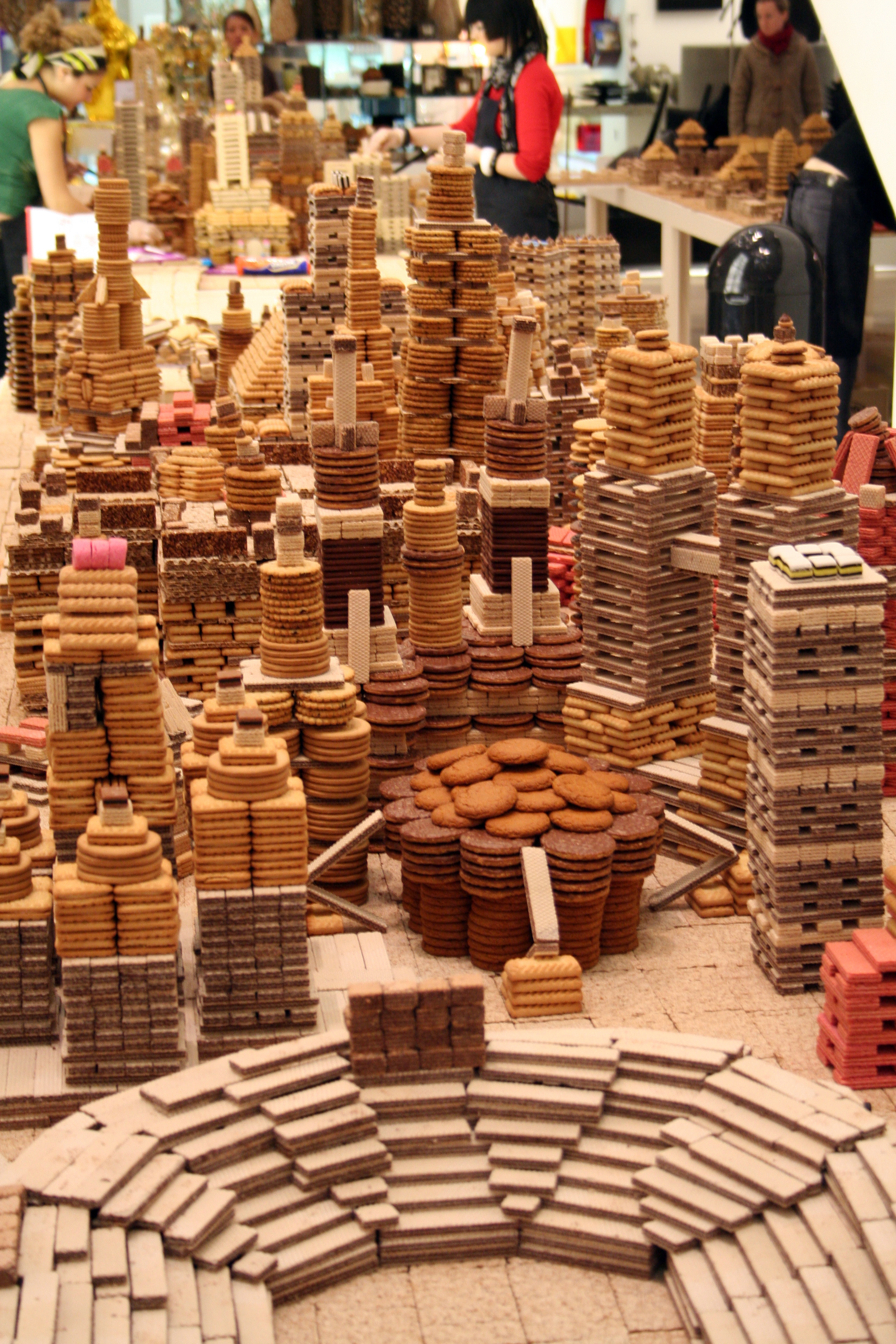
Song Dong's installation Eating the City, London, February 2006

Several of Song Dong's works have conveyed a theme of the impermanence of change, highlighting the way that although a single person could effect a minor change it could only have a fleeting impact. In 1995 he began writing a daily diary on a flat piece of stone using clear water rather than ink, so that the letters would disappear as he wrote them. He subsequently visited Tibet, where he photographed himself striking the Lhasa River with an old-style Chinese seal. The following year, he visited Tiananmen Square in Beijing on a freezing New Year's Eve to create the piece Breathing, showing himself lying face-down on the ground for 40 minutes until his breath had created a temporary sheet of ice on the pavement. He repeated the same thing on a frozen lake in a Beijing park that made no impression on the existing sheet of ice.

Both Song and Yin have made Beijing itself a major subject of their work. As the historic city has been progressively demolished to make way for modern buildings, the pair have retrieved fragments of the razed buildings to make artistic installations from them. Song highlighted China's dramatic transformation through a series of edible installations called Eating the City that were staged between 2003 and 2006 in Barcelona, Beijing, Hong Kong, London, Oxford and Shanghai. As he puts it,

the purpose ... is for the city I build to be destroyed ... As cities in Asia grow, old buildings are knocked down and new ones built, almost every day ... My city [is] tempting and delicious. When we are eating the city we are using our desire to taste it, but at the same time we are demolishing the city and turning it into a ruin.

Song's relationships with his parents have also been a recurring theme of his work. Touching My Father, created in 1997, tackled his distant relationship with his father (who died in 2002). It consists of a video in which Song's own hand, superimposed over a film of his father, appears to stroke him. More recently, he created the installation Waste Not displaying over 10,000 household items from the home of his late mother, whose extreme thriftiness led her to obsessively hoard anything that could possibly be re-used. As of 2012, it has so far been displayed in eight cities around the world.

Song was awarded a UNESCO/ASCHBERG Bursary Laureate in 2000 and won the Grand Award at the Gwanju Biennale in South Korea in 2006. He has put on many solo shows around the world, including Projects 90, at the Museum of Modern Art in 2009 and A Blot in the Landscape at Pace Beijing in 2010. His first major retrospective in Europe was presented in 2015 at Groninger Museum and Kunsthalle Düsseldorf. His group exhibitions include China Now, Alors Le Chine: Chinese Contemporary Art at the Centre Pompidou, Paris in 2003; Re-Imagining Asia HKW, at the Haus der Kulturen der Welt, Berlin in 2008, and at The New Art Gallery Walsall in 2009; and The 10th Liverpool Biennial, Liverpool in 2010. In 2012, Song contributed to the dOCUMENTA (13) exhibition at Kassel, Germany, with his Do nothing garden.

== Artwork ==
In Touching My Father, Song Dong projected an image of his hand onto his father's body with a projector. Starting from his father's face, the hand swept all across his father's body slowly and stopped at heart. Song Dong believes that there is a generation gap between him and his father. However, he always wants to express his love to his father. During that time, a Chinese father usually acts as an emperor of the family. The relationship between father and son was normally like a ruler and subject. His father declined him whenever Song Dong request to touch his father. In the end, Song Dong tells his father: "I will be famous if you let me finish this artwork." These words influenced his father's opinion and allowed him to finish the artwork. At that moment, Song Dong realized that his father sacrificed his dignity and authority as a father for his son's success and future. More information https://www.youtube.com/watch?v=l0J_ot7SkKU

Another artwork Song Dong created is called doing nothing garden, this installation is a 6 meters tall mound piled with organic trash, and is fully covered by grass and flowers. It had been exhibited in Kassel Germany for Documenta 13 exhibition in 2010-2012. This artwork discusses about doing things: doing nothing rather than doing something, doing nothing leads to creating something. His work has a sense of helplessness to change the nature and society that human has limited power to change the nature. After the exhibition, Song Dong removes everything and no more garden remains, just like human doing so much work to protect nature, but nothing changes.
