= Financial City station =

Metro station in Chengdu, China

Financial City 金融城
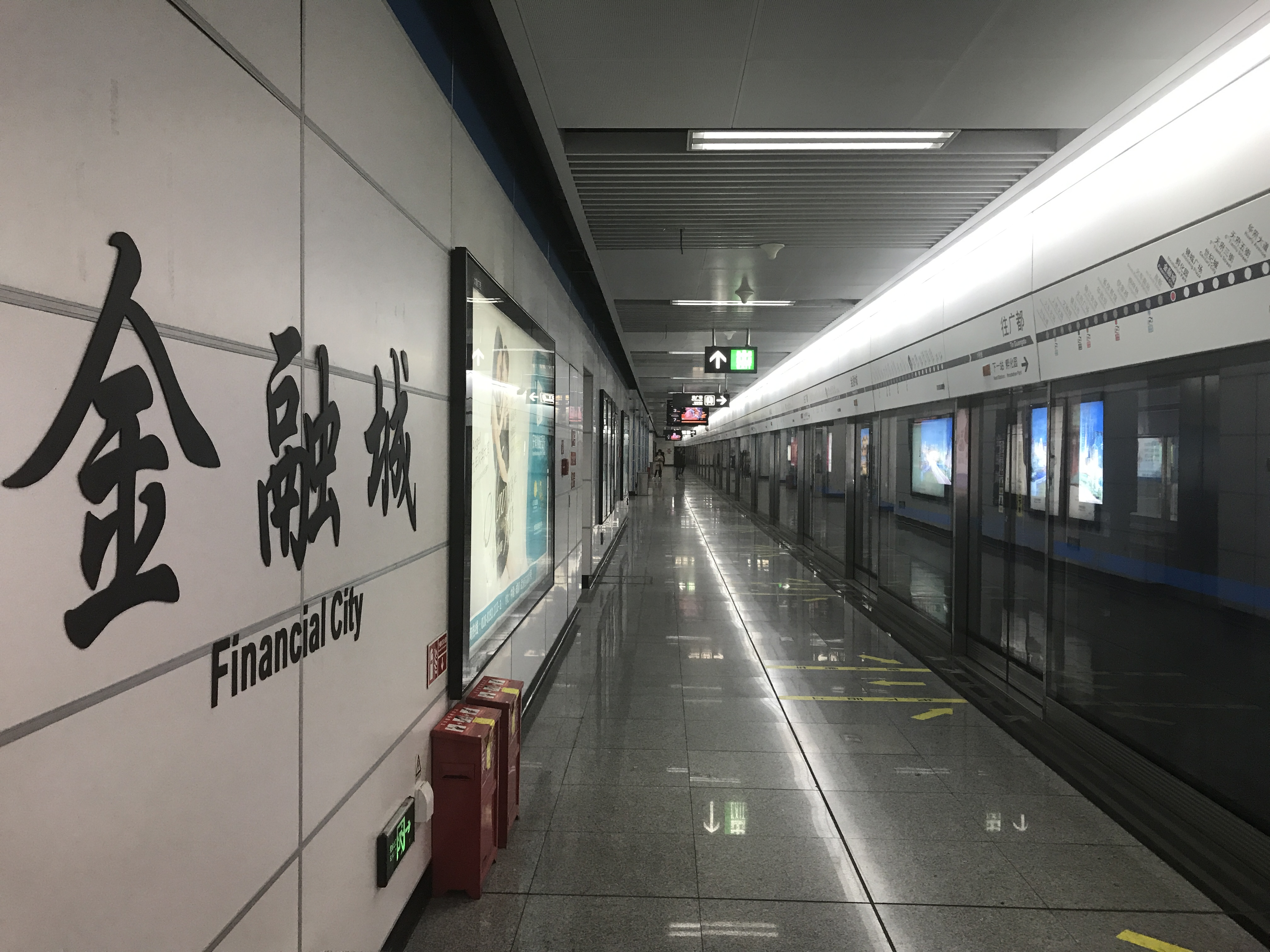

General information
- Location: Wuhou District, Chengdu, Sichuan; China
- Coordinates: 30.5873°N 104.0609°E
- Operator: Chengdu Metro Limited
- Line: Line 1
- Platforms: 2 (2 side platforms)

Other information
- Station code: 0115

History
- Opened: 27 September 2010

Services
Preceding station	Chengdu Metro	Following station
Hi-Tech Zone towards Weijianian	Line 1	Incubation Park towards Science City or Wugensong
Location

Financial City (Chinese: 金融城) is a metro station on Line 1 of the Chengdu Metro in China.

== Station layout ==
G	Entrances and Exits	Exits A-D
B1	Concourse	Faregates, Station Agent
B1	Side platform, doors open on the right
B1	Northbound	← Line 1 towards Weijianian (Hi-Tech Zone)
B1	Southbound	Line 1 towards Science City (Incubation Park) →
B1	Side platform, doors open on the right
B1	Concourse	Faregates, Station Agent
B2	Underpass

== Gallery ==
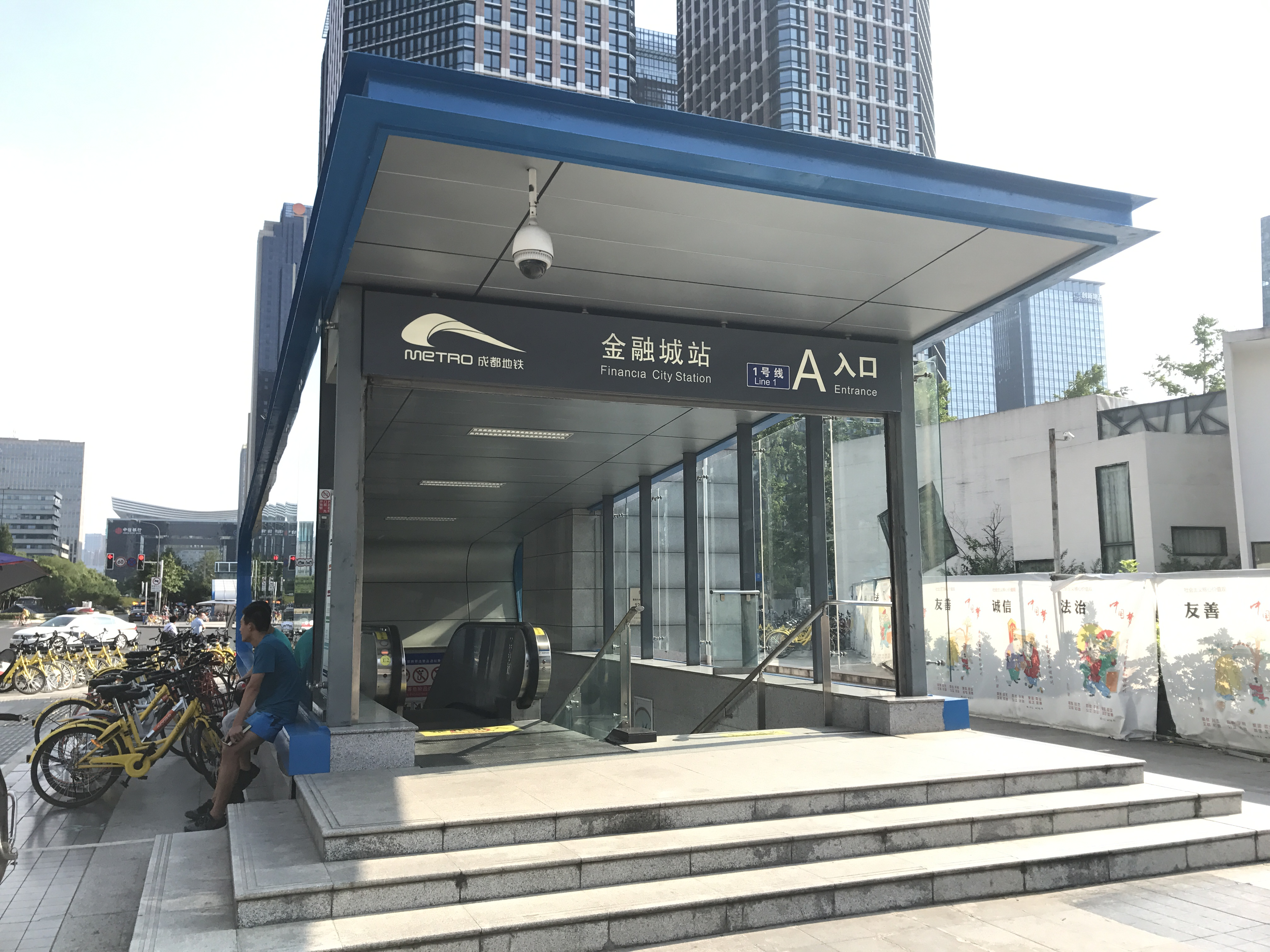
Entrance A

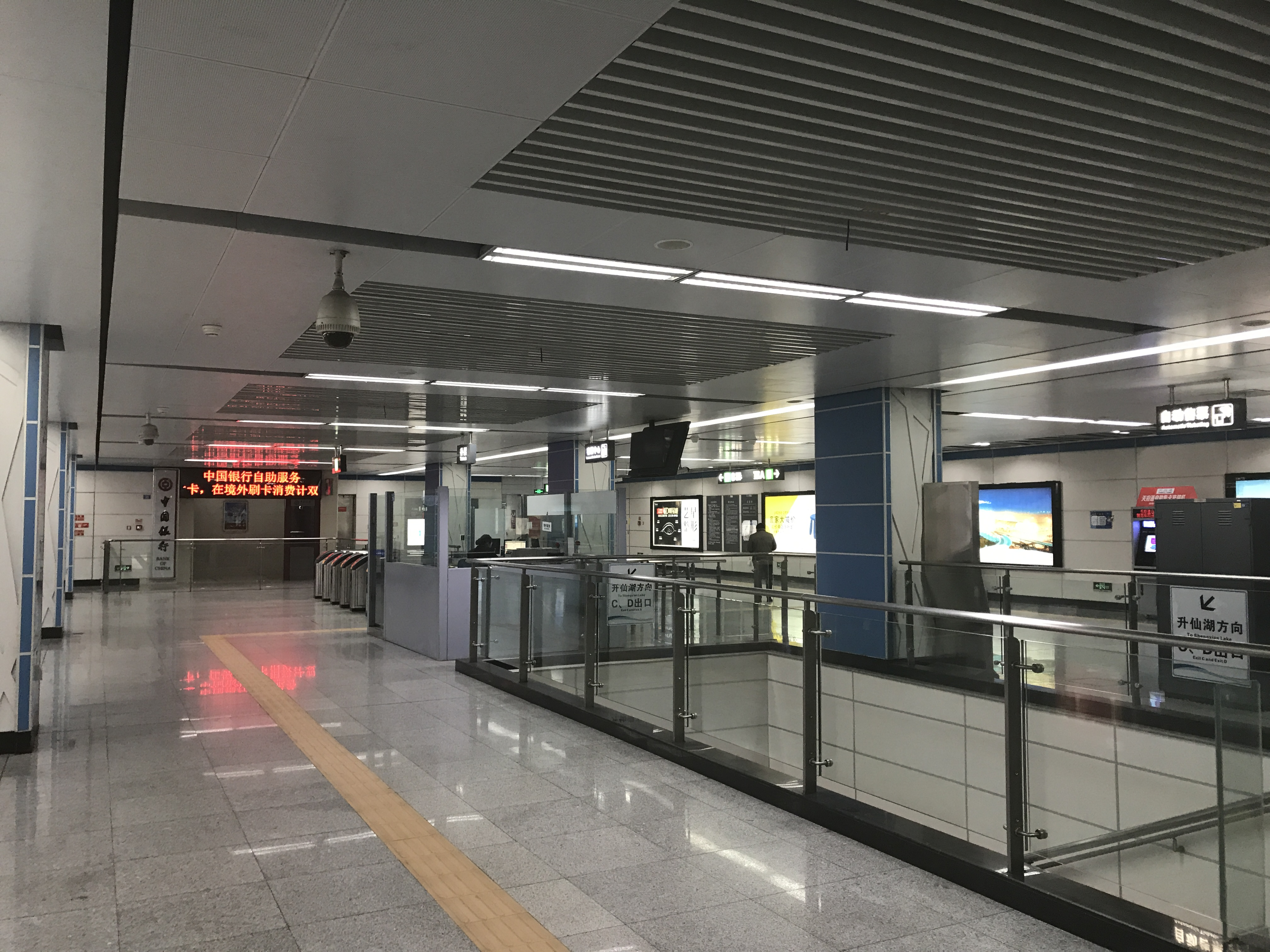
Concourse

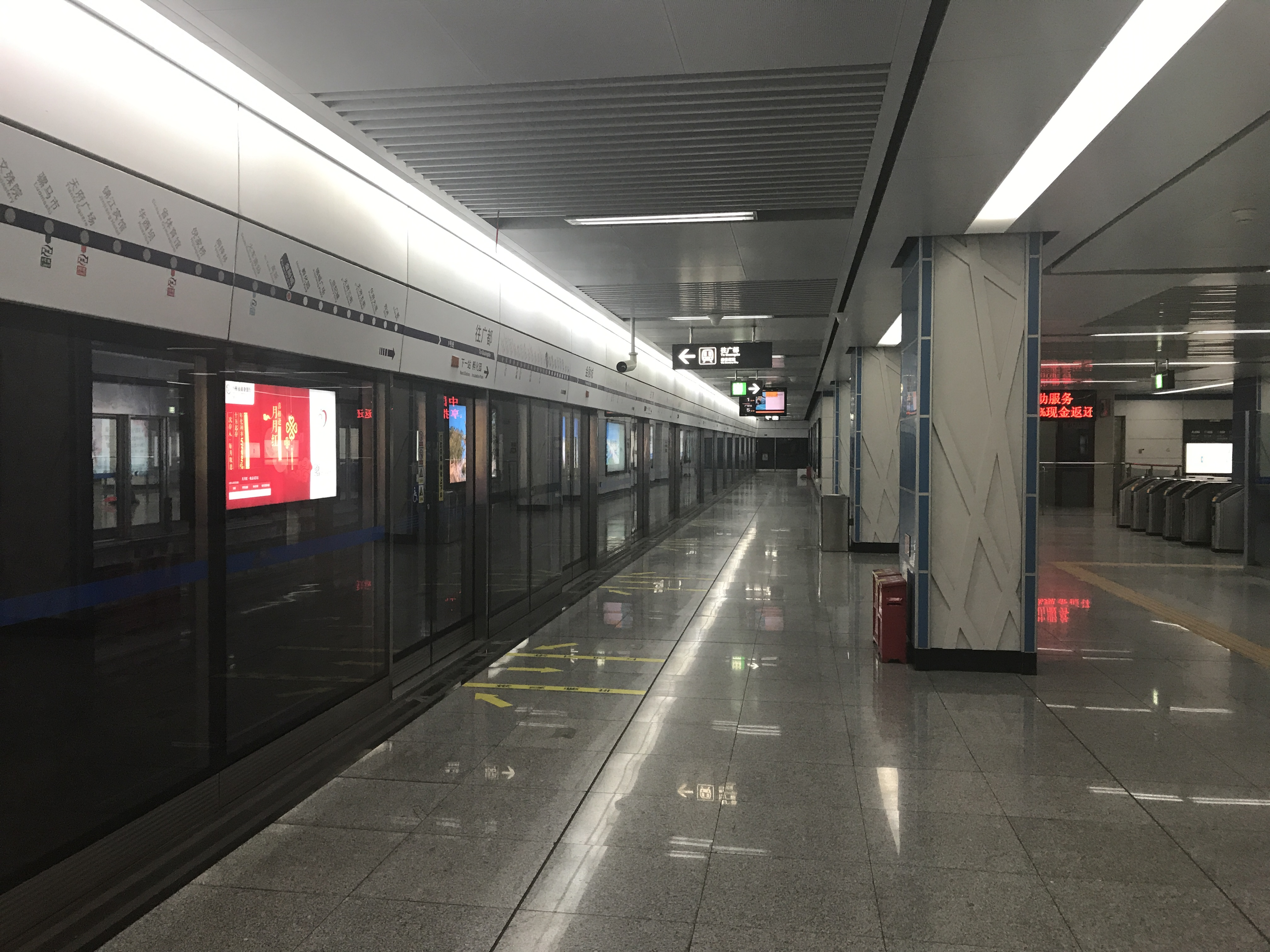
Platform
